= National Romantic style =

Nordic architectural style

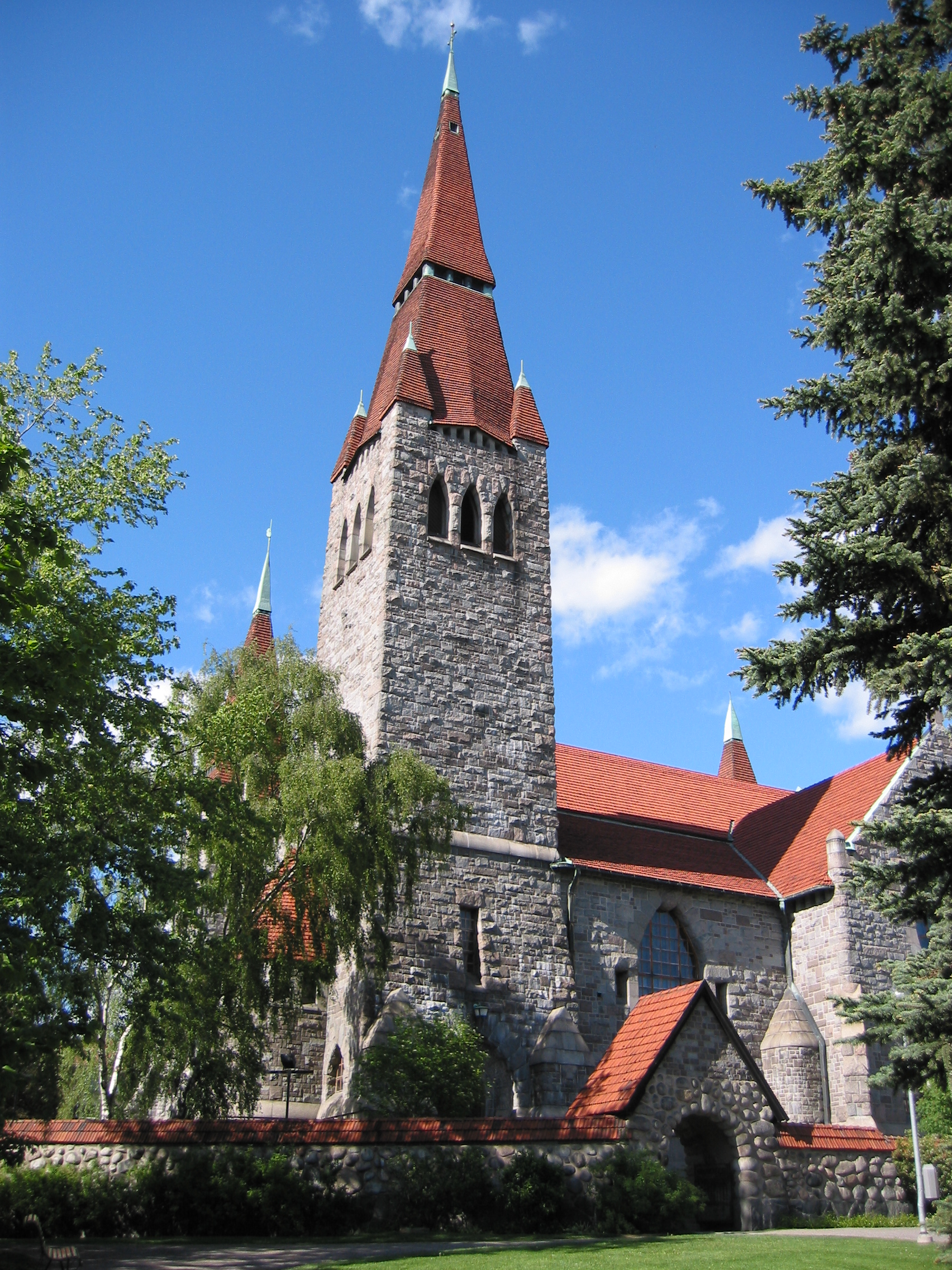
Tampere Cathedral, an example of National Romantic architecture in Finland.

The National Romantic style was a Nordic architectural style that was part of the National Romantic movement during the late 19th and early 20th centuries. It is often considered to be a form of Art Nouveau.

The National Romantic style spread across Denmark, Norway, Sweden, Finland, Estonia, and Latvia, as well as Russia, where it also appeared as Russian Revival architecture. Unlike some nostalgic Gothic Revival style architecture in some countries, Romantic architecture often expressed progressive social and political ideals, through reformed domestic architecture.

Nordic designers turned to early medieval architecture and even prehistoric precedents to construct a style appropriate to the perceived character of people. The style can be seen as a reaction to industrialism and an expression of the same "Dream of the North" Romantic nationalism that gave impetus to renewed interest in the study of the history of Scandinavia, along with the rediscovery of the eddas and sagas of Nordic mythology.

== Examples ==
- Bergen Station (Bergen stasjon) (1913, Norway)
- Copenhagen City Hall (Københavns Rådhus) (1905, Denmark)
- Dresden Saxon District Court (Königlich-Sächsisches Landgericht) (1902, Germany)
- Finnish National Theatre (Suomen Kansallisteatteri) (1902, Finland)
- Frogner Church (Frogner kirke) (1907, Norway)
- Helsinki Central Station (Helsingin päärautatieasema) (1919, Finland)
- Holdre Manor (Holdre mõis) (1910, Estonia)
- National Museum of Finland (Suomen Kansallismuseo) (1905, Finland)
- Norwegian Institute of Technology (Norges tekniske høgskole) (1910, Norway)
- Pohjola Insurance building (1901, Finland)
- Polytechnic Students' Union or Sampo Building (1903, Finland)
- Röhss Museum (Röhsska konstslöjdsmuseet) (1916, Sweden)
- Stockholm City Hall (Stockholms stadshus) (1923, Sweden)
- Stockholm Court House (Stockholms Rådhus) (1915, Sweden)
- Taagepera Castle (Taagepera mõis) (1912, Estonia)
- Tarvaspää, (1913, Finland) the house and studio built for himself by Finnish painter Akseli Gallen-Kallela
- Tolstoy House (Толстовский дом) (1912, Russia)
- Uppenbarelsekyrkan/Church of the Epiphany (Uppenbarelsekyrkan) (1913, Sweden)
- Vålerenga Church (Vålerenga kirke) (1902, Norway)

=== Sweden ===
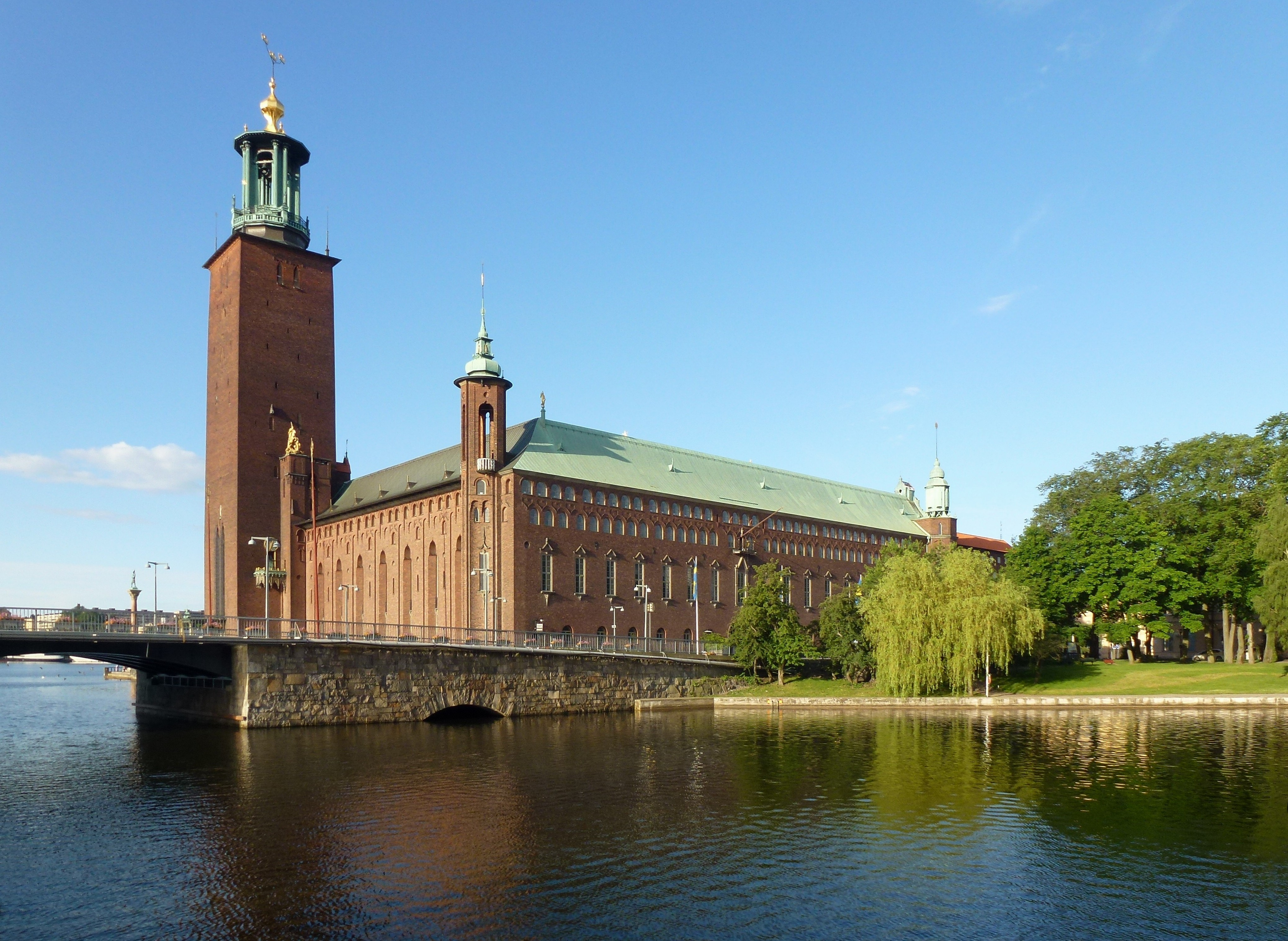
Stockholm City Hall

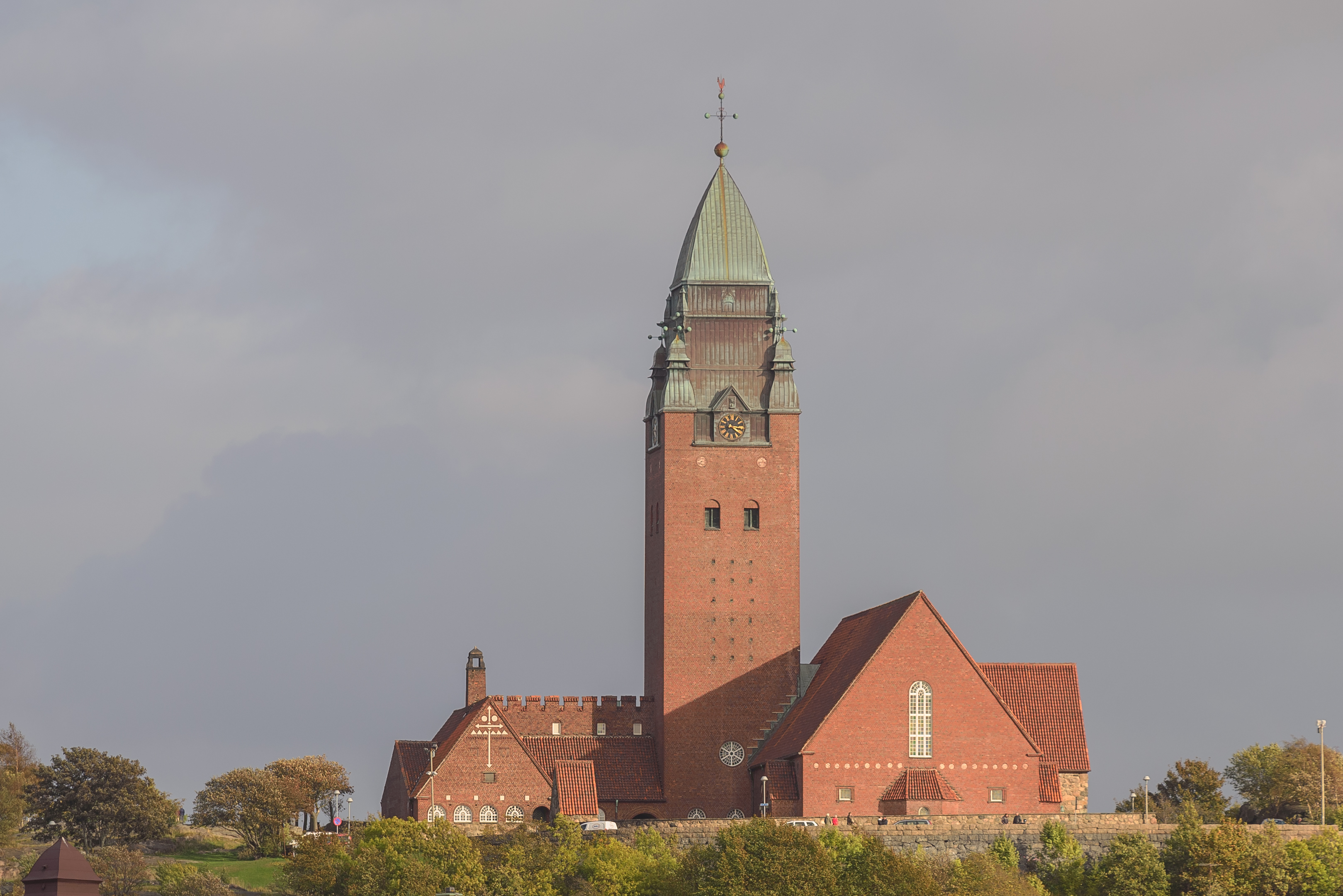
Masthugg Church

=== Finland ===
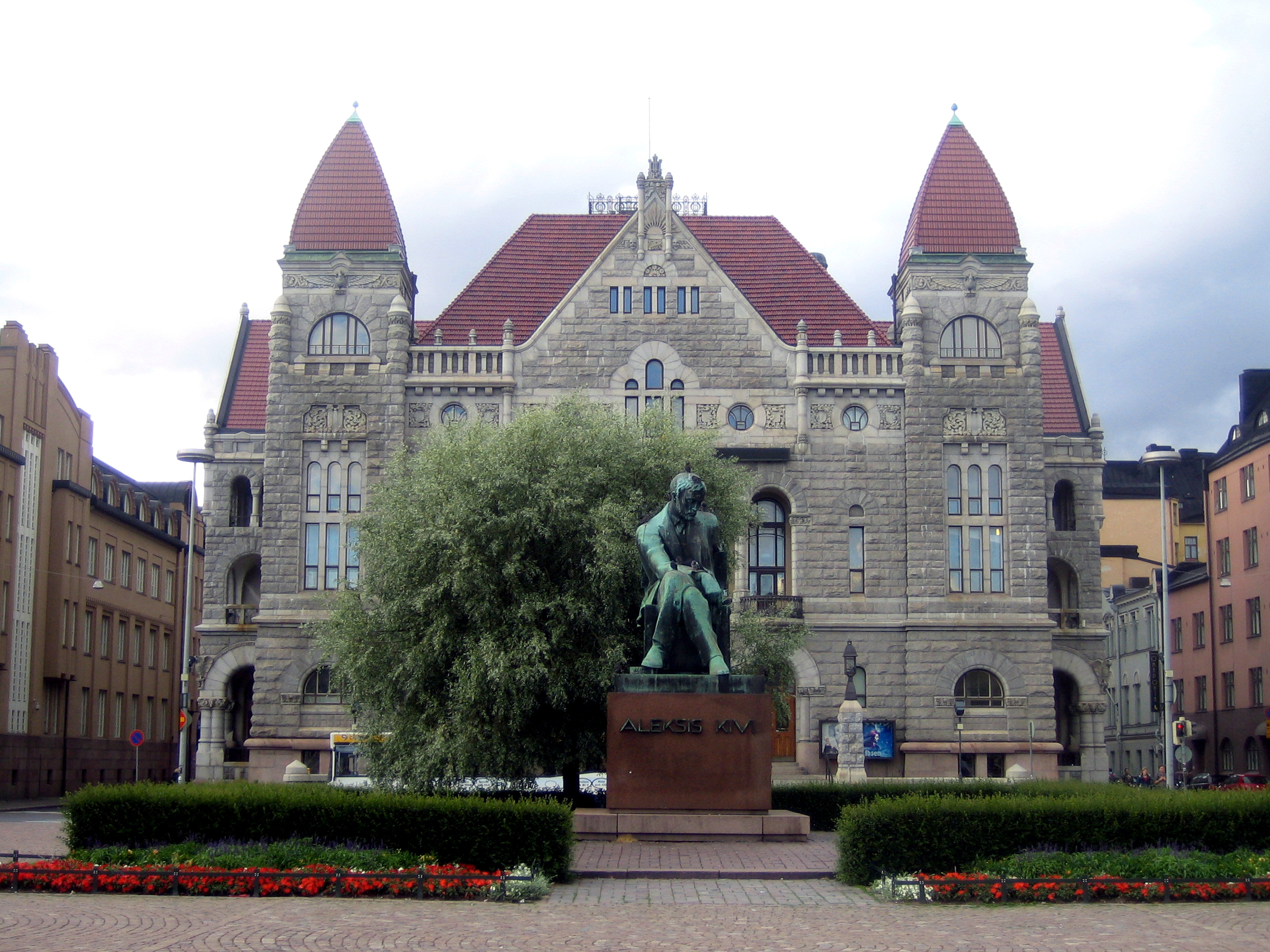
The Finnish National Theatre

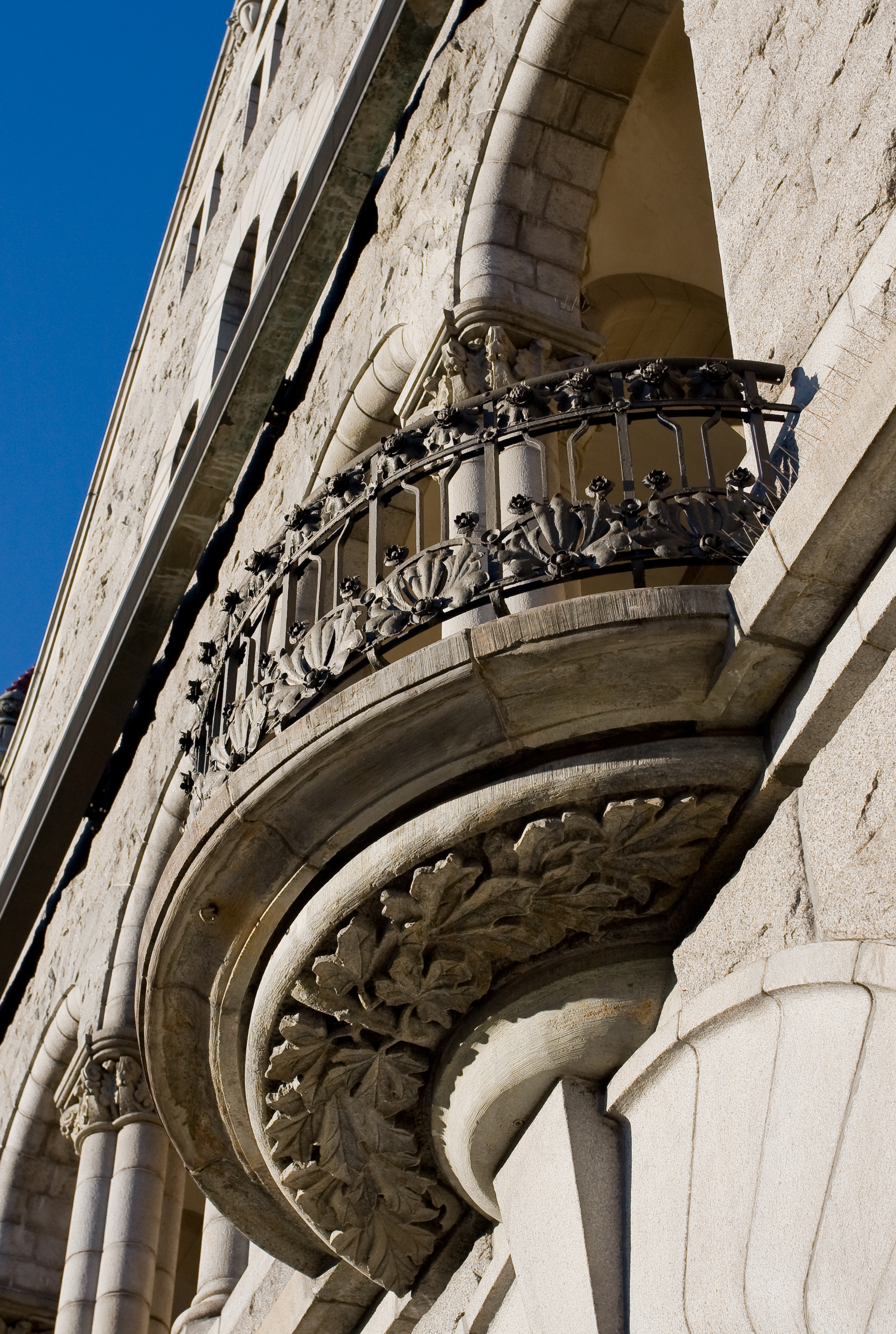
Detail of Finnish National Theatre facade

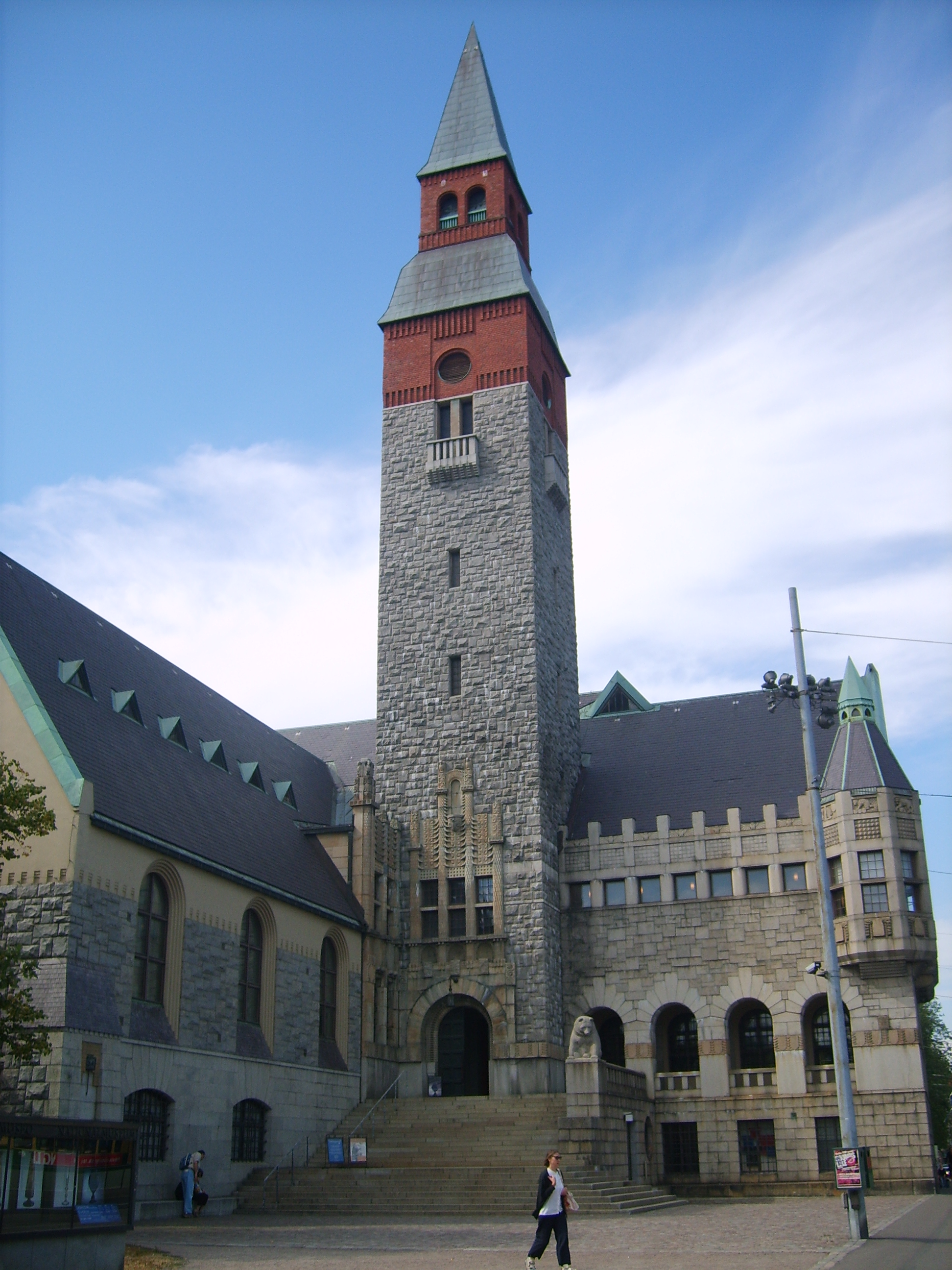
The National Museum of Finland

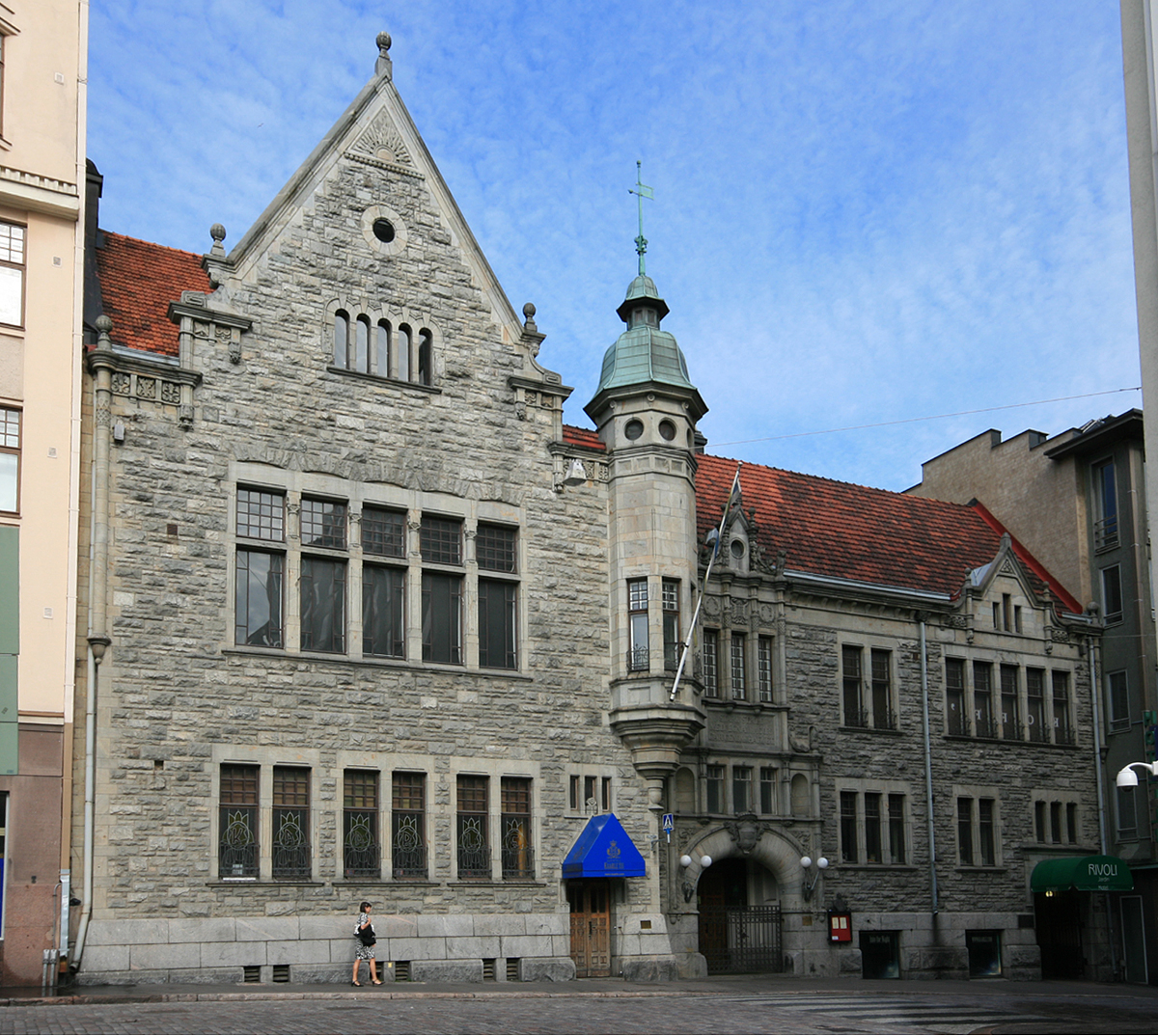
Nylands Nation, Student Nation of Helsinki University

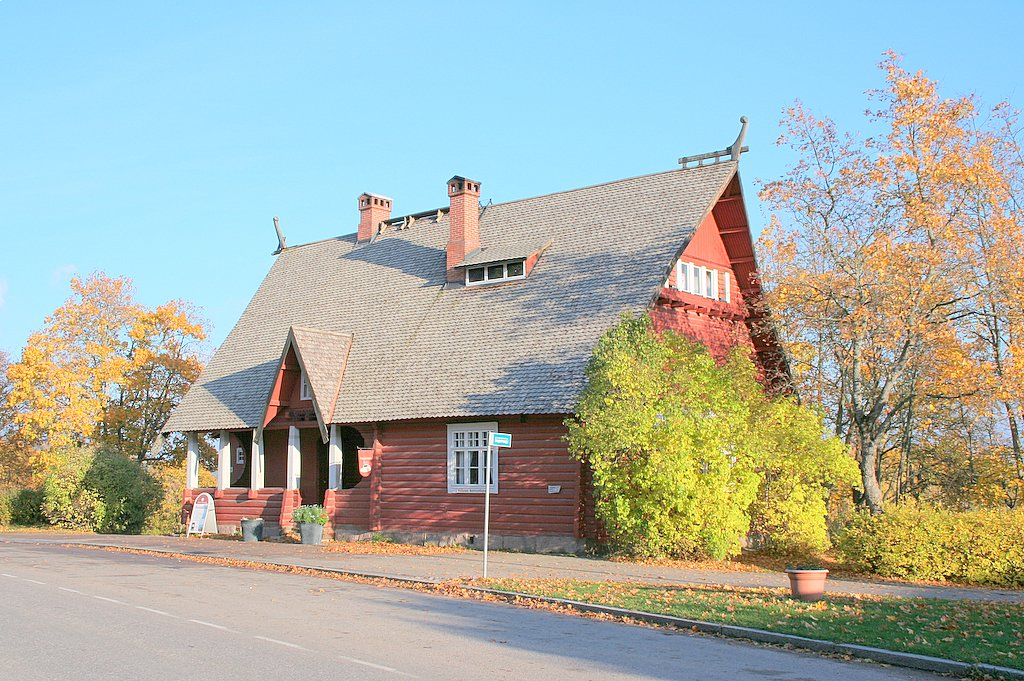
Hollola Municipal House

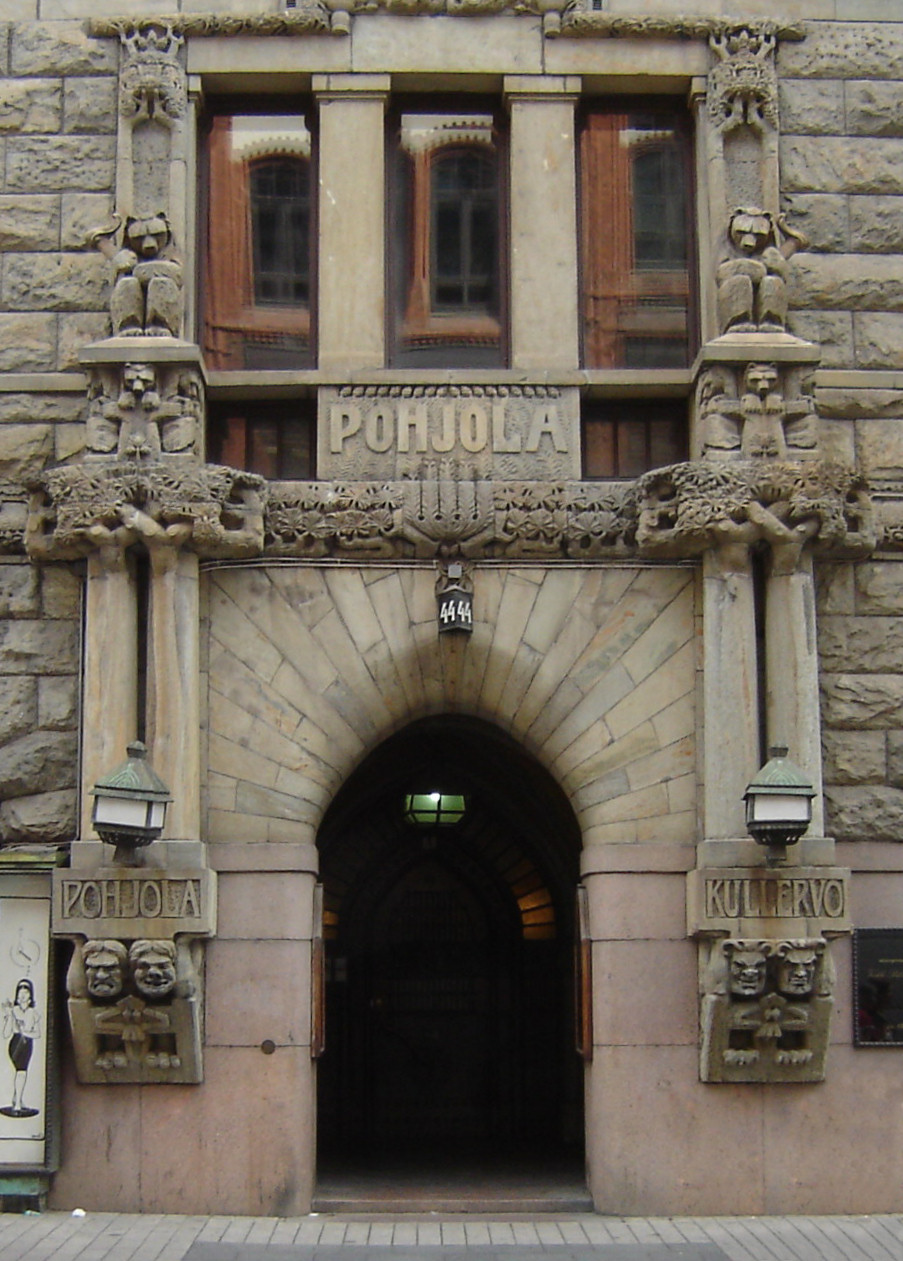
Alexanterinkatu Facade of Pohjola Insurance building, 1901.

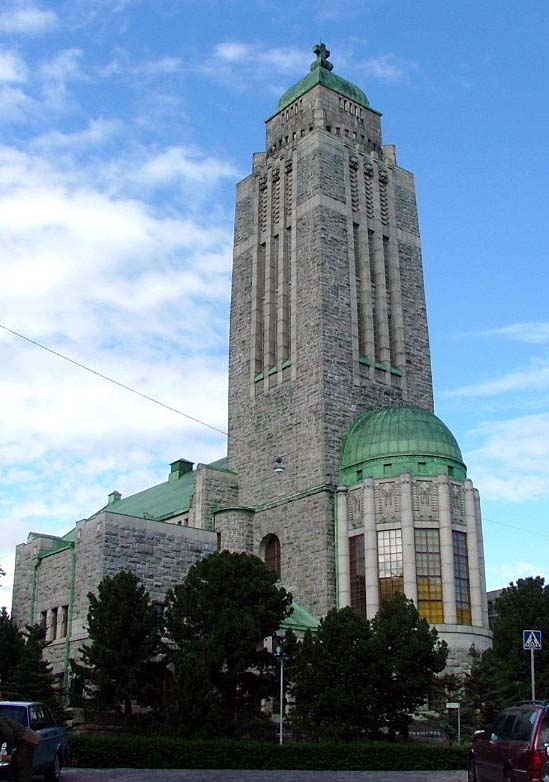
Kallio Church, Helsinki

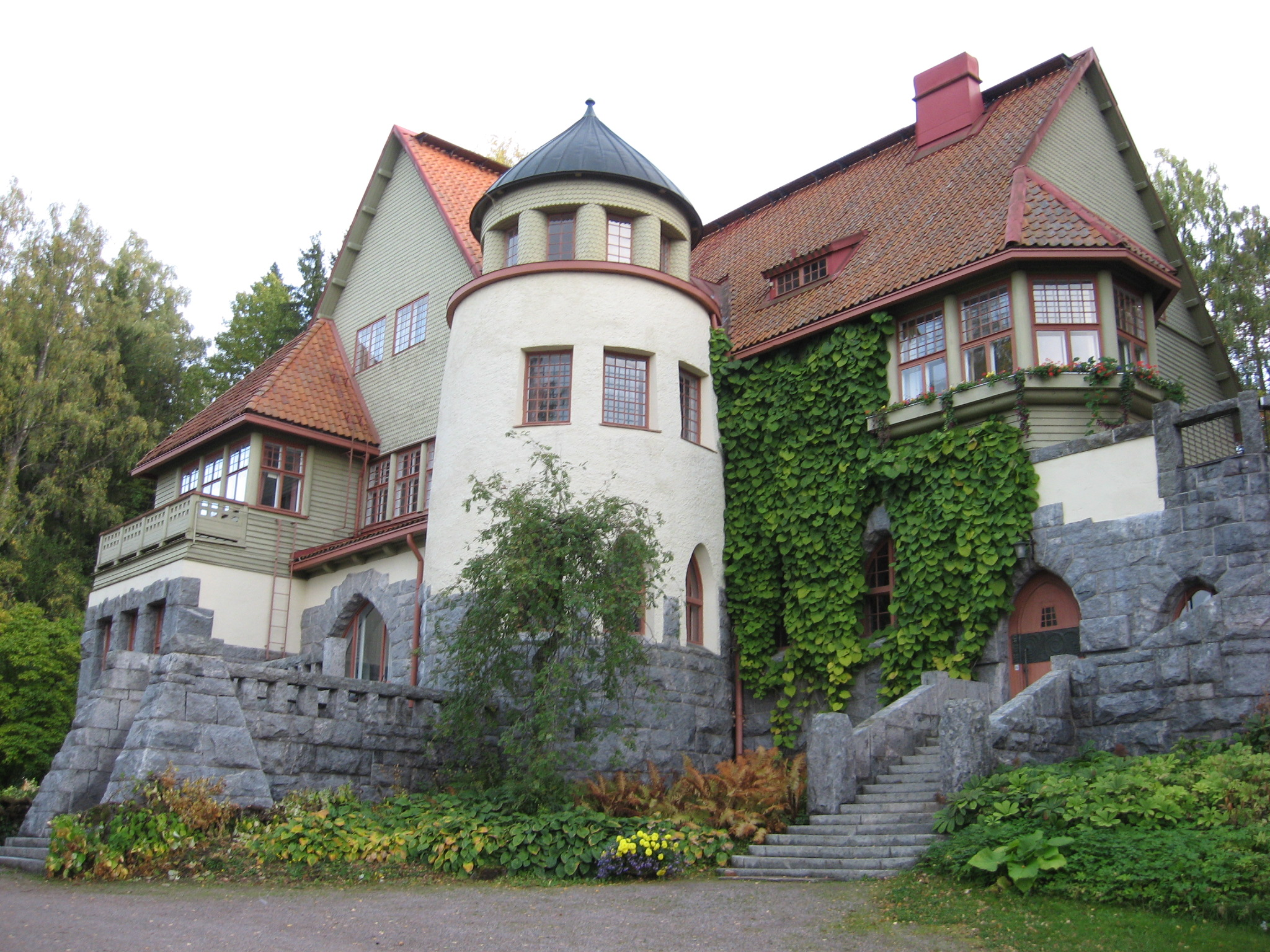
Hvittorp (near Kirkkonummi). Built by Saarinen, Gesellius, and Lindgren for Robert Westerlund

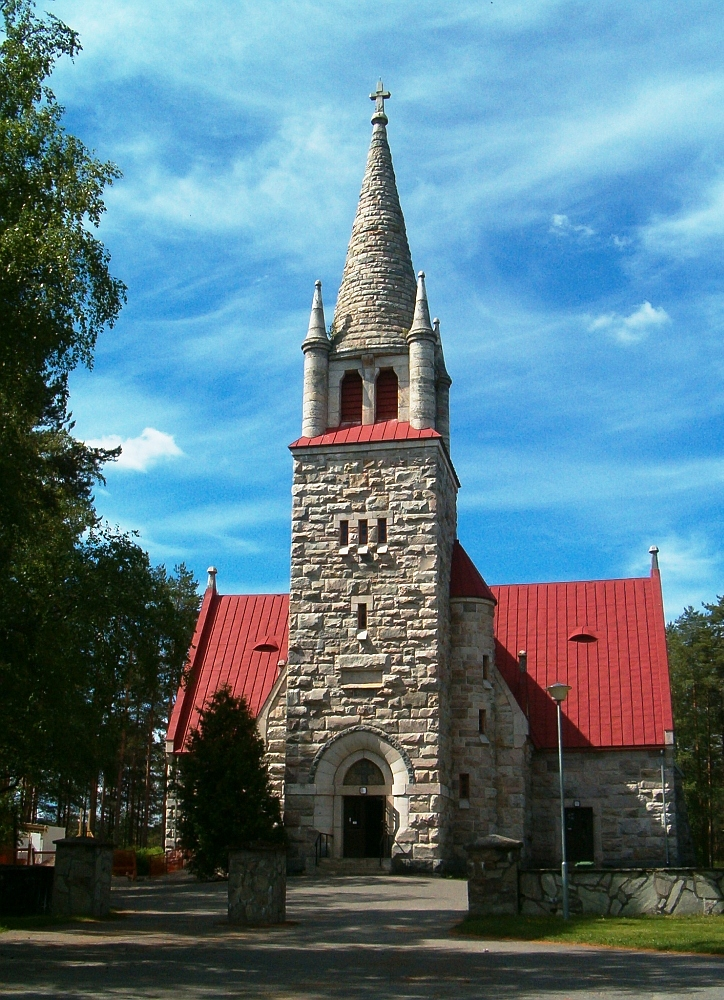
Nilsiä Church, North Savo

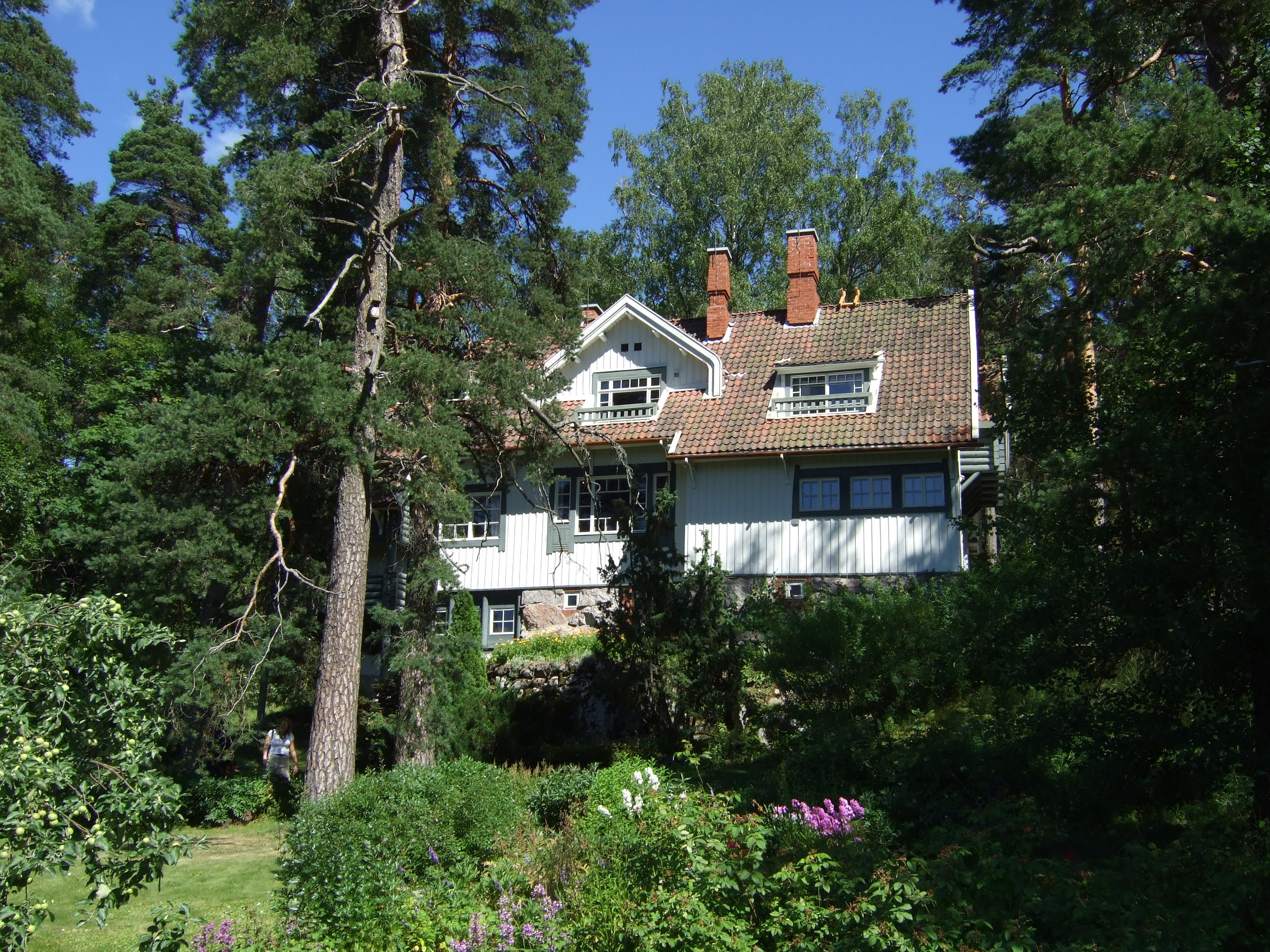
Ainola, Sibelius' home.

=== Estonia ===
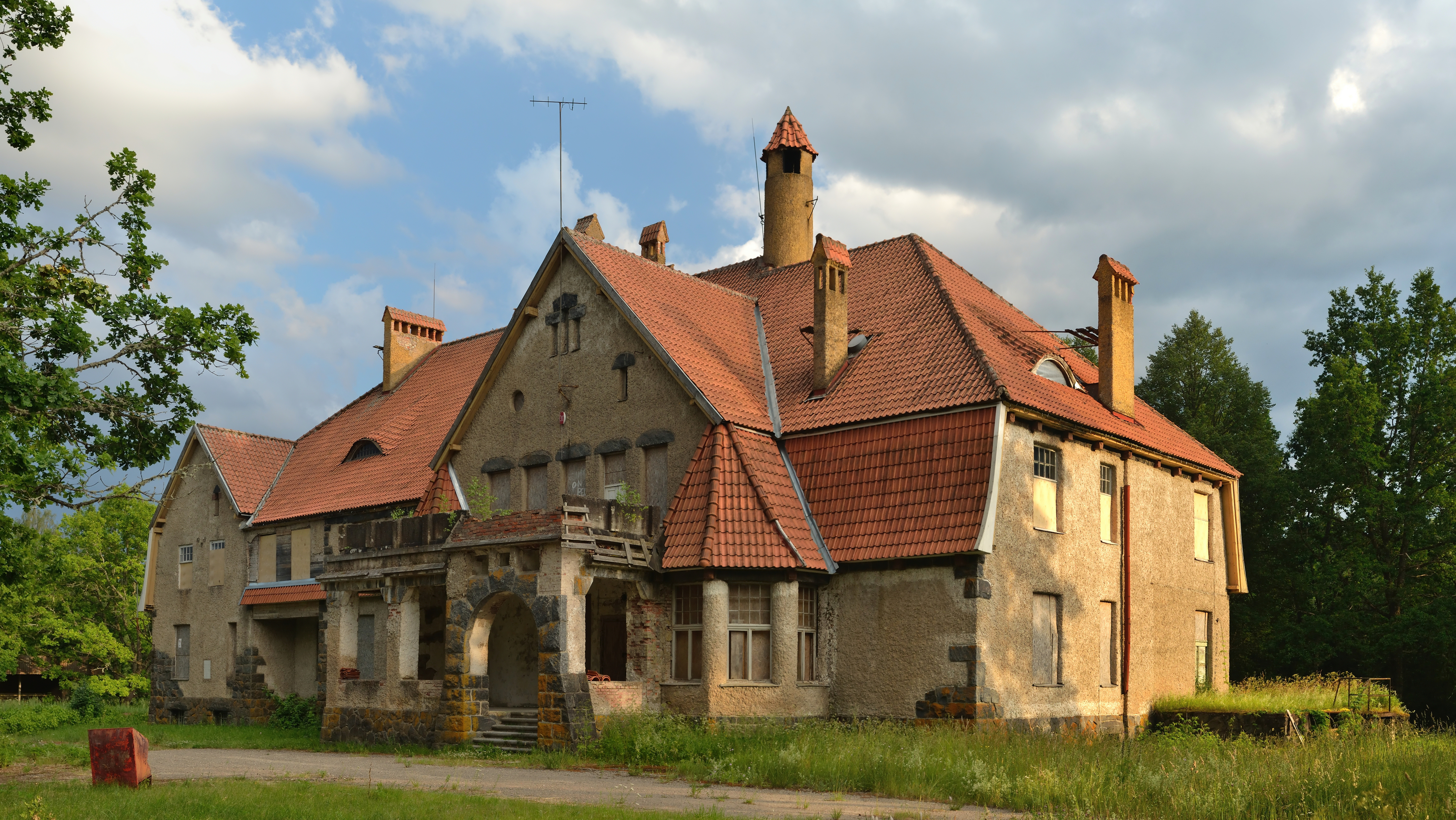
Holdre Manor

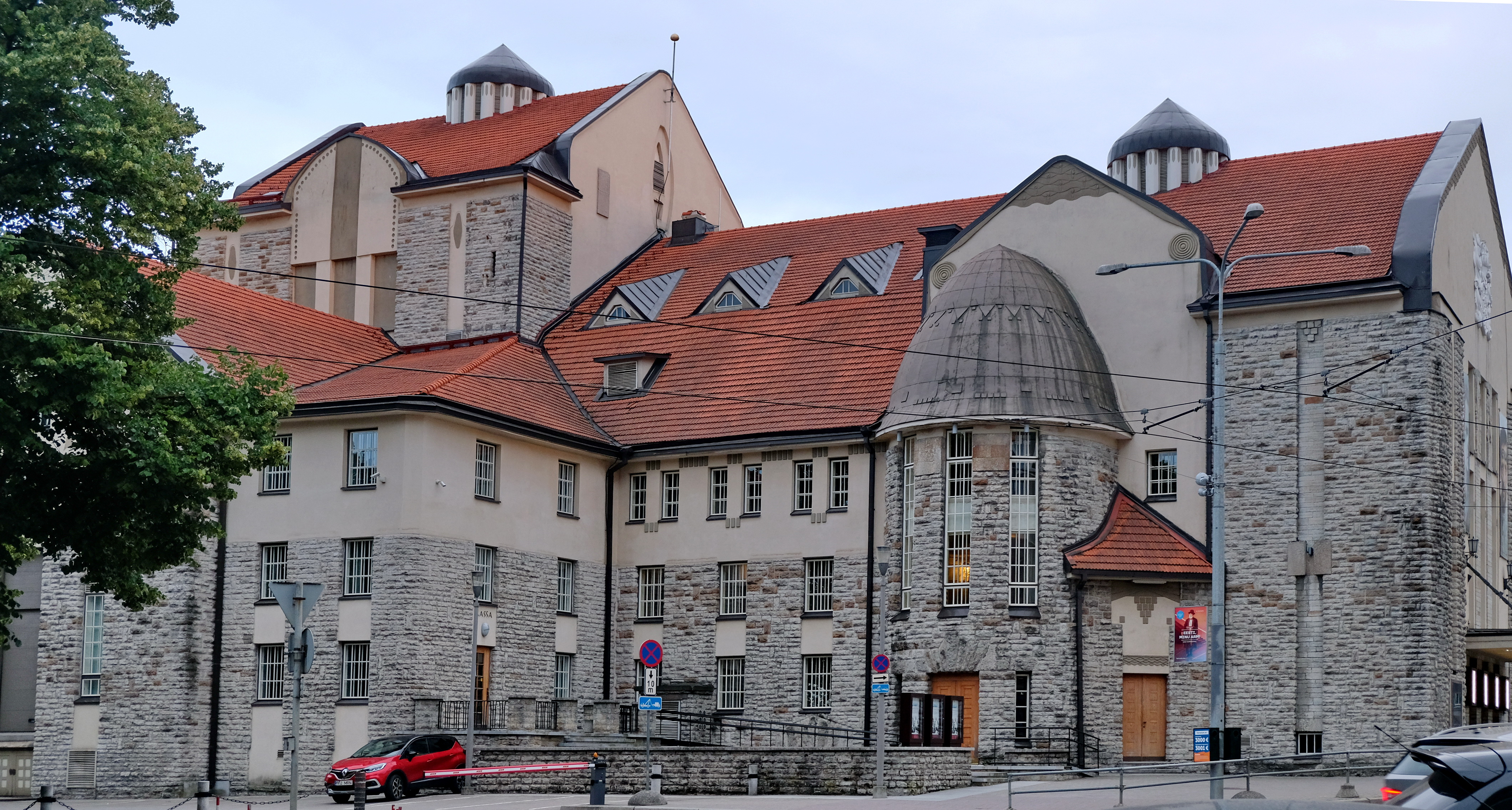
Reval German Theatre

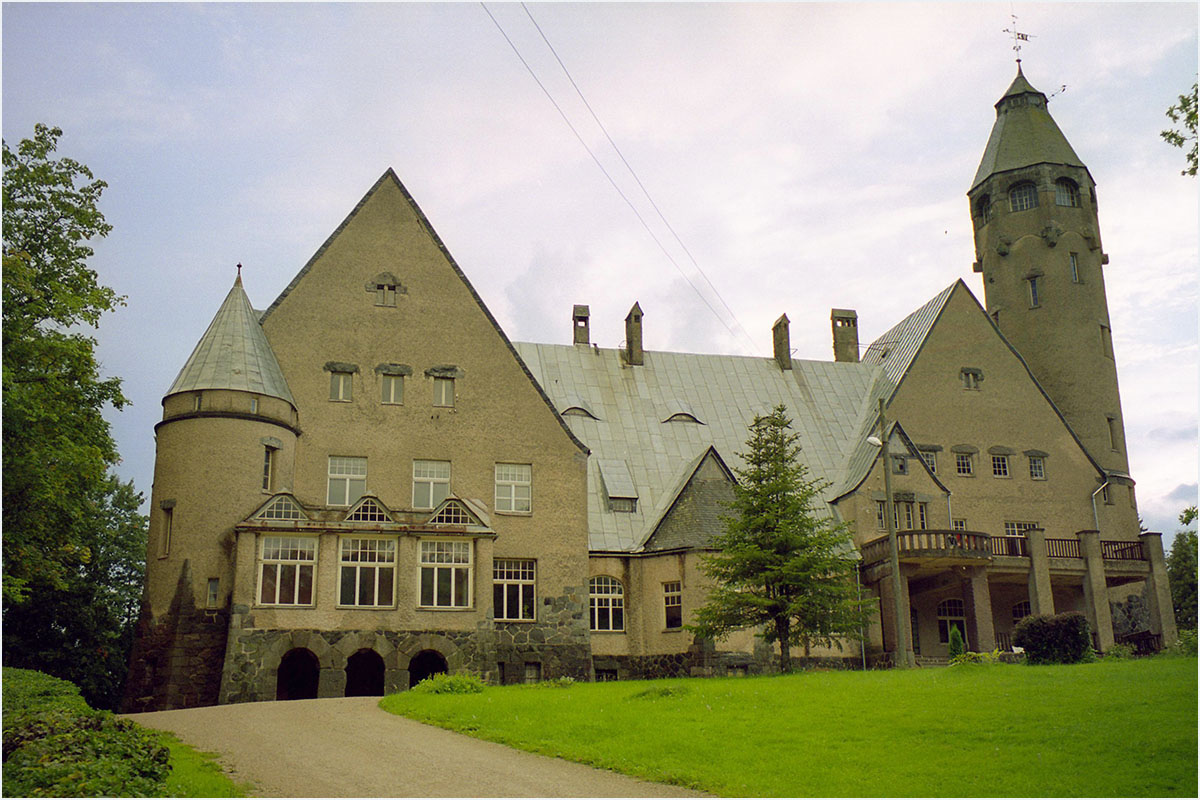
Taagepera Castle

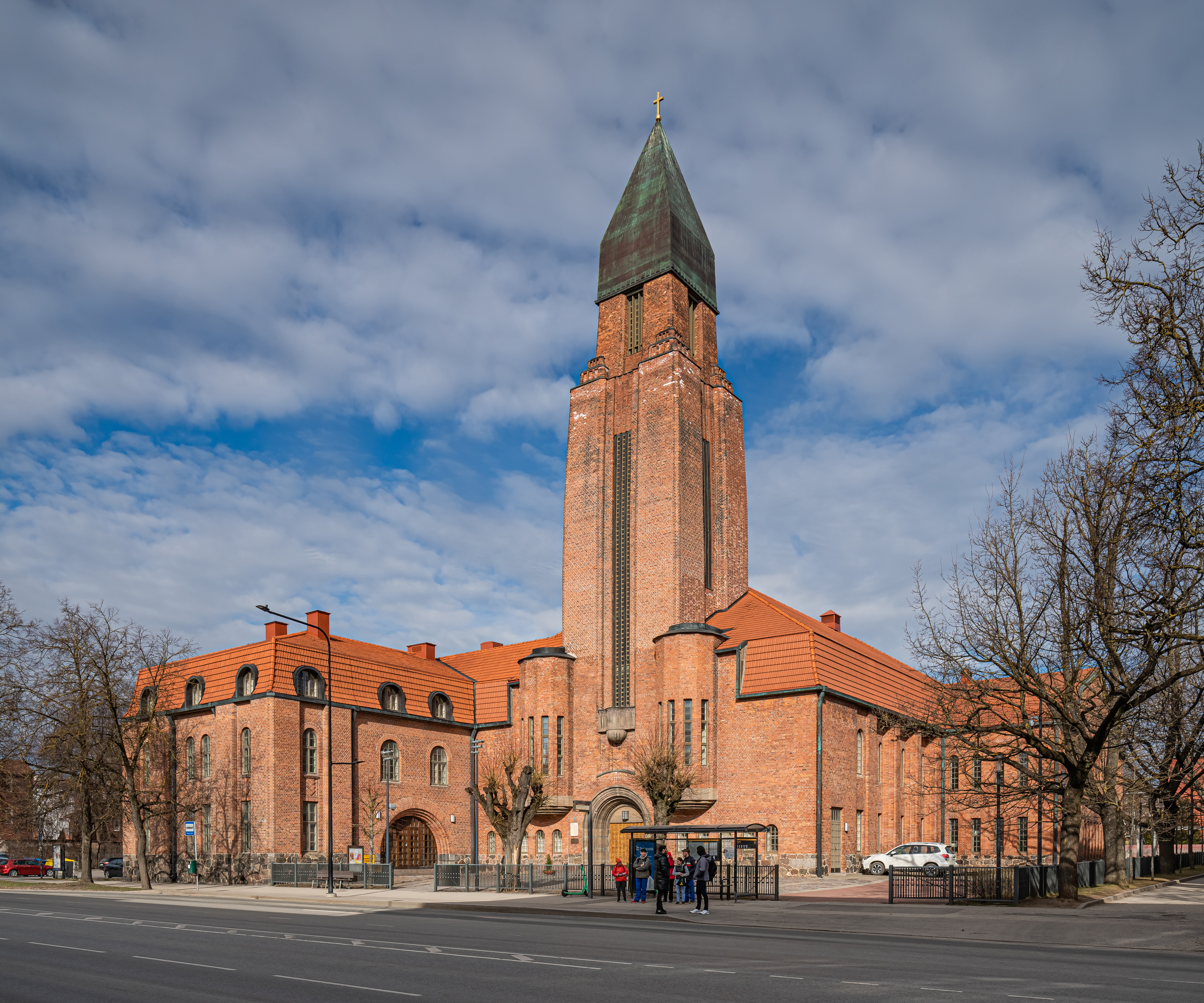
St Paul's Church, Tartu

=== Latvia ===
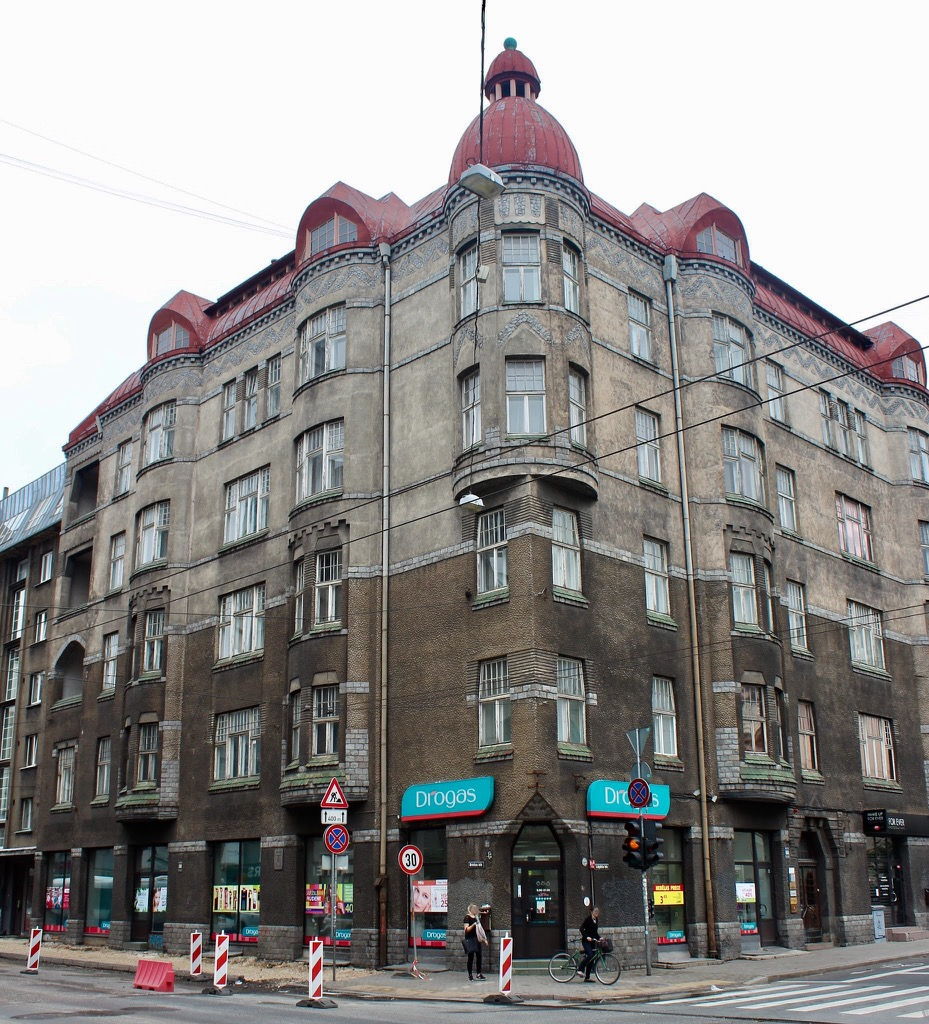
Building on Brīvības street 58, Riga. (Architect: A. Vanags)

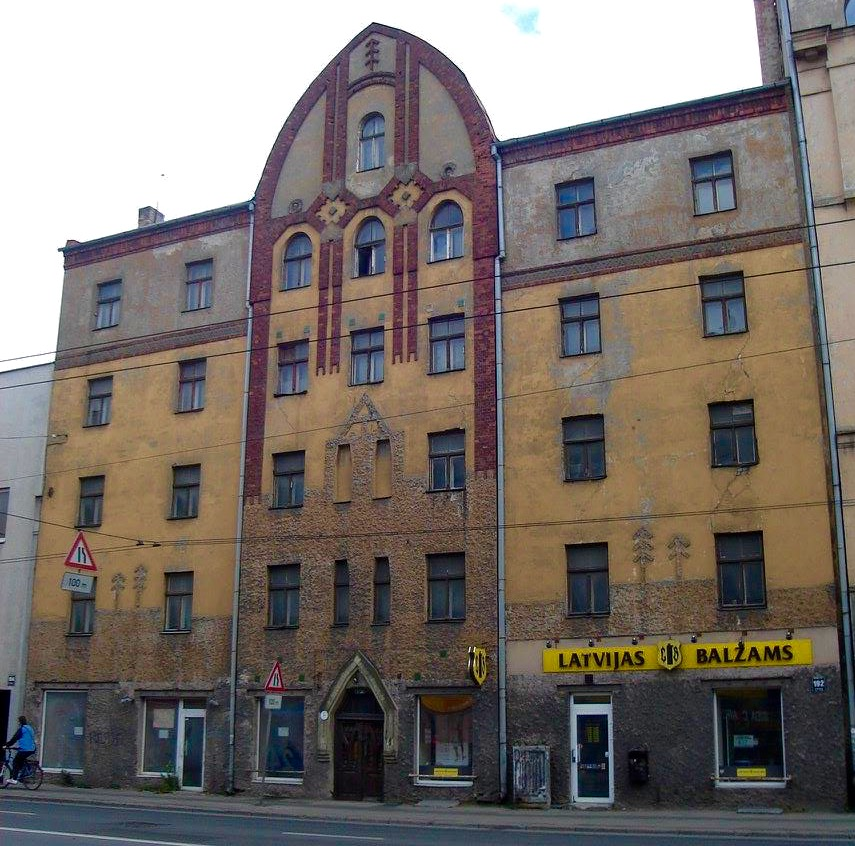
Building on Brīvības street 192, Riga. (Architect: K. Pēkšēns)

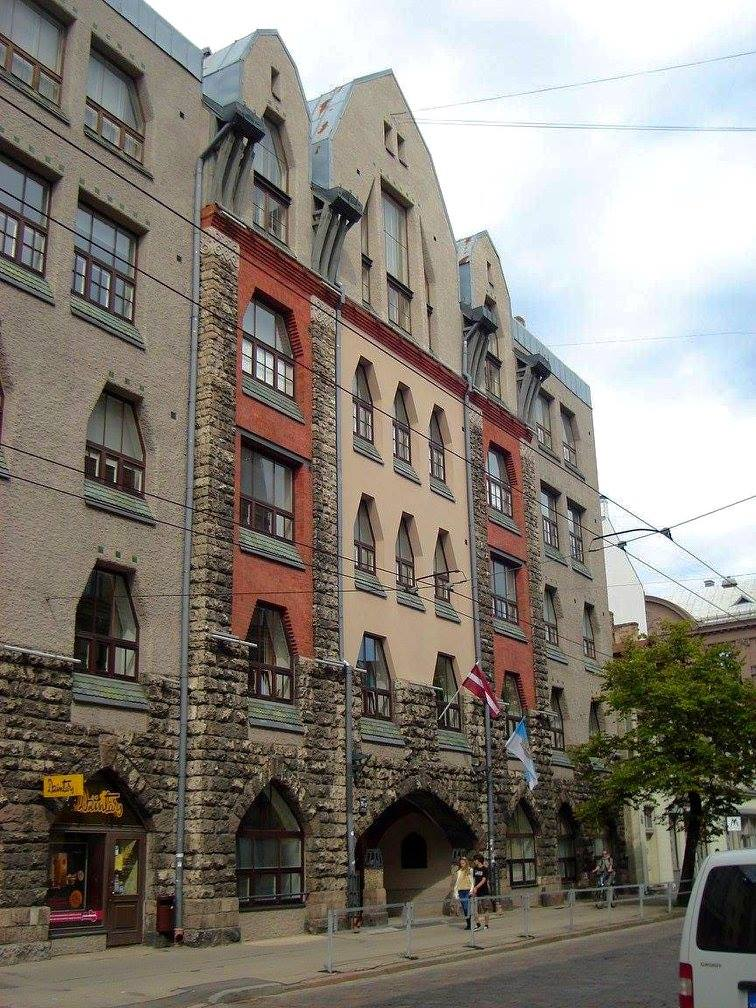
Building on Tērbatas street 15/17, Riga (Architect: K. Pēkšēns, E. Laube)

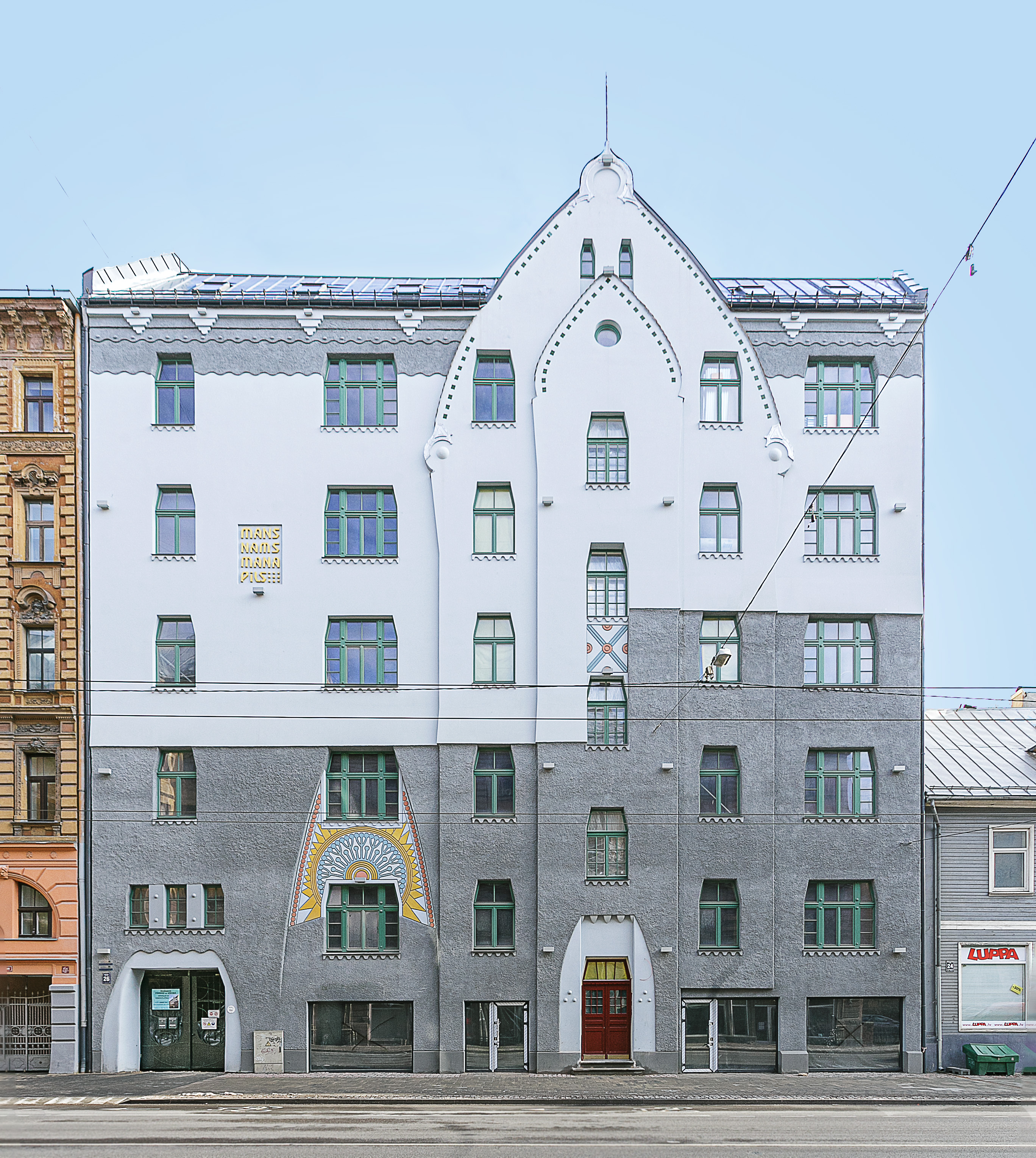
Building on A. Čaka street 26, Riga (Architect: K. Pēkšēns, E. Laube)

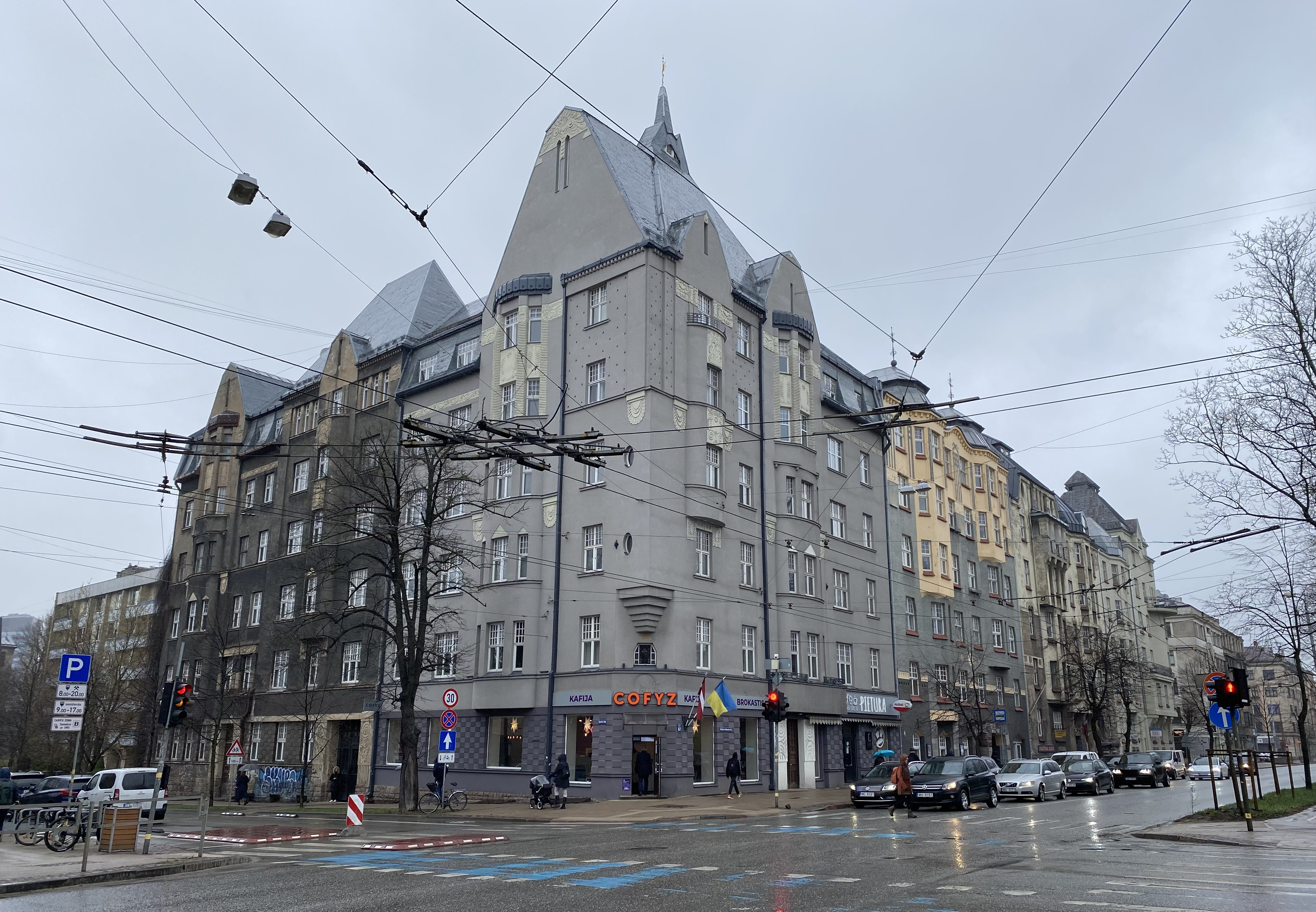
Building on Kr. Valdemāra street 67, Rīga (Architect: E. Laube)

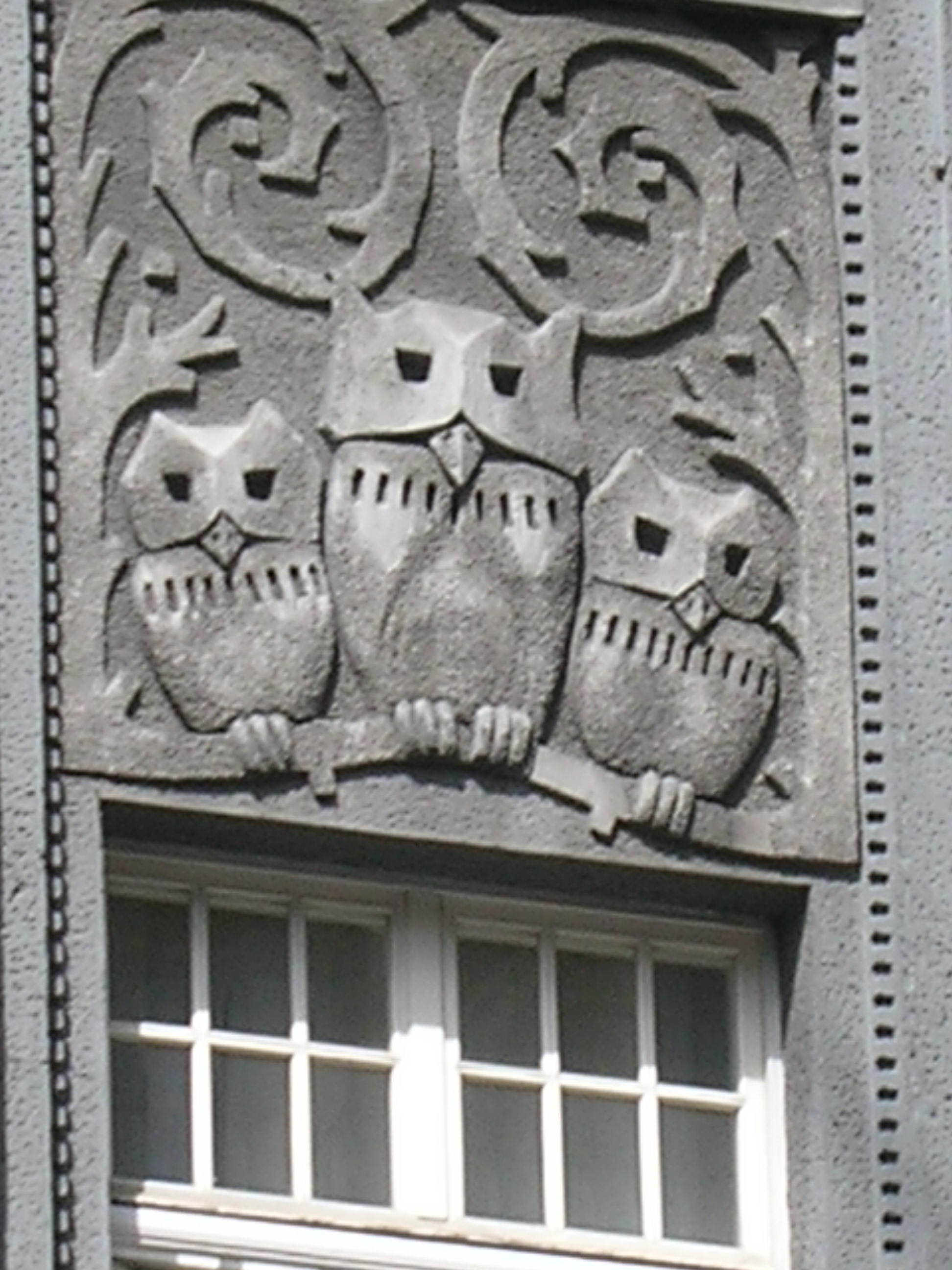
Detail from building on Brīvības street 37, Rīga (Architect: E. Laube)

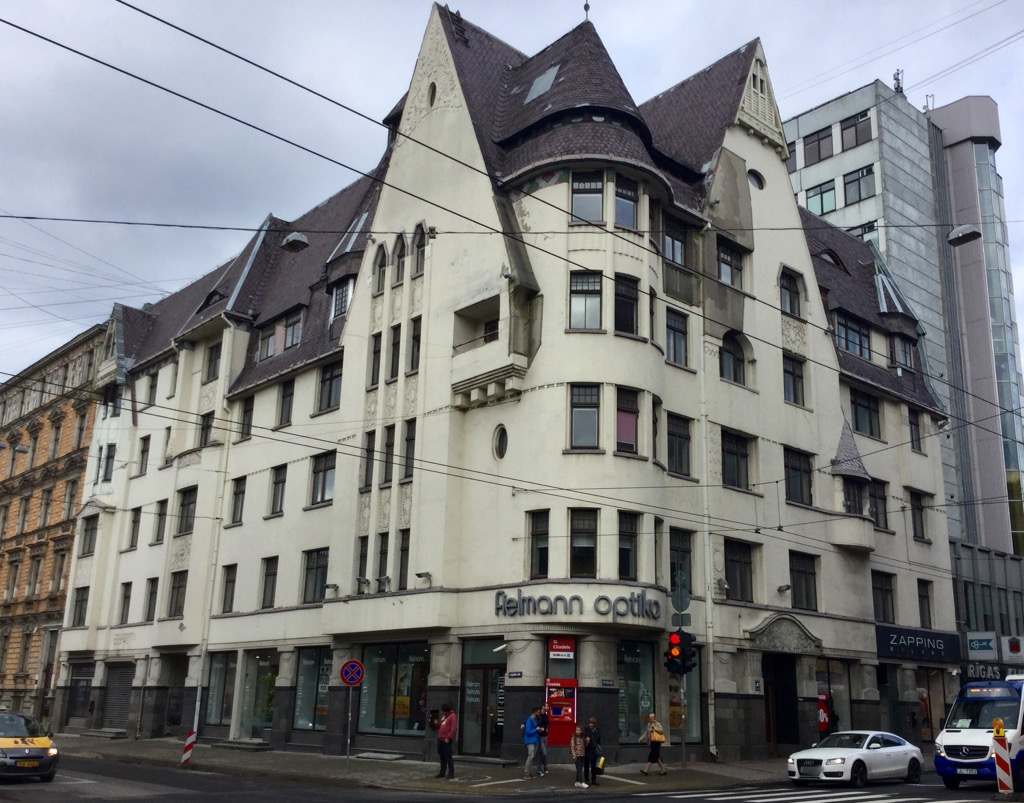
Building on Brīvības street 47, Rīga (Architect: E. Laube)

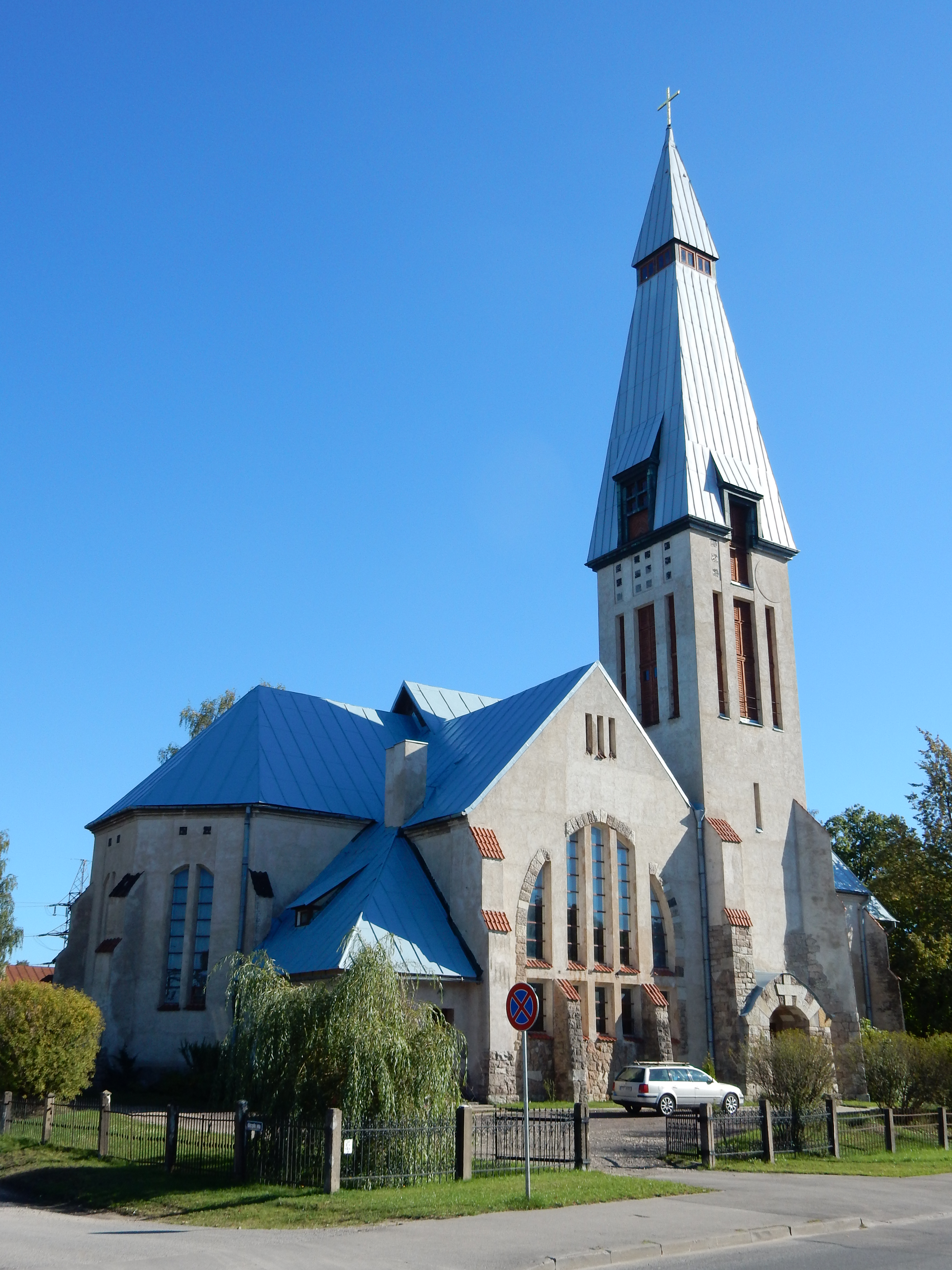
Church of the Cross on Ropažu street 120, Rīga (Architect: W. Bockslaff)

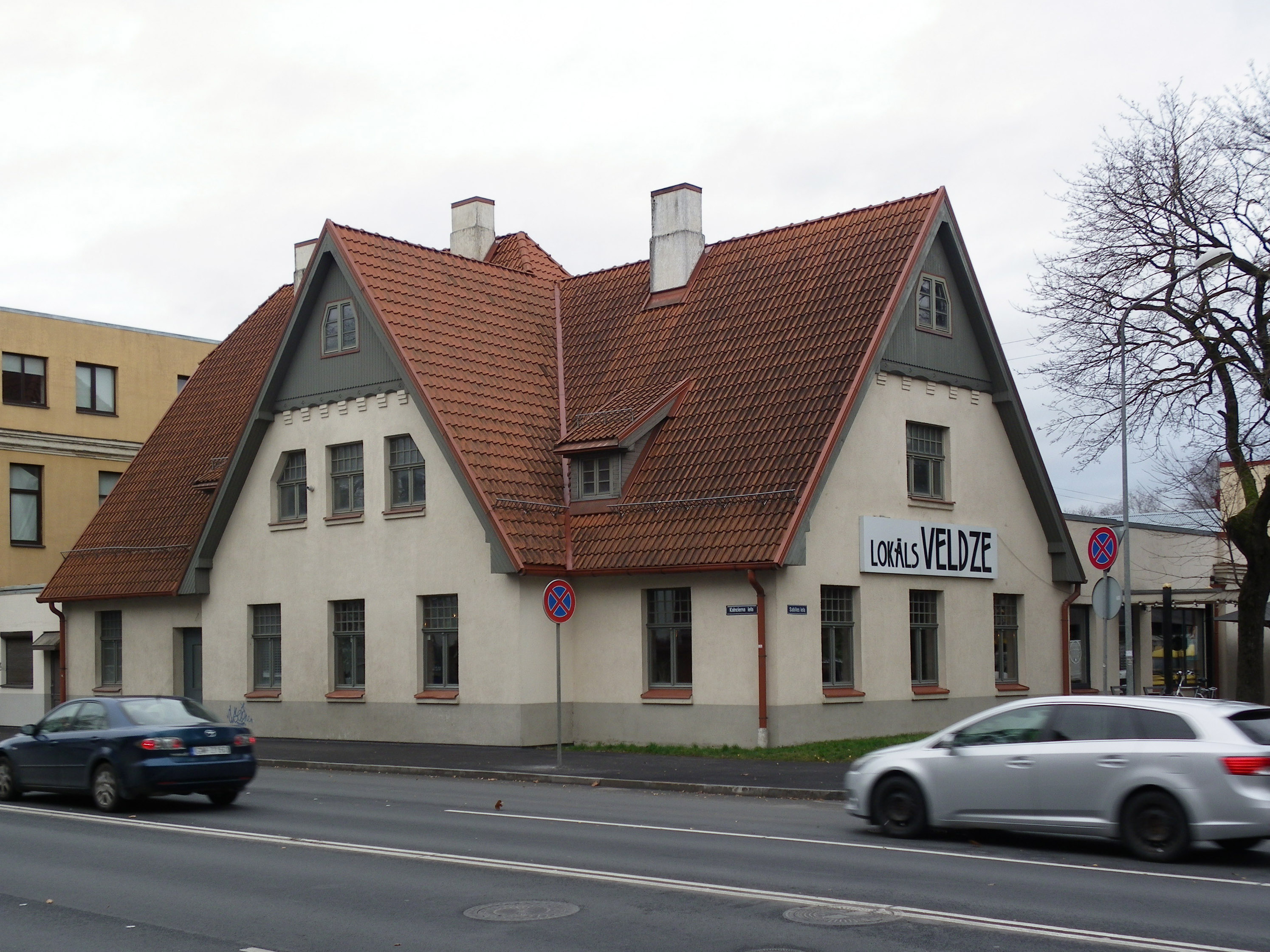
Building on Kalnciema street 40F, Rīga (Architect: K. Pēkšēns)

=== Denmark ===
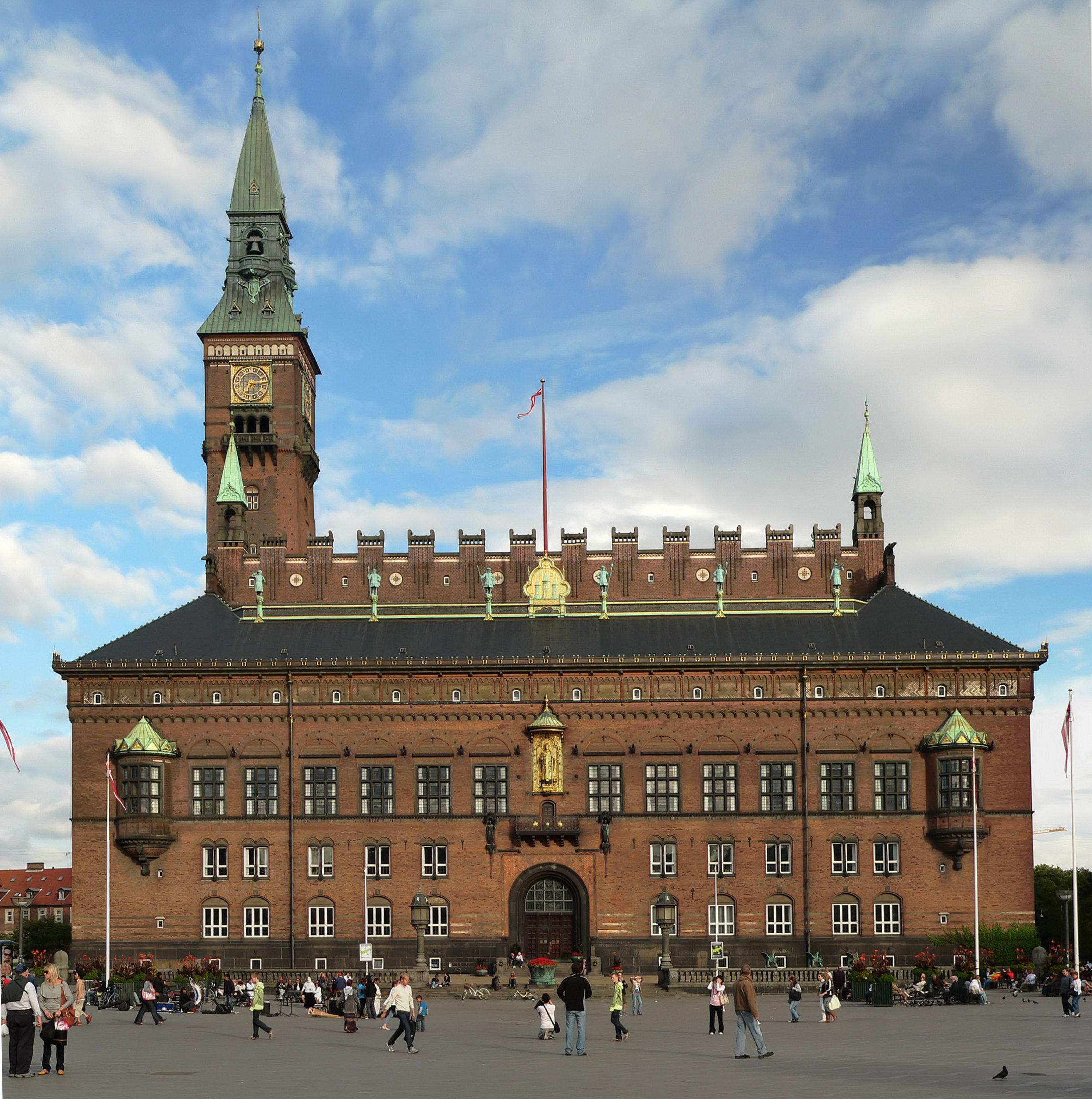
Copenhagen City Hall

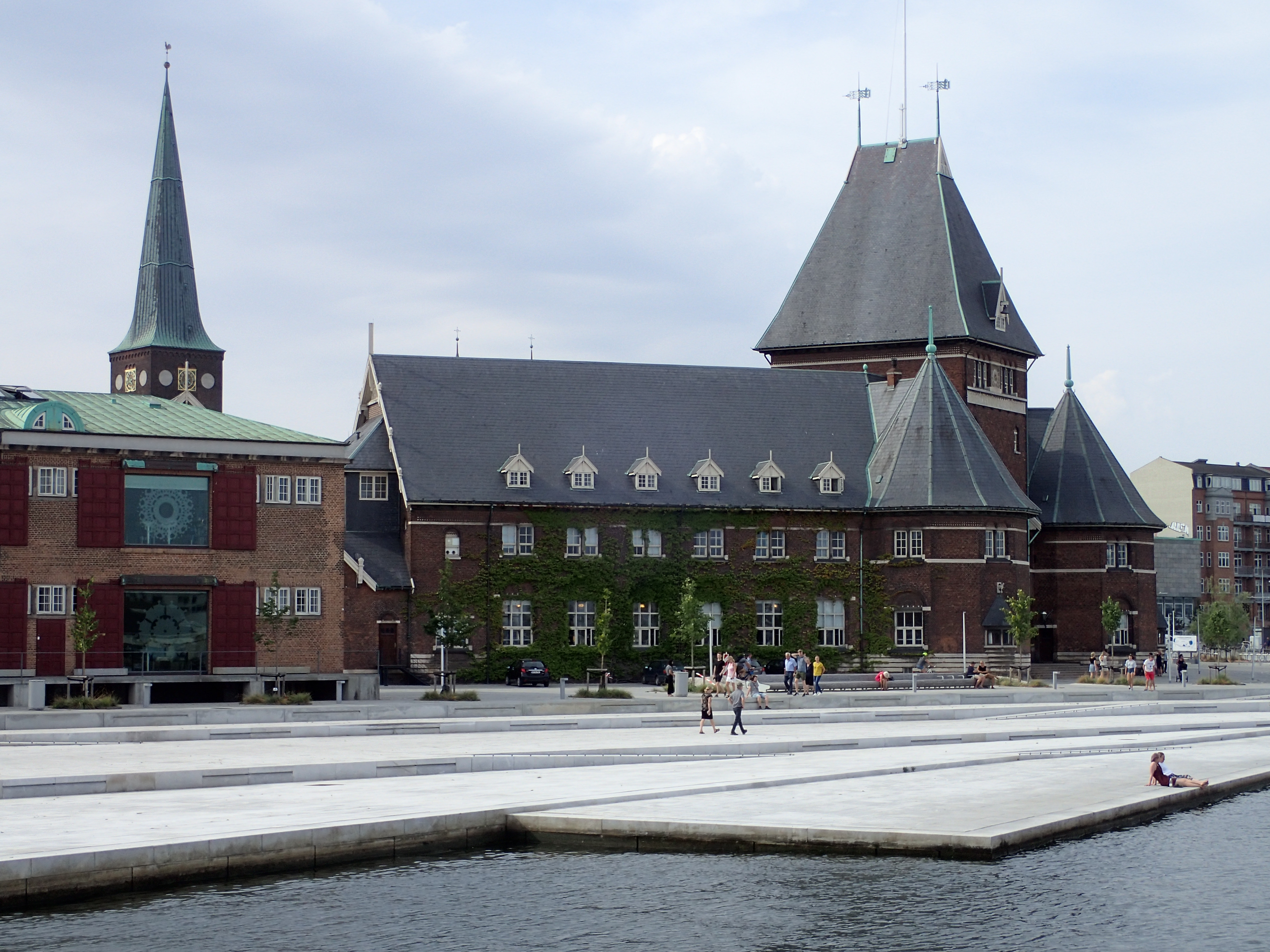
Aarhus Custom House

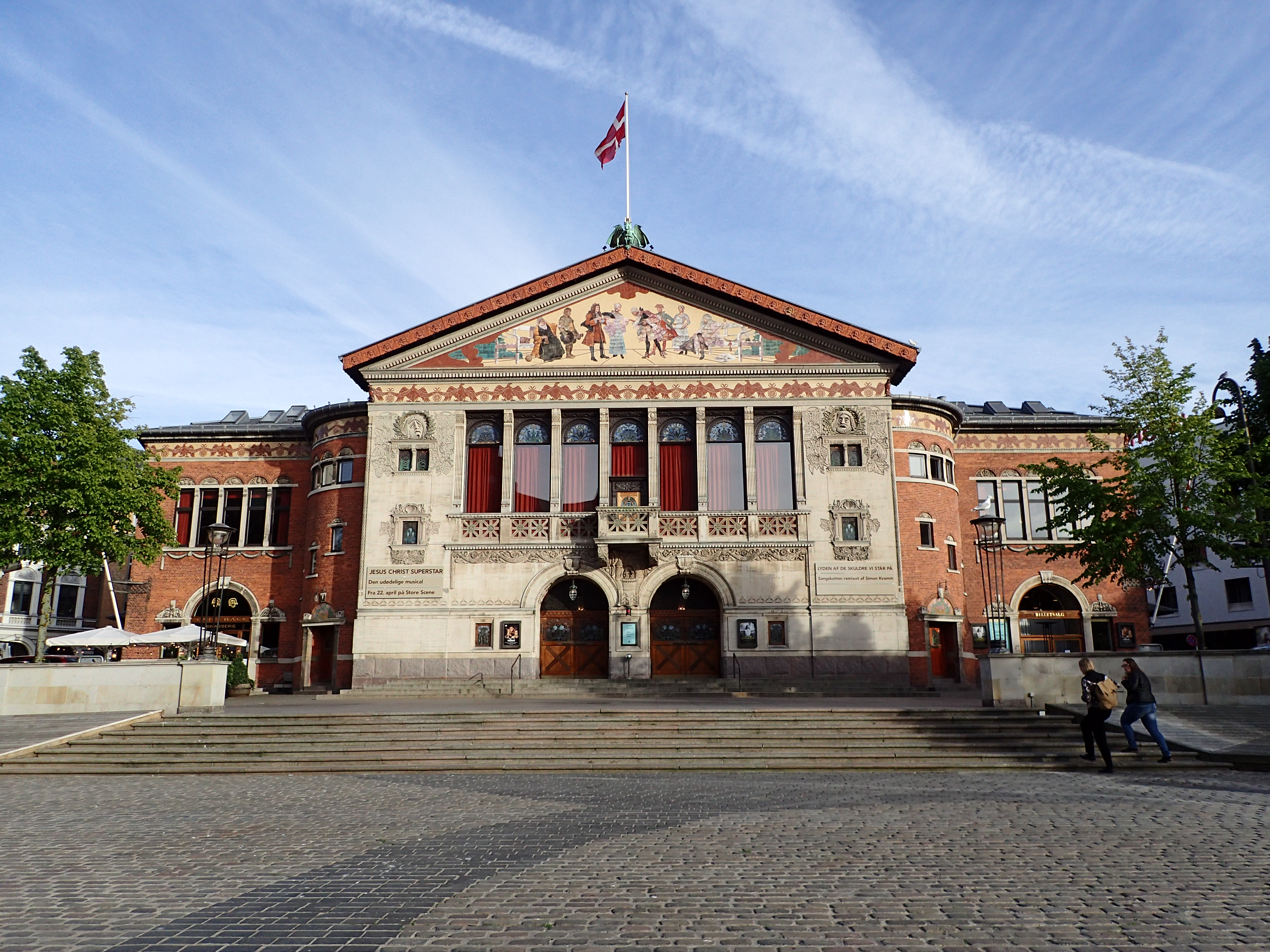
Aarhus Theatre

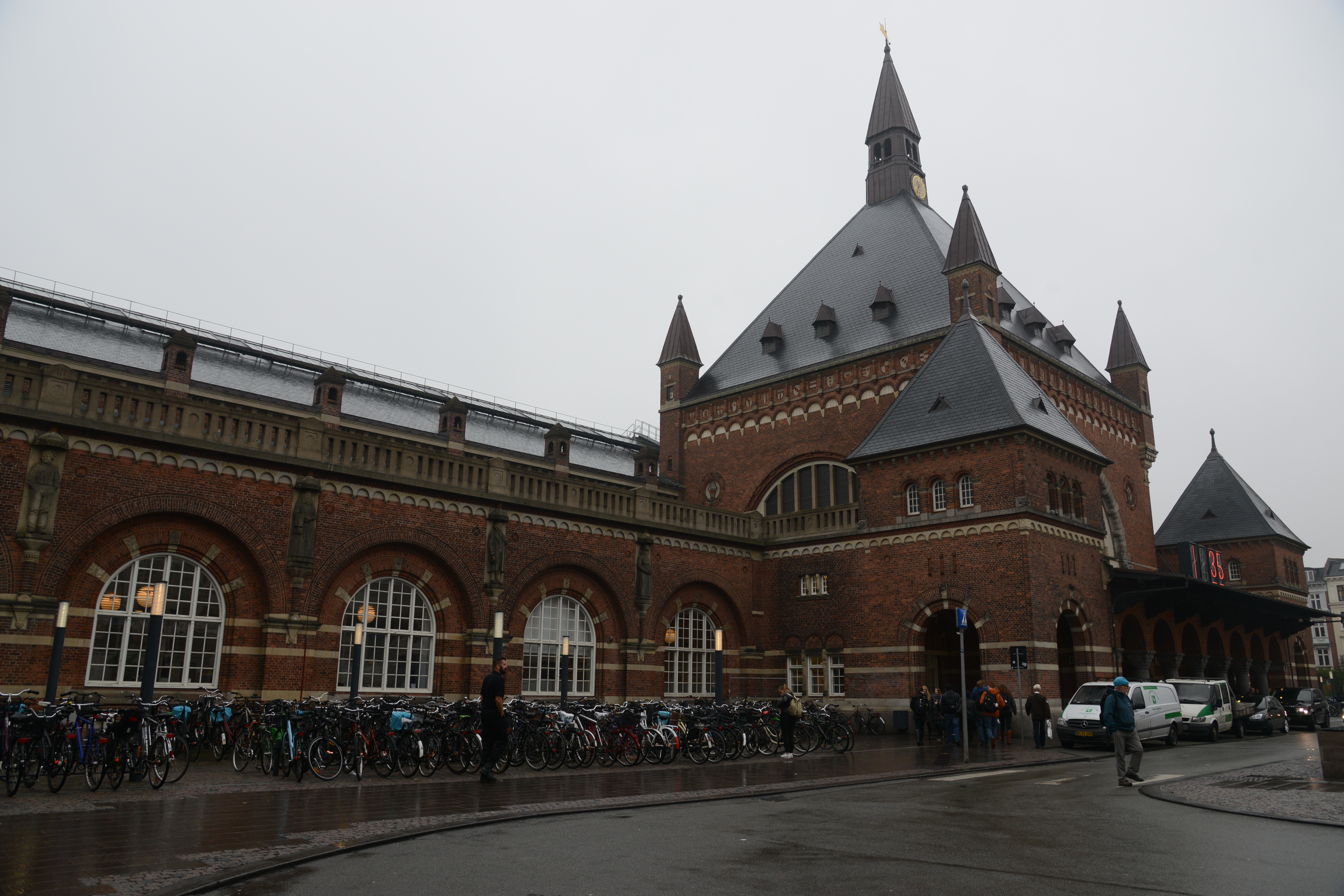
Copenhagen Central Station

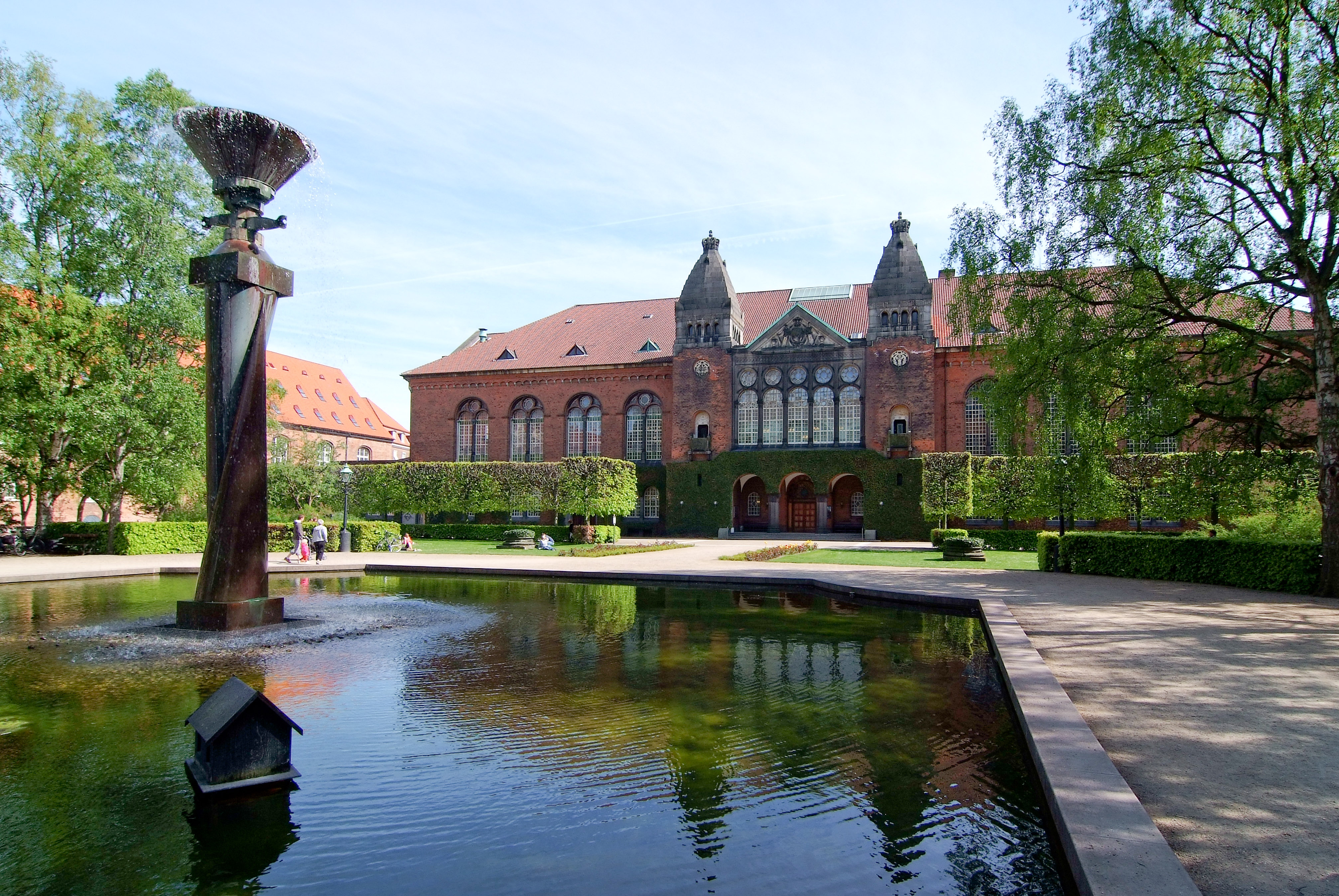
The Royal Library

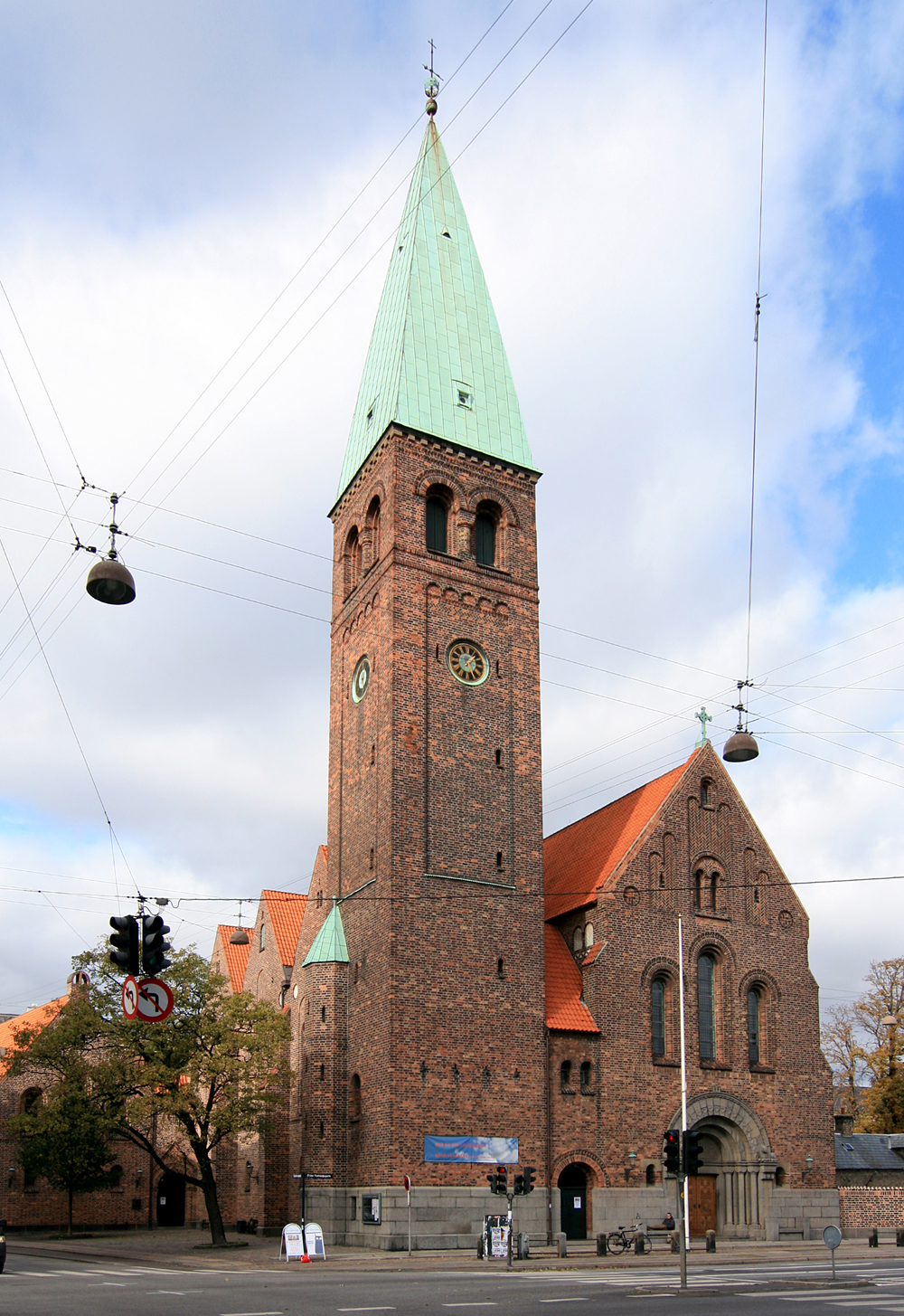
St. Andrew's Church

=== Russia ===
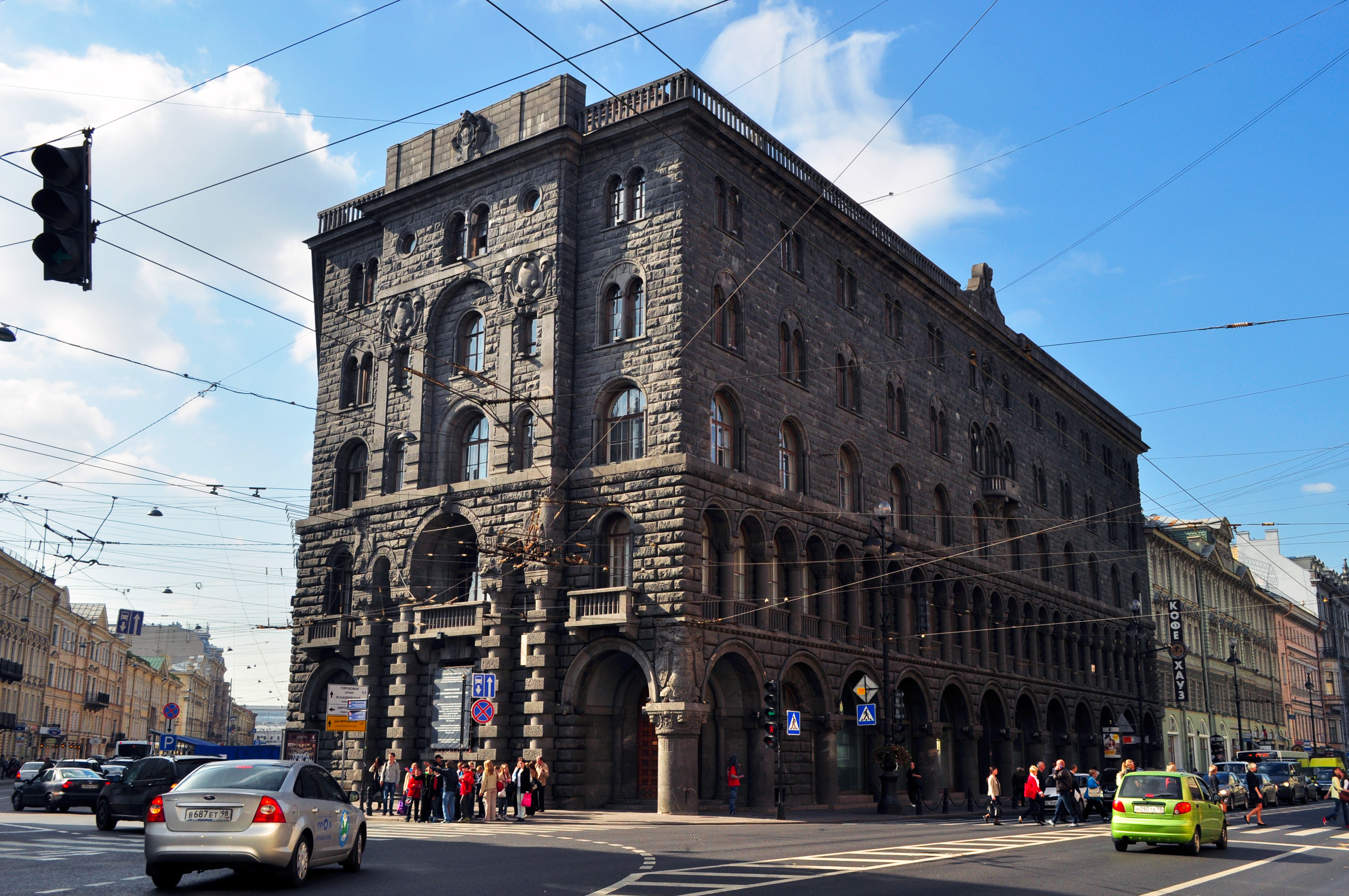
Wawelberg Bank

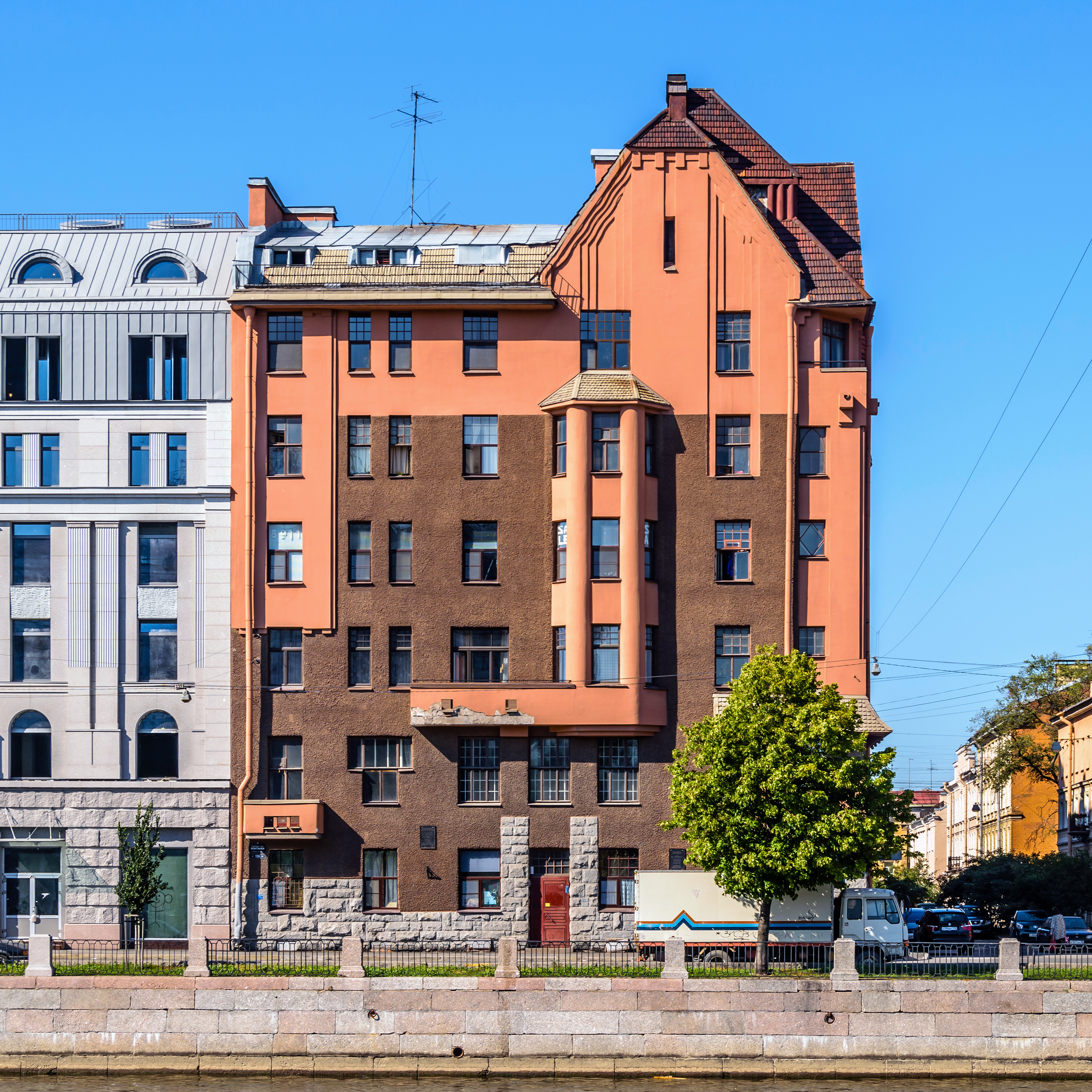
Kapustin house

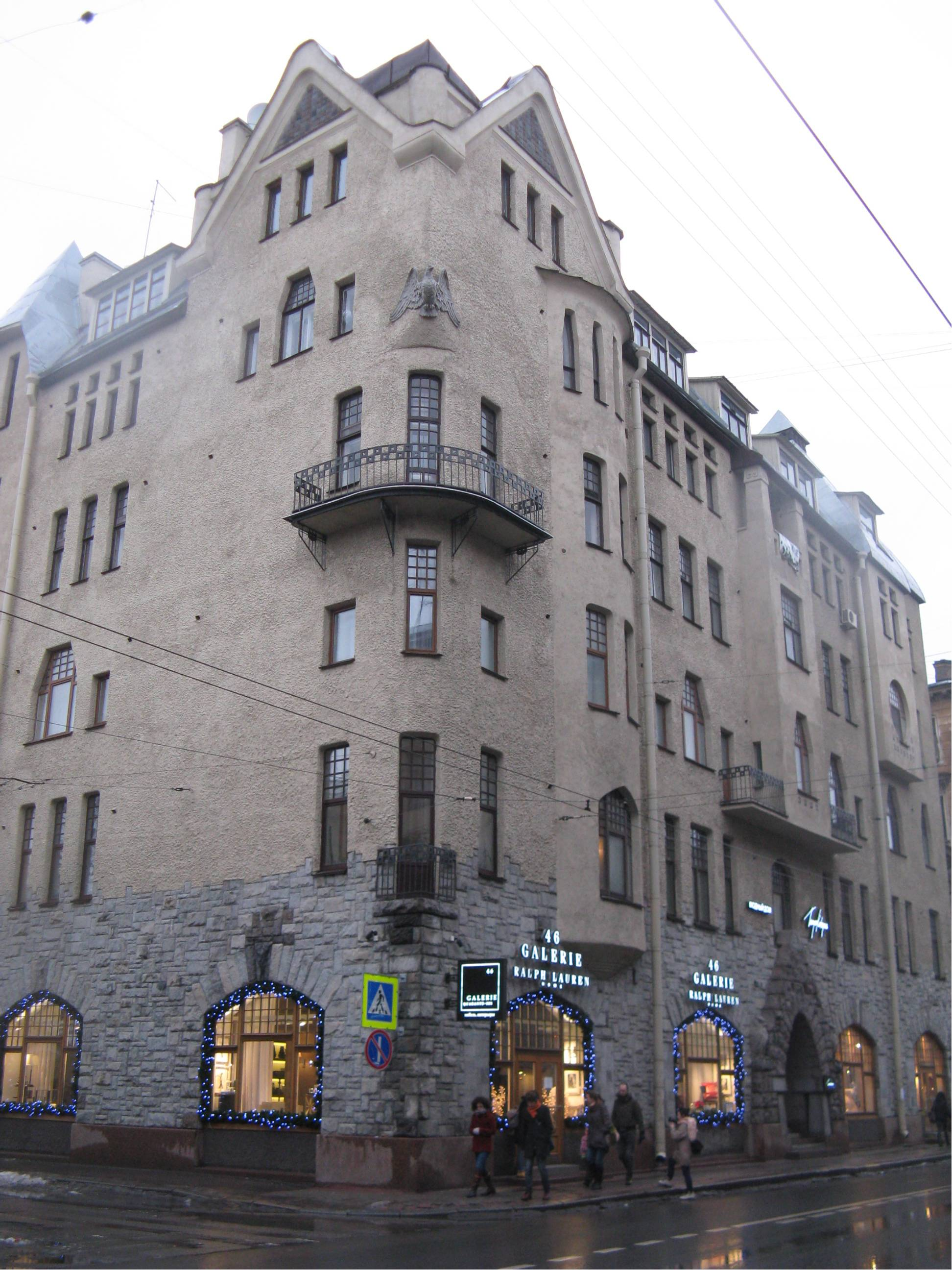
Putilova house (The Owl House)

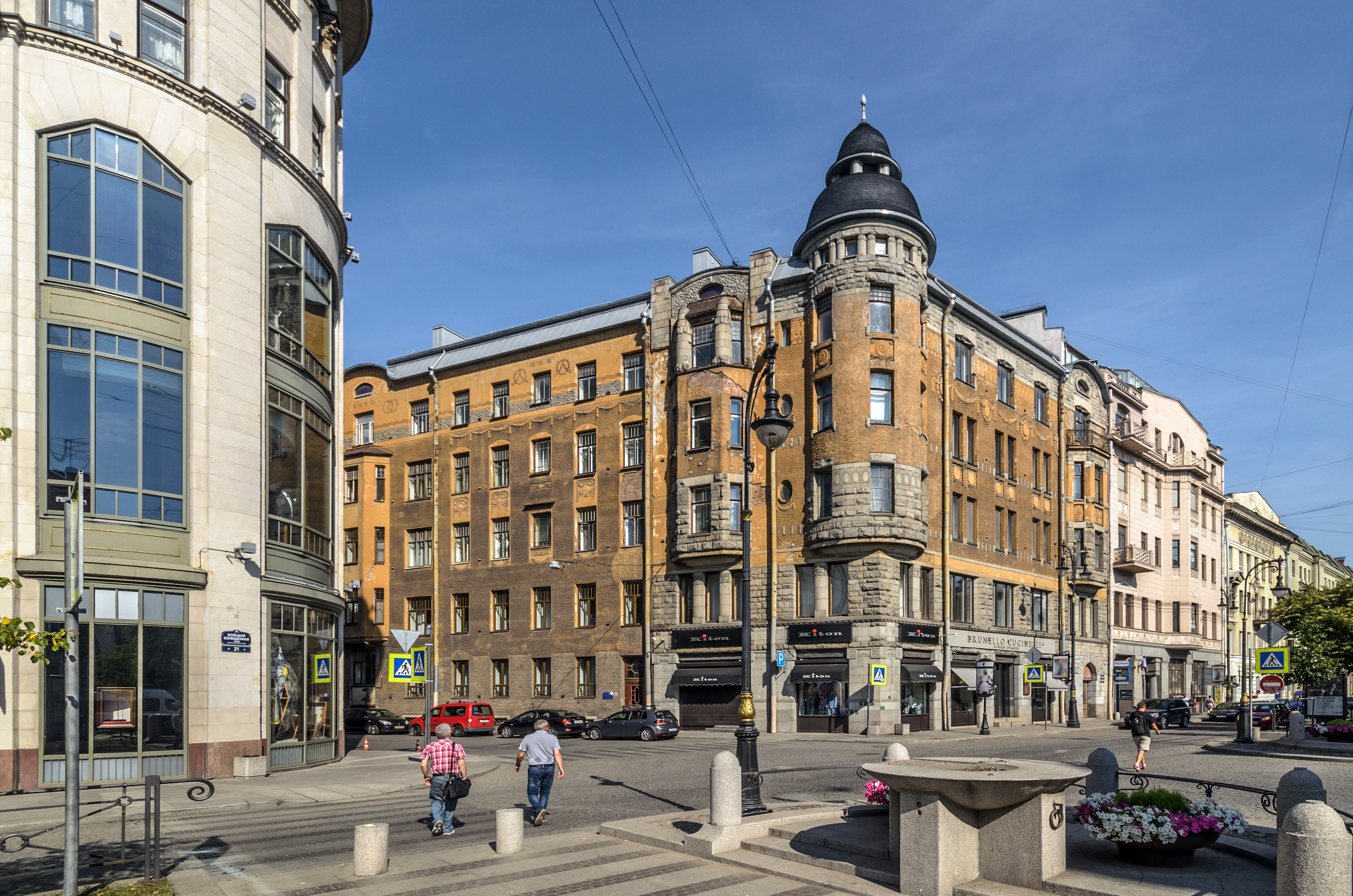
Melzer Revenue house

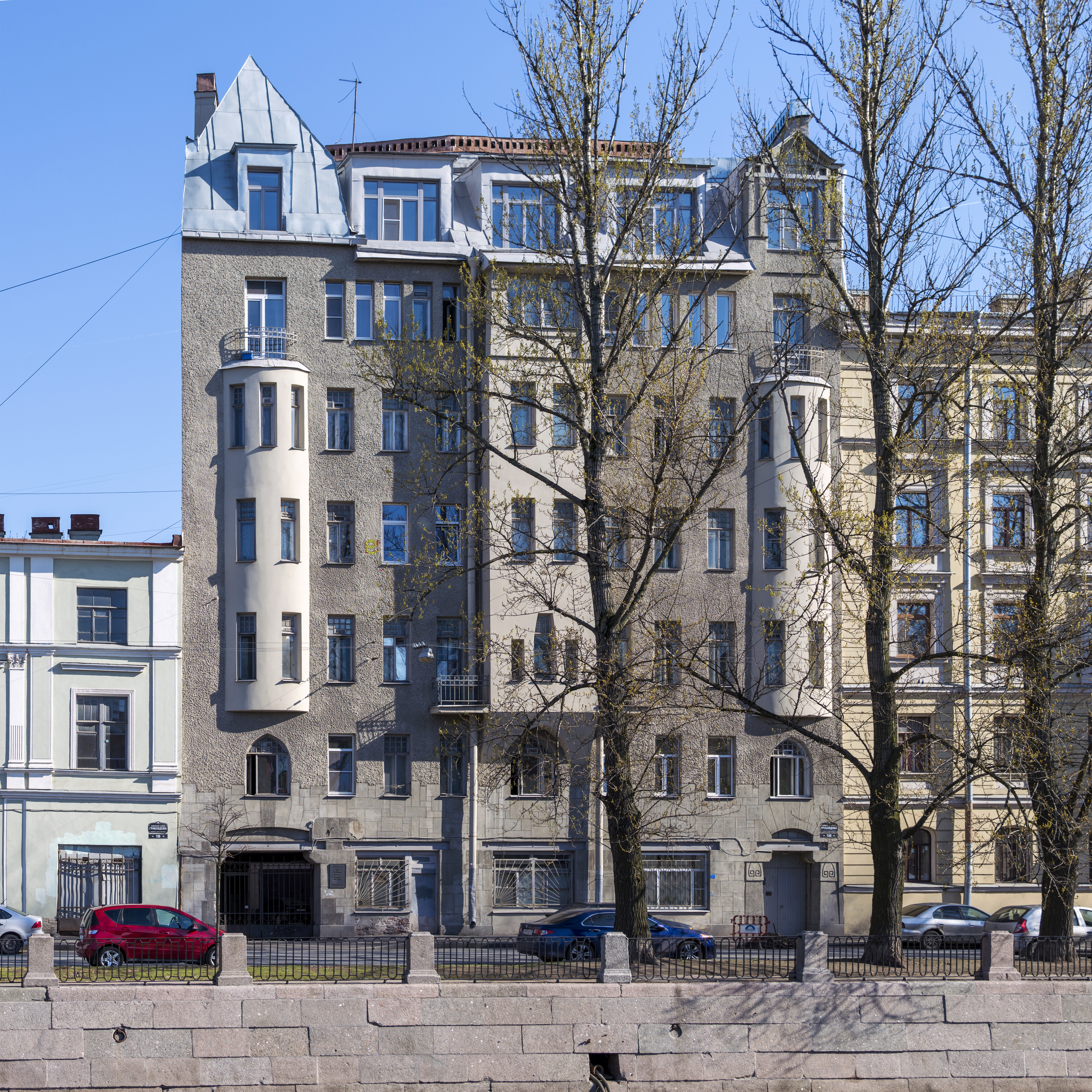
Traynin hoyse

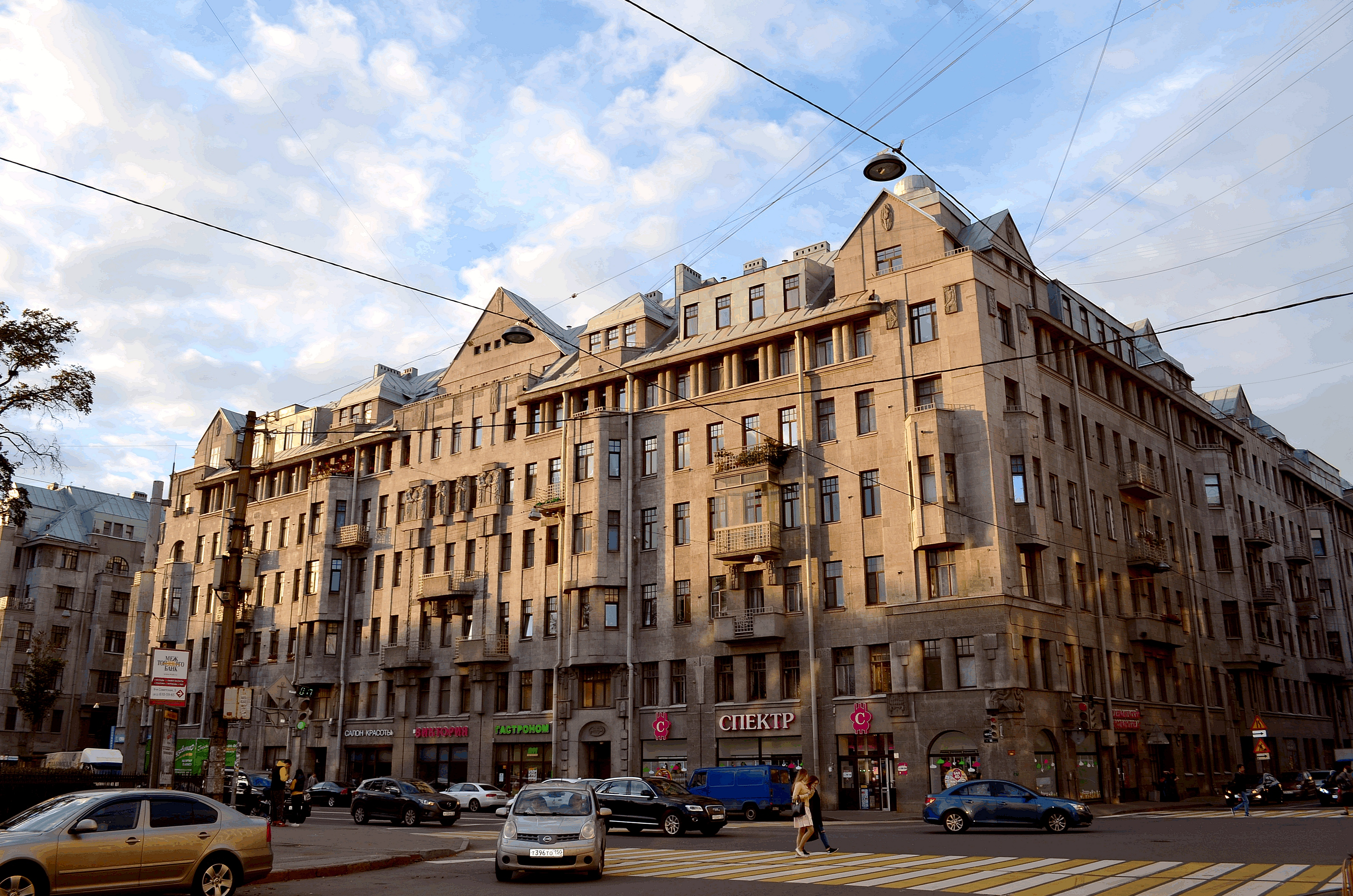
Basseynaya Community of Apartment Owners buildings

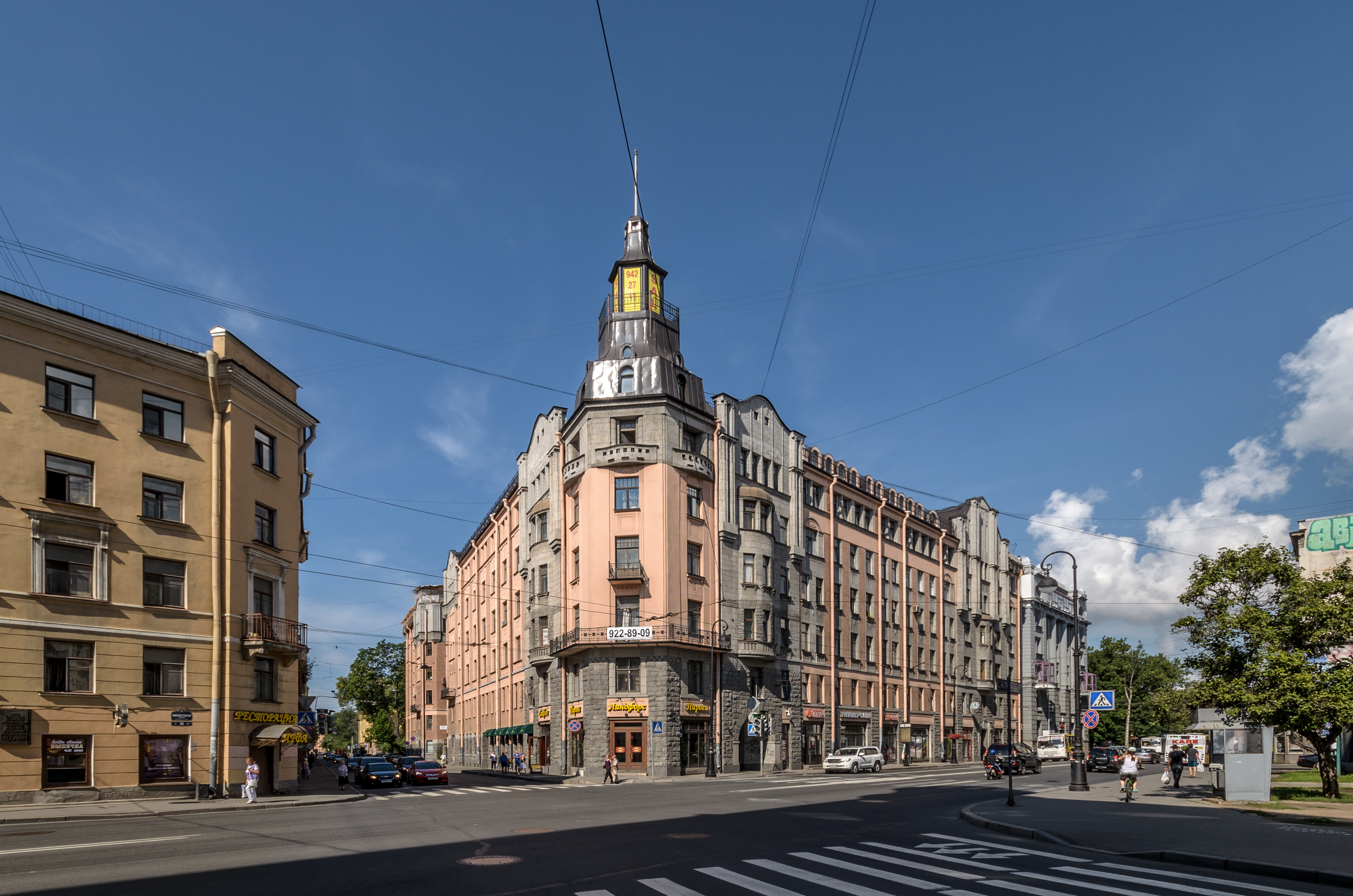
Bernstein house

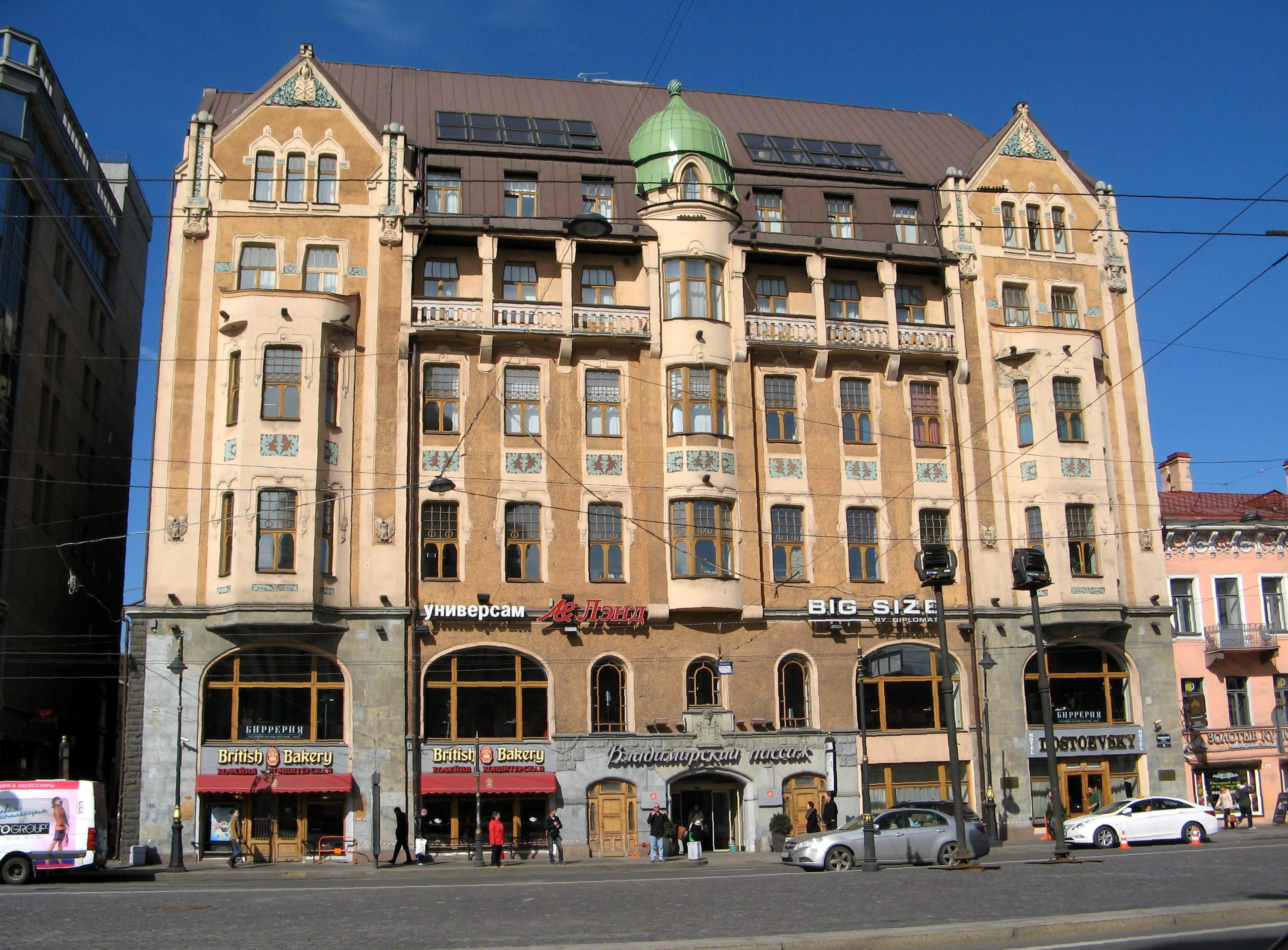
Basser house

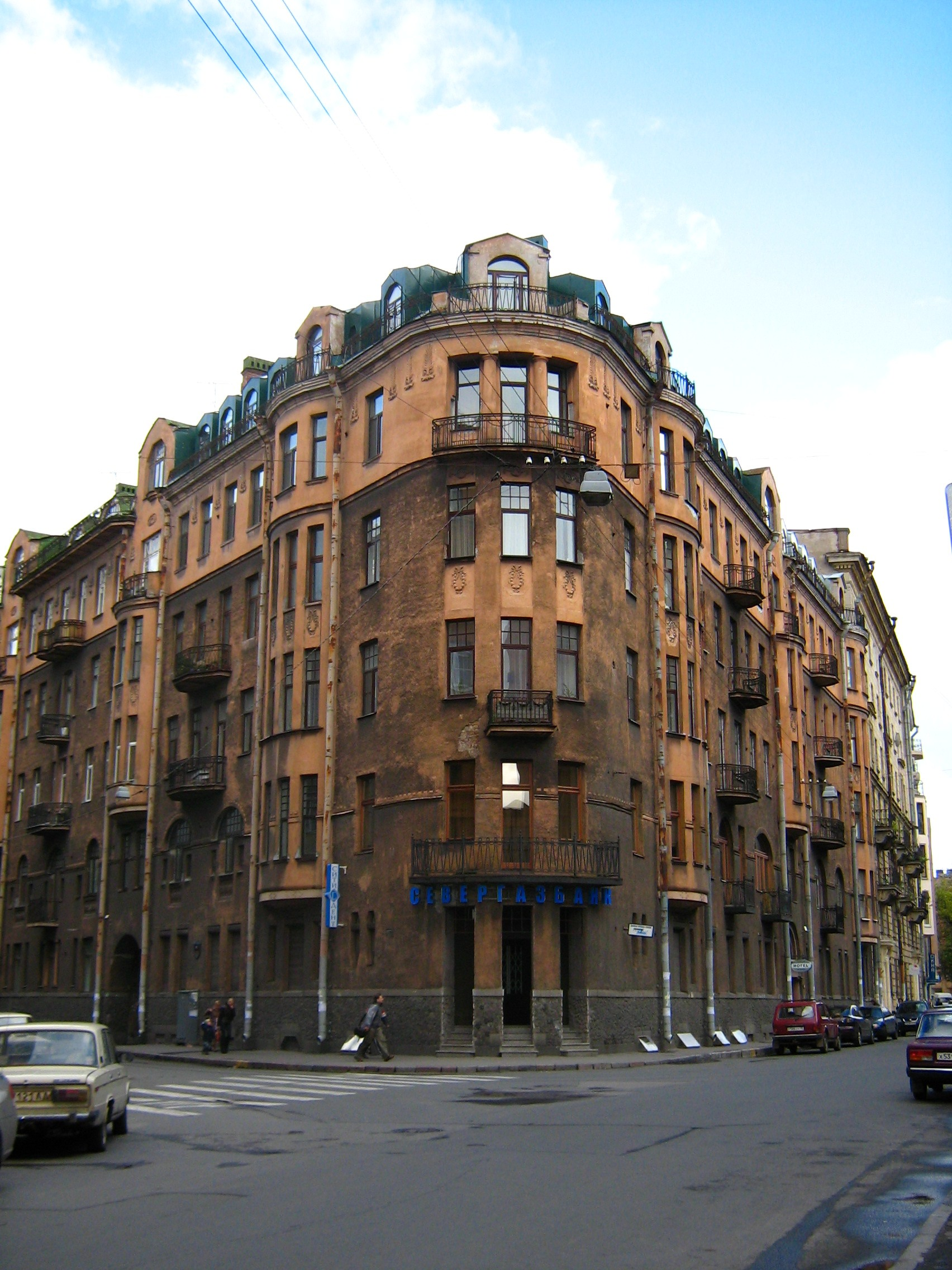
Zazersky house

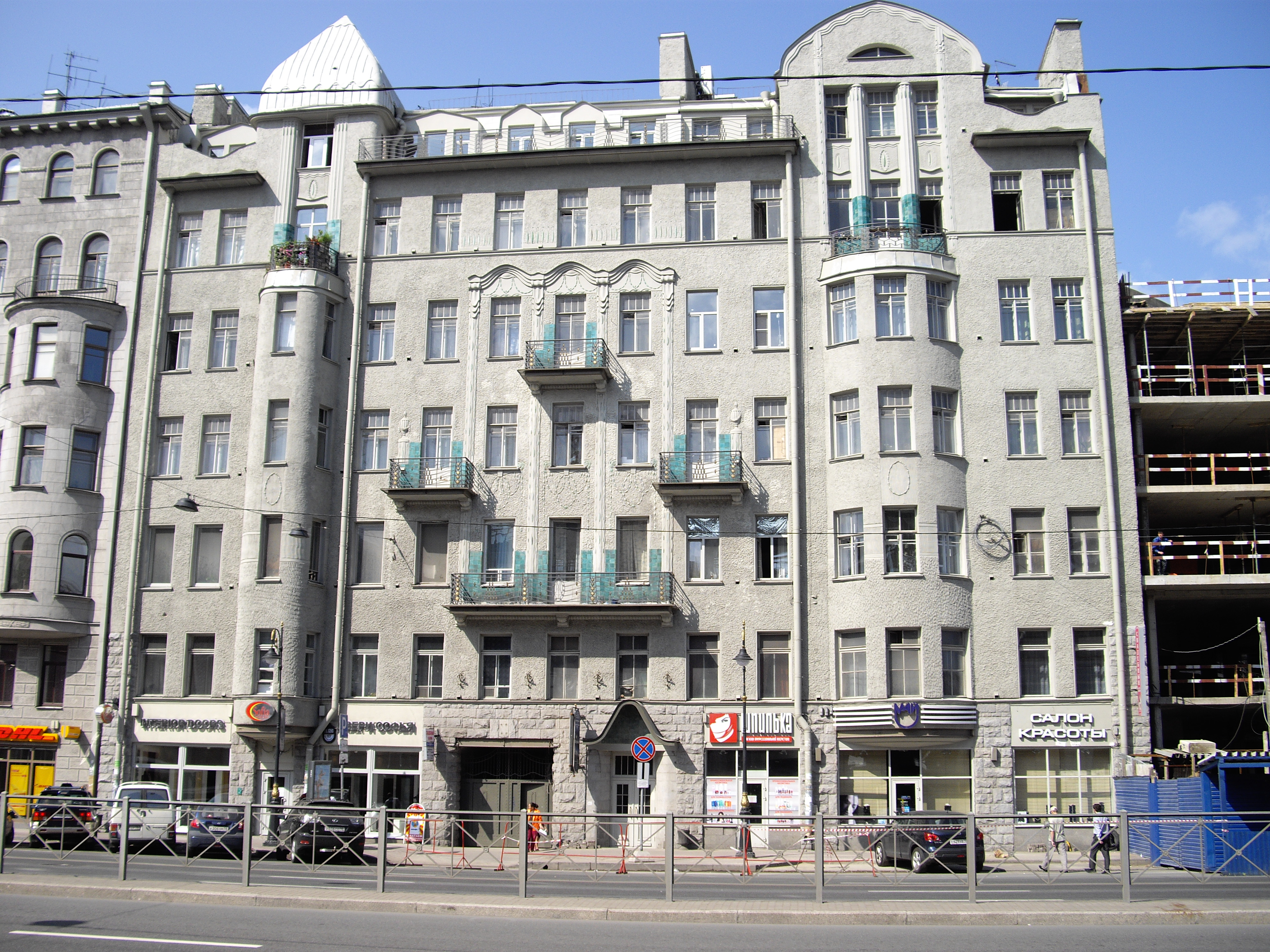
Markozov house

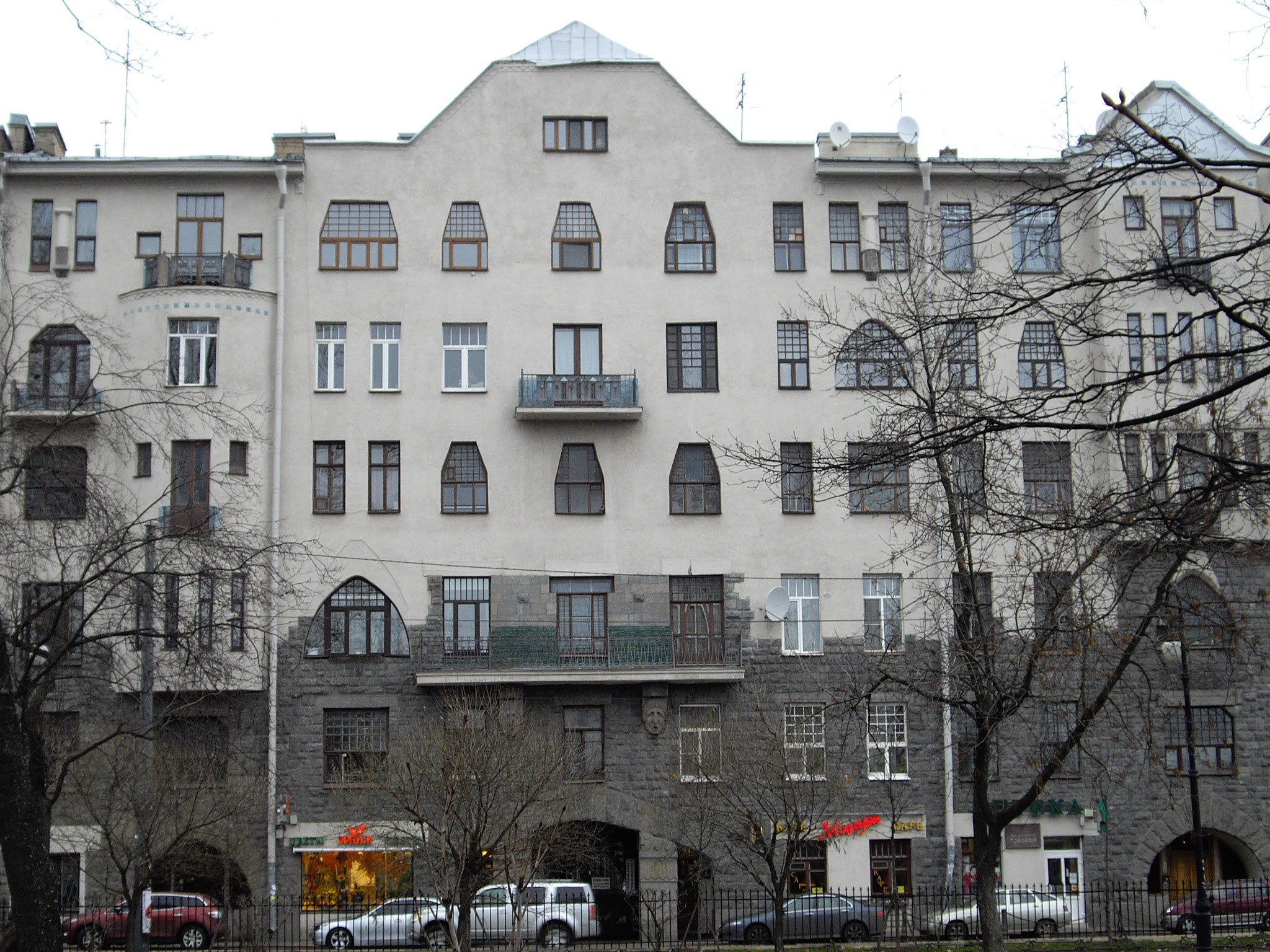
Barsova house

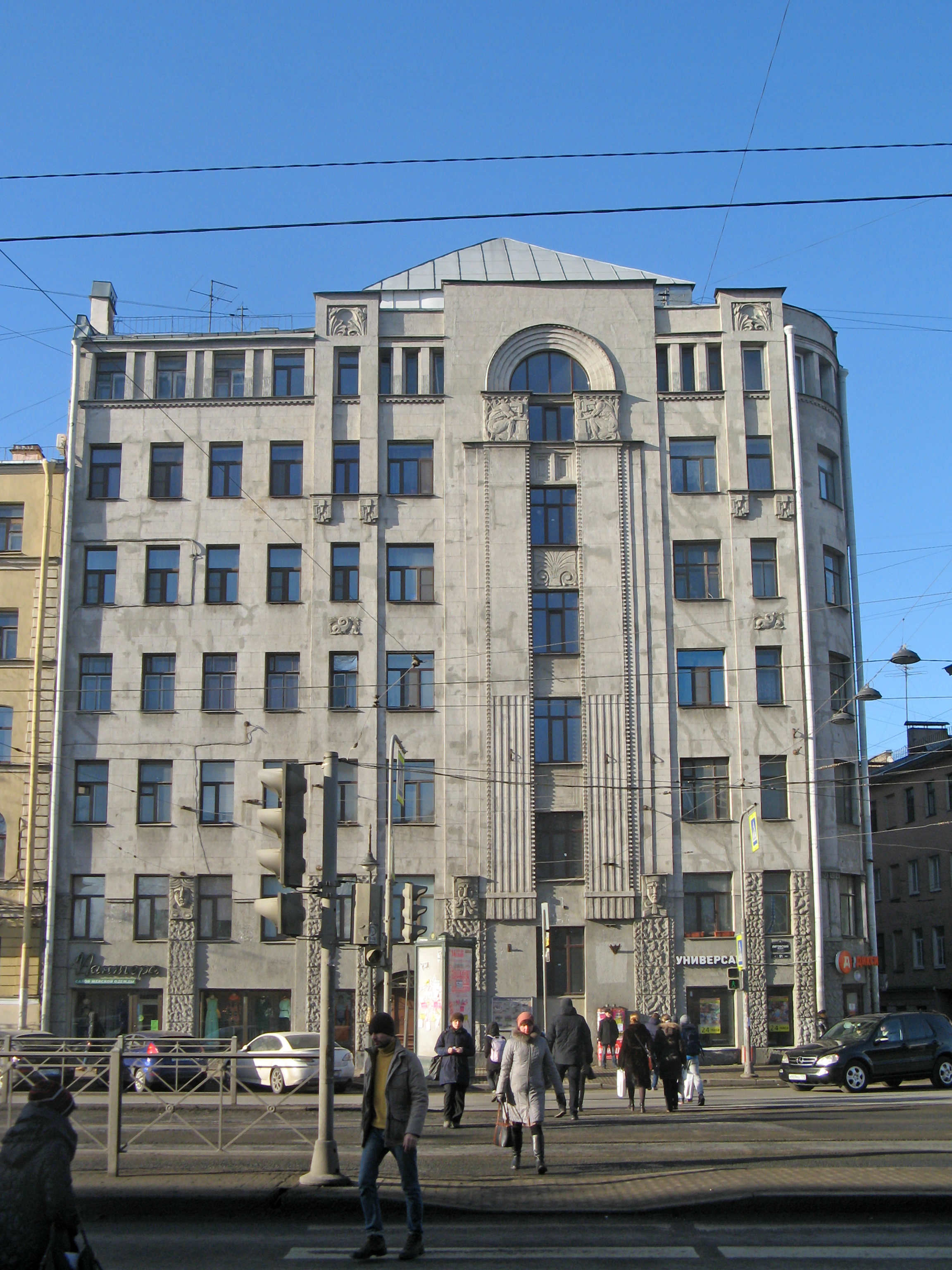
Sagalov house

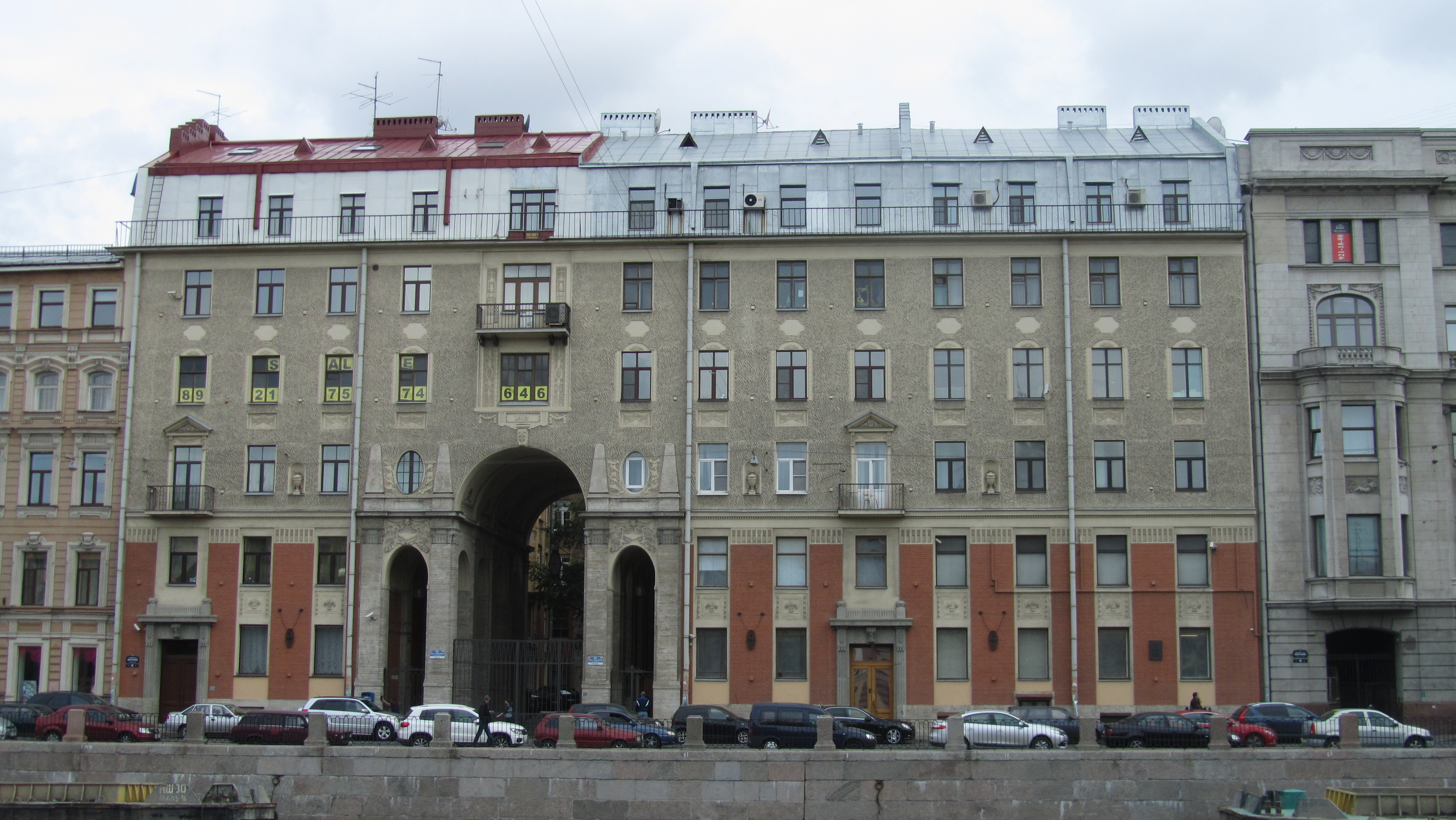
Tolstoy House

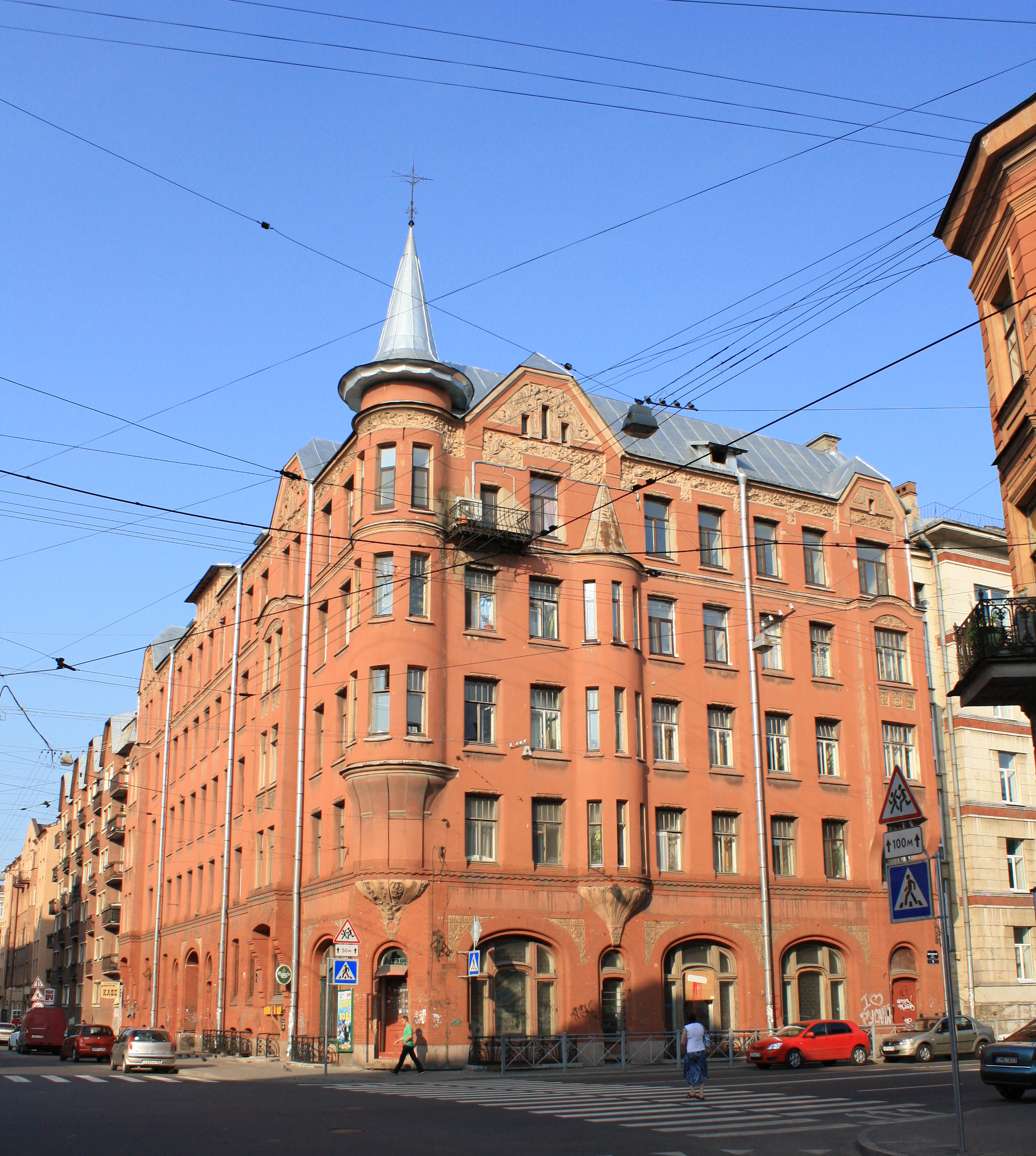
Schmidt house

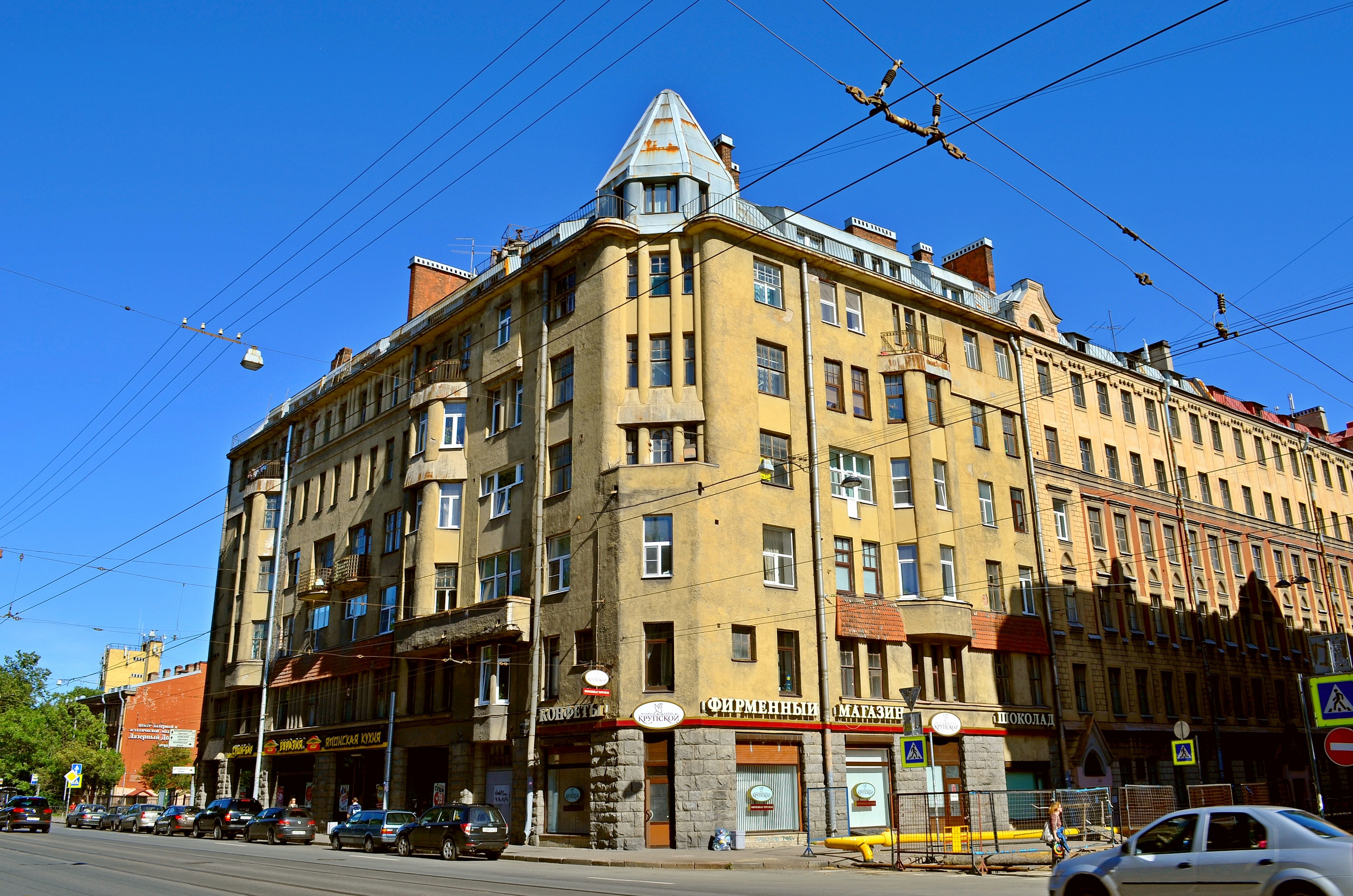
House of the Latvian Church

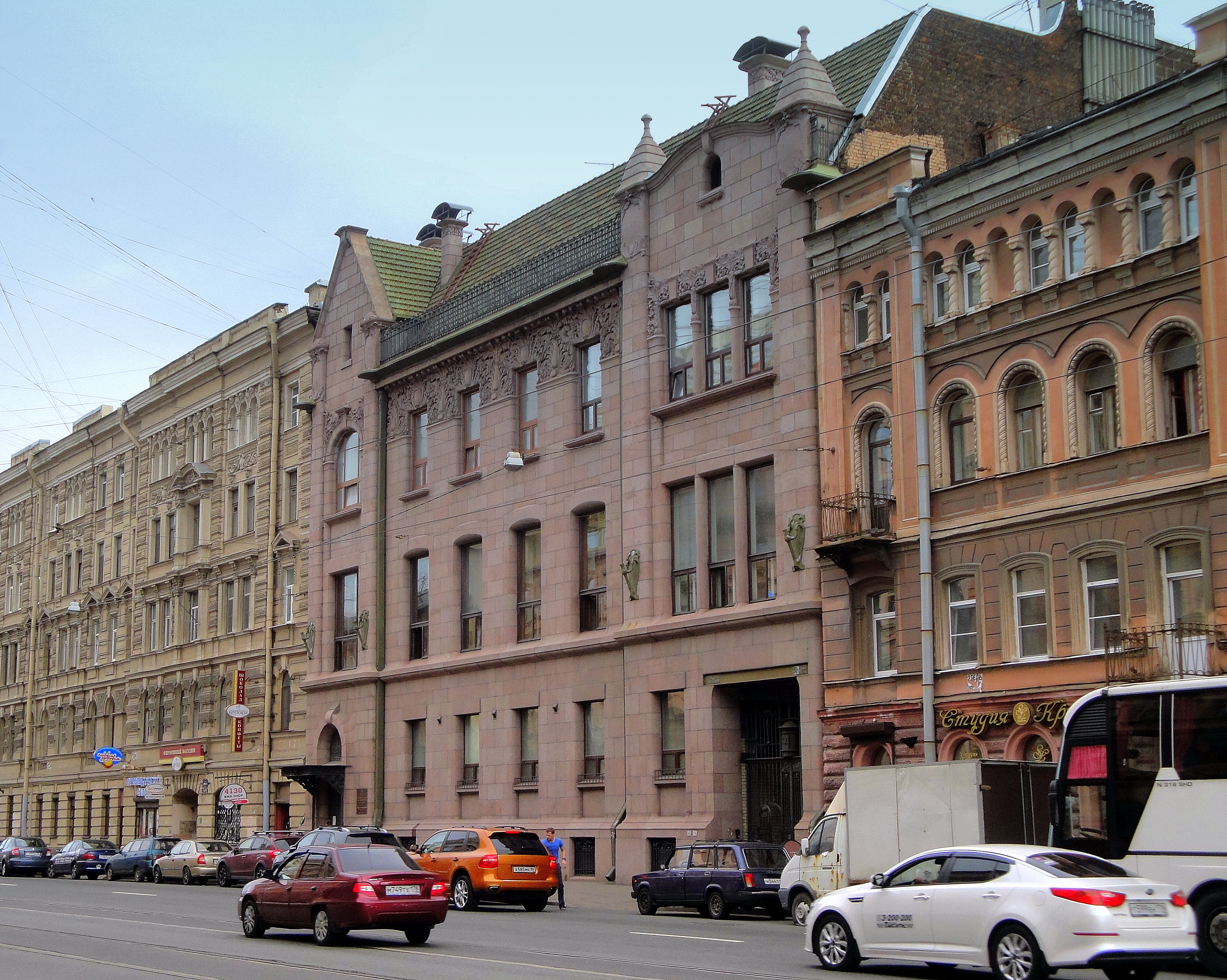
Bazhanov house

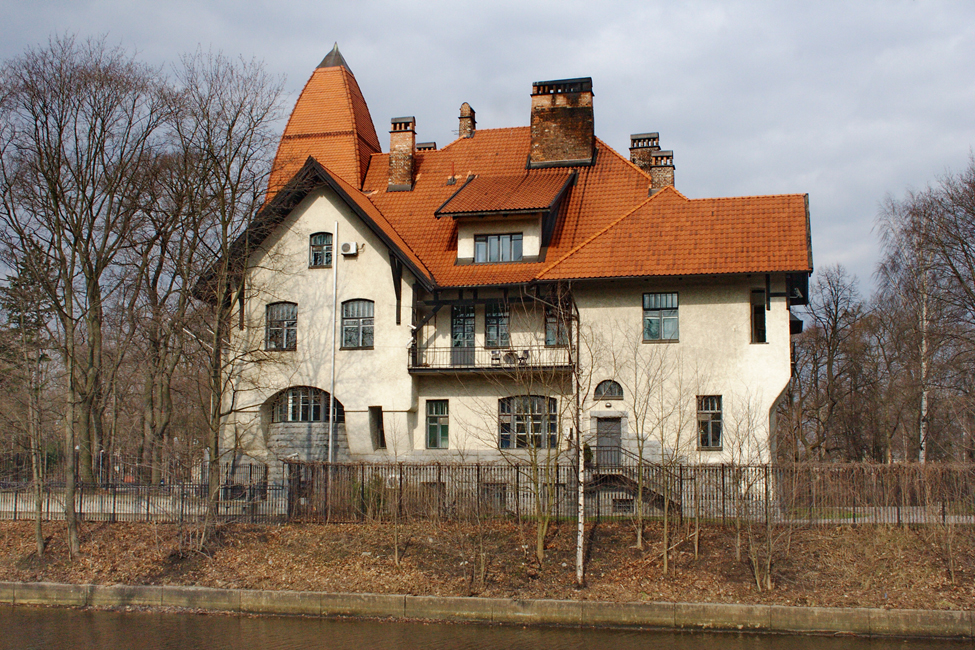
Vollenweider house

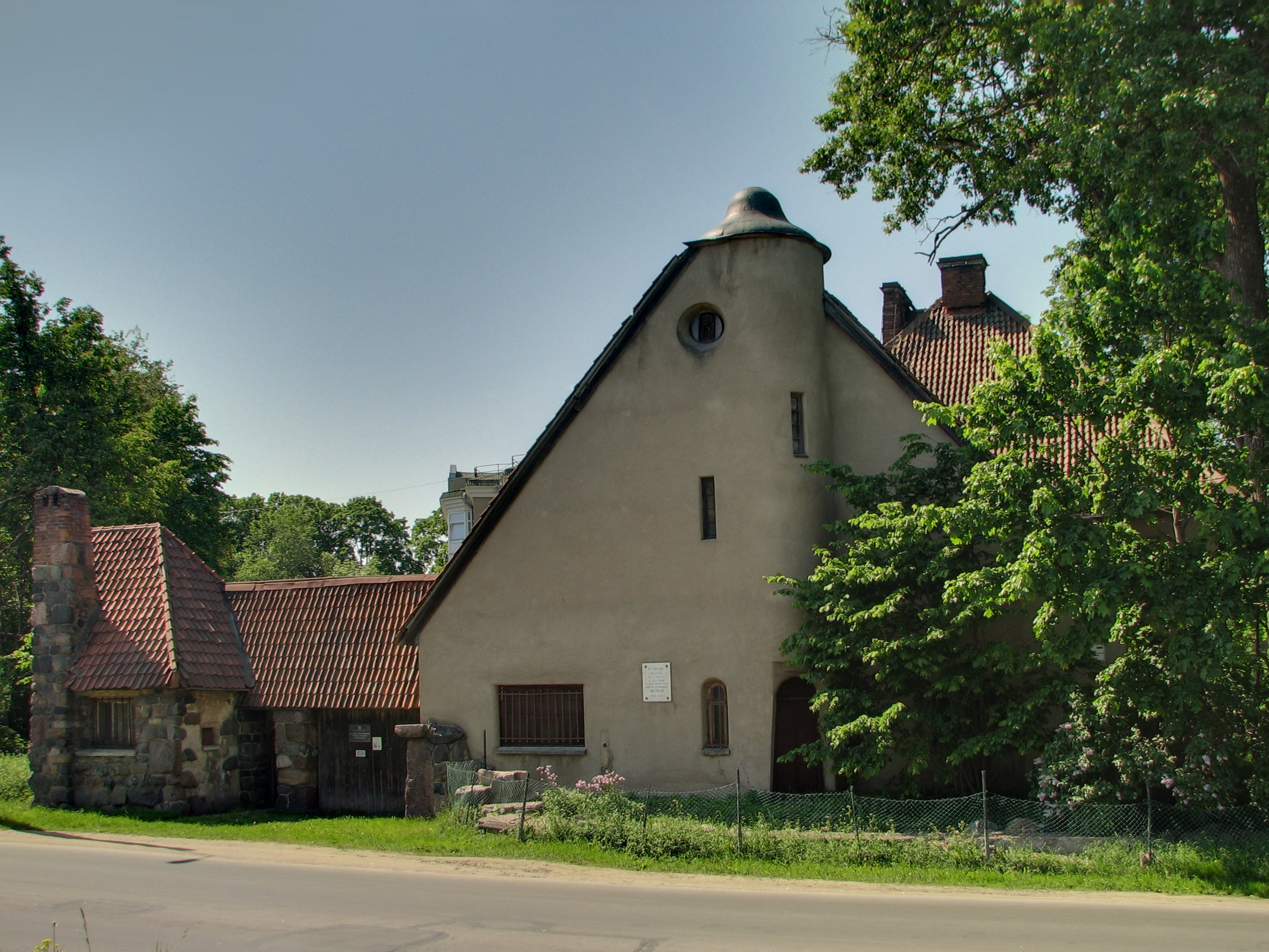
Shcherbov Estate Museum

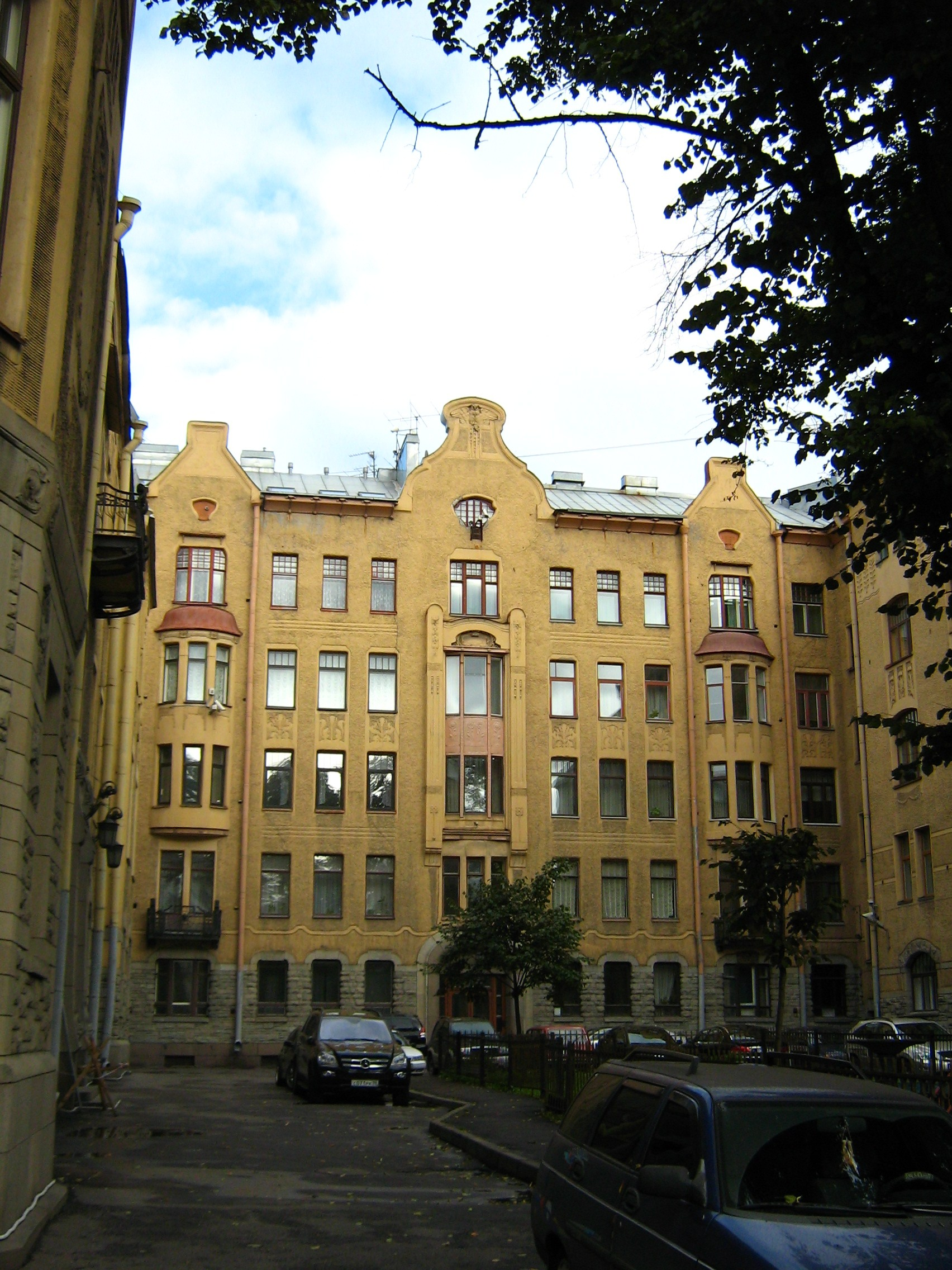
Lidval house

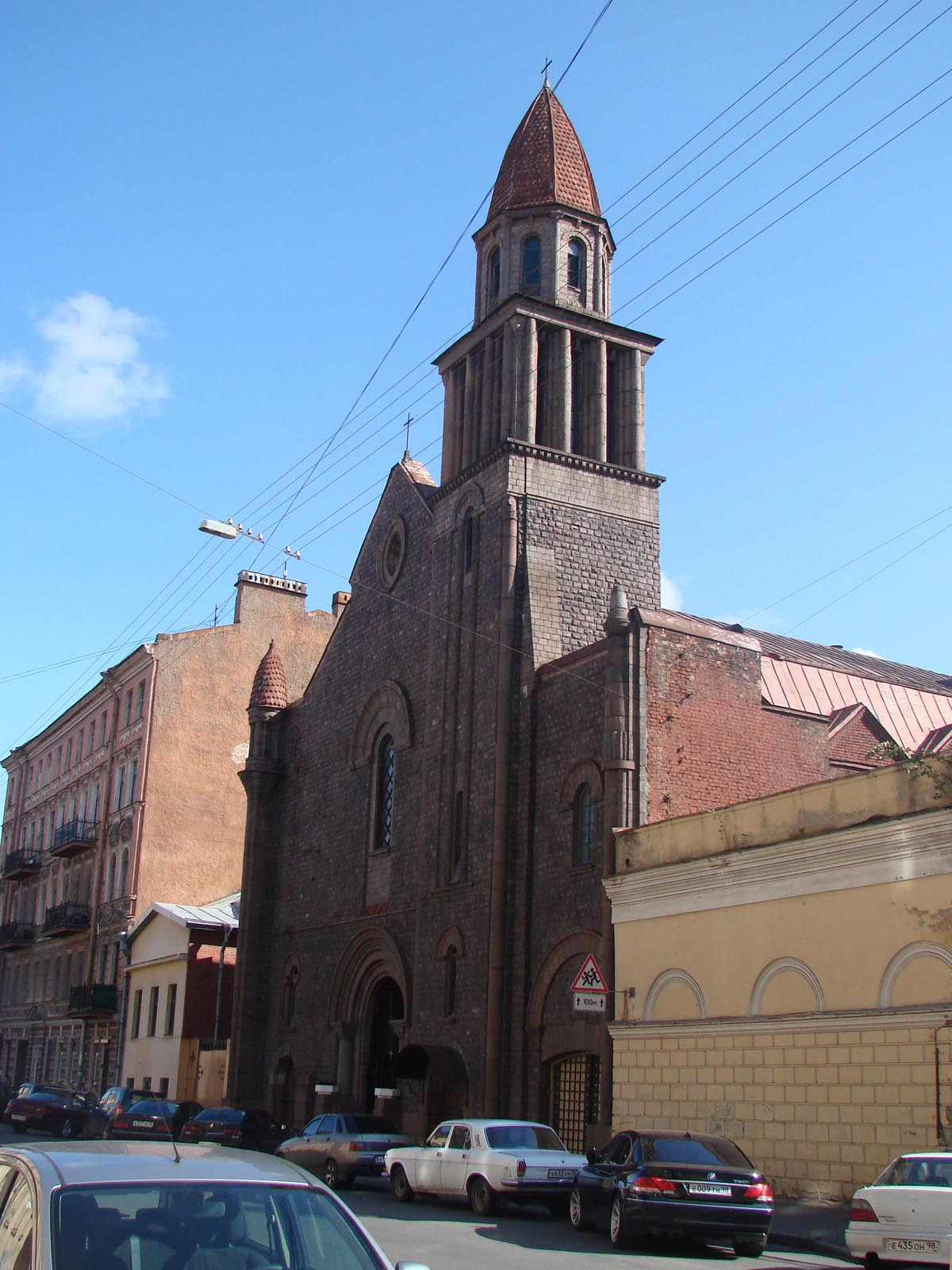
Shrine of Our Lady of Lourdes

== See also ==
- List of architectural styles
