= Helme Parish =

Former municipality of Estonia

Coordinates: 58°0′10″N 25°55′25″E

Helme Parish Helme vald
- Municipality of Estonia
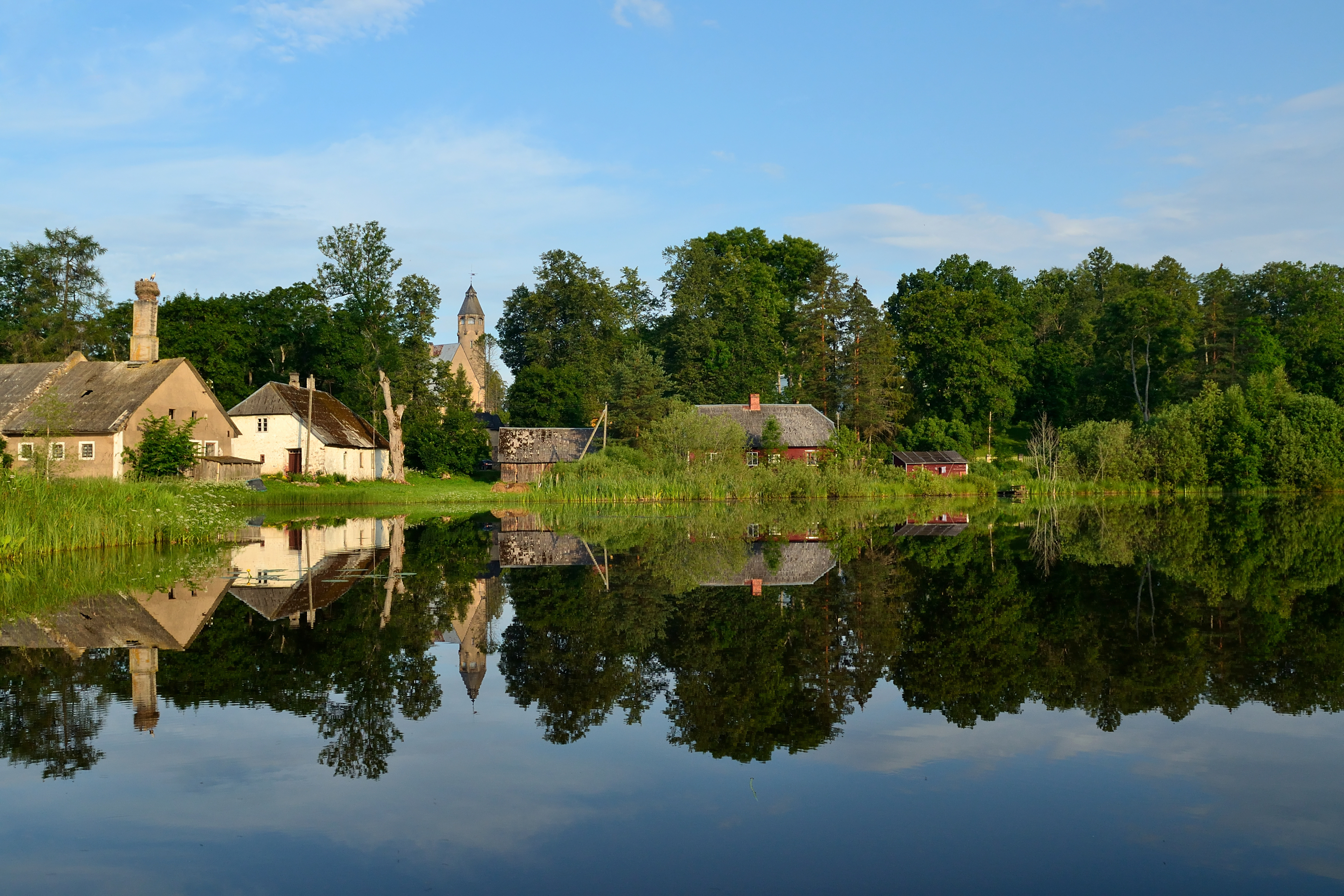
- Taagepera lake on the Õhne river

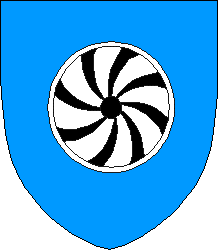
- Flag Coat of arms

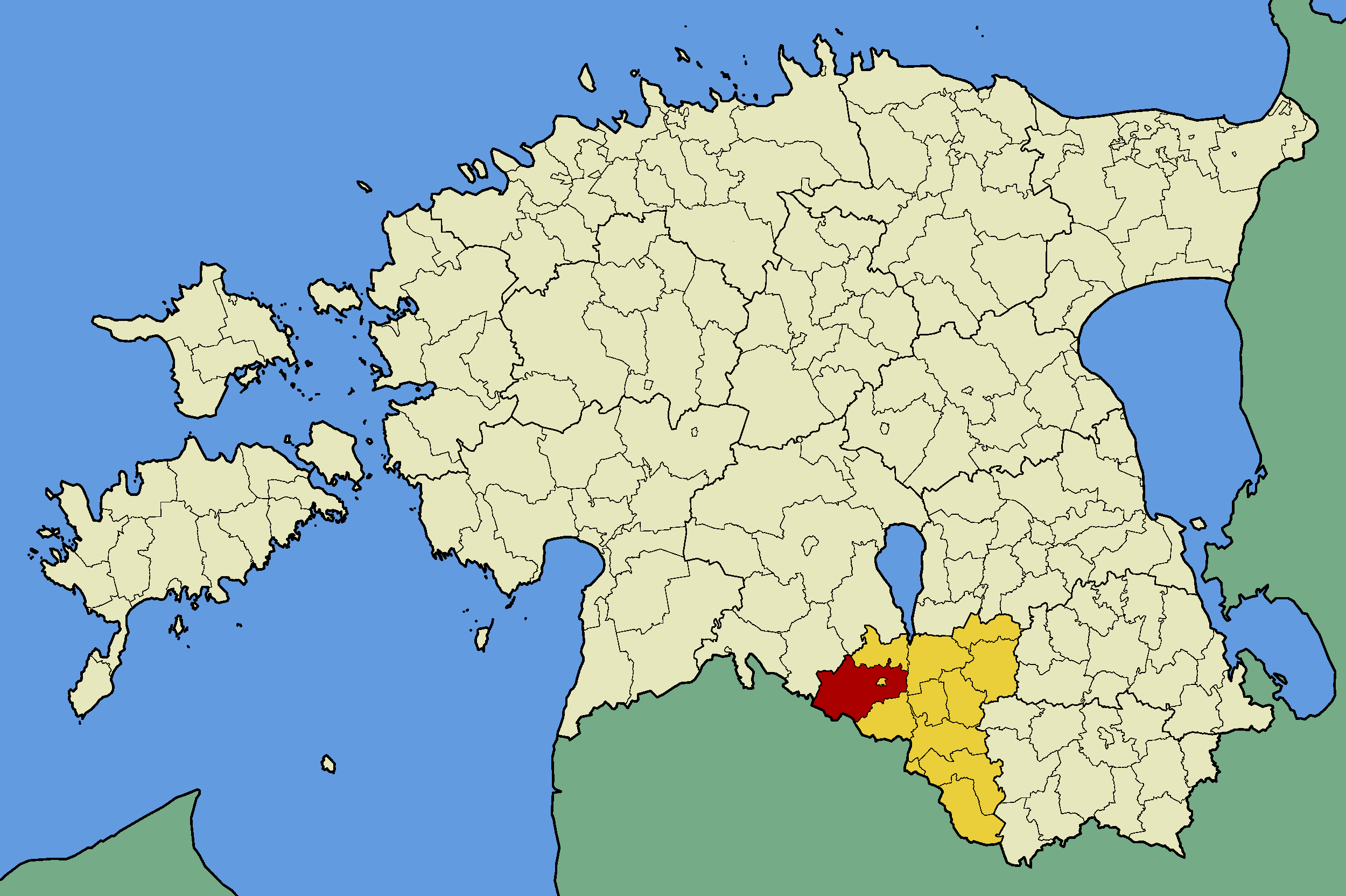
- Helme Parish within Valga County.
- Country: Estonia
- County: Valga County
- Administrative centre: Tõrva

Government
  - elder (Estonian: vallavanem): Tarmo Tamm (Sotsiaaldemokraatlik Erakond)

Area
  - Total: 312.73 km^{2} (120.75 sq mi)

Population (01.01.2009)
  - Total: 2,525
  - Density: 8.074/km^{2} (20.91/sq mi)
- Website: www.helme.ee

Helme Parish (Estonian: Helme vald) was a rural municipality of Estonia, in Valga County. It had a population of 2,525 (as of 1 January 2009) and an area of 312.73 km^{2}.

== Geography ==
=== Populated places ===
There was small borough (Estonian: alevik) Helme and 14 villages (Estonian: küla) in Helme Parish. The villages were: Ala, Holdre, Jõgeveste, Kähu, Kalme, Karjatnurme, Kirikuküla, Koorküla, Linna, Möldre, Patküla, Pilpa, Roobe and Taagepera.

== Gallery ==
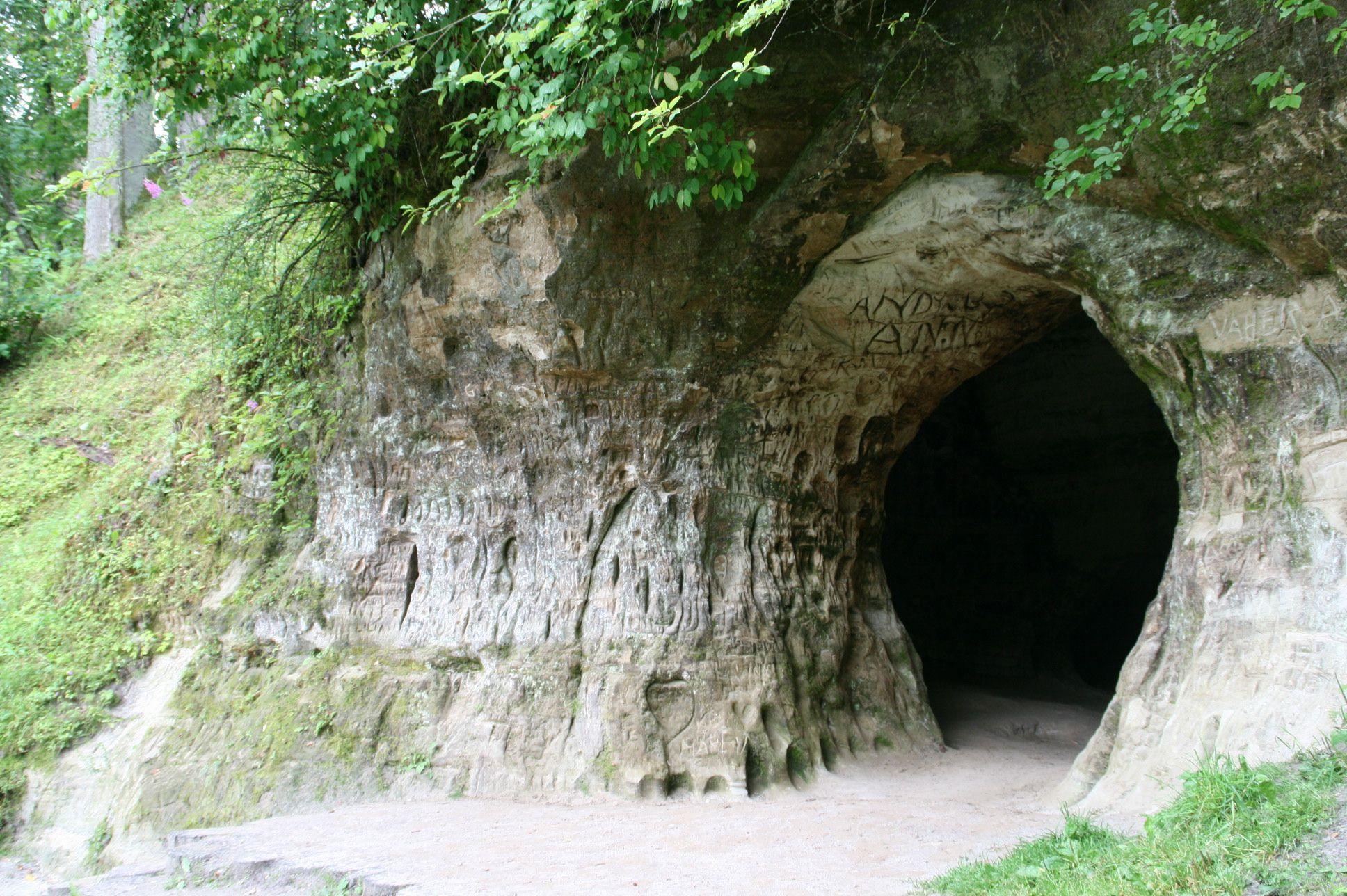
Helme caves

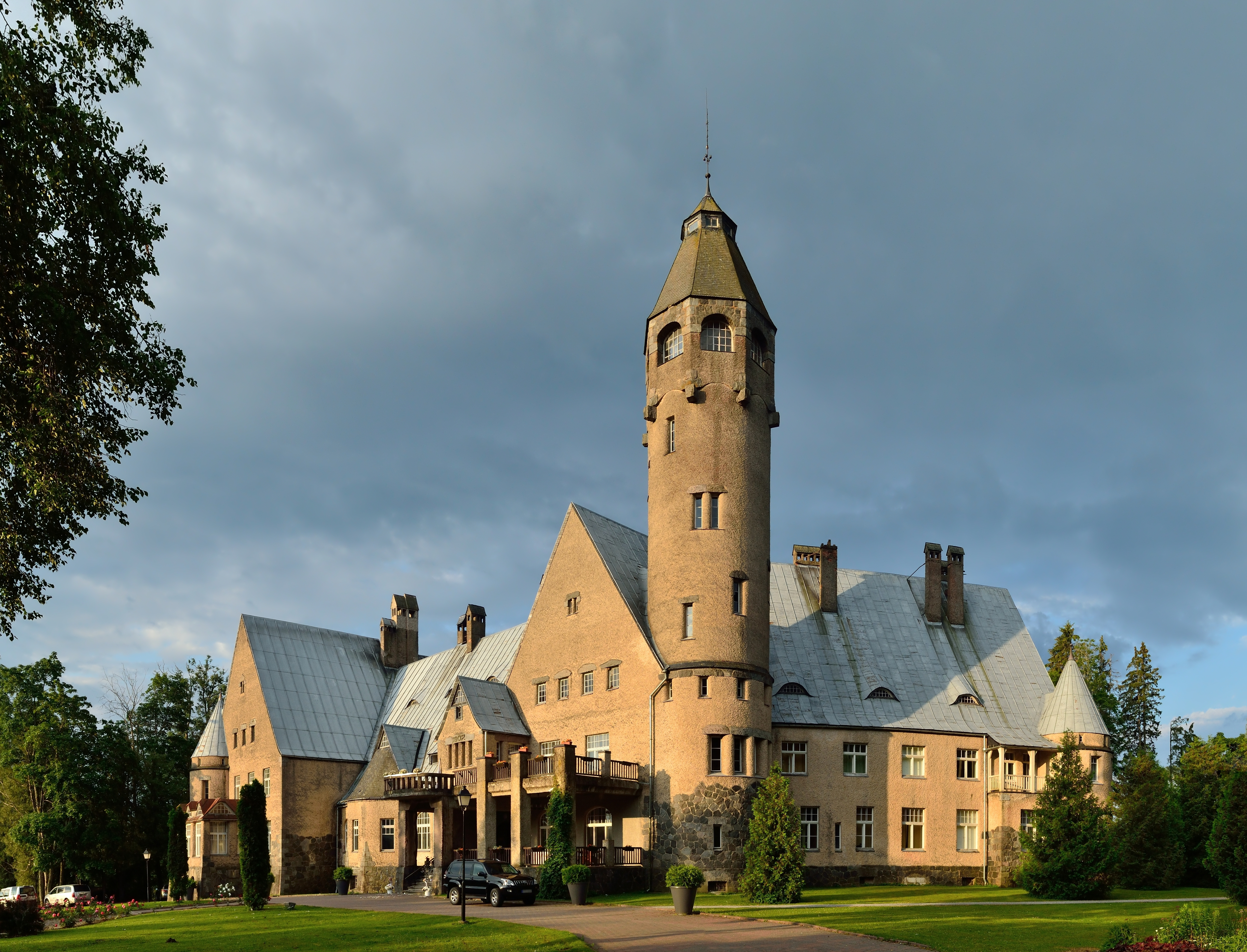
Taagepera Castle

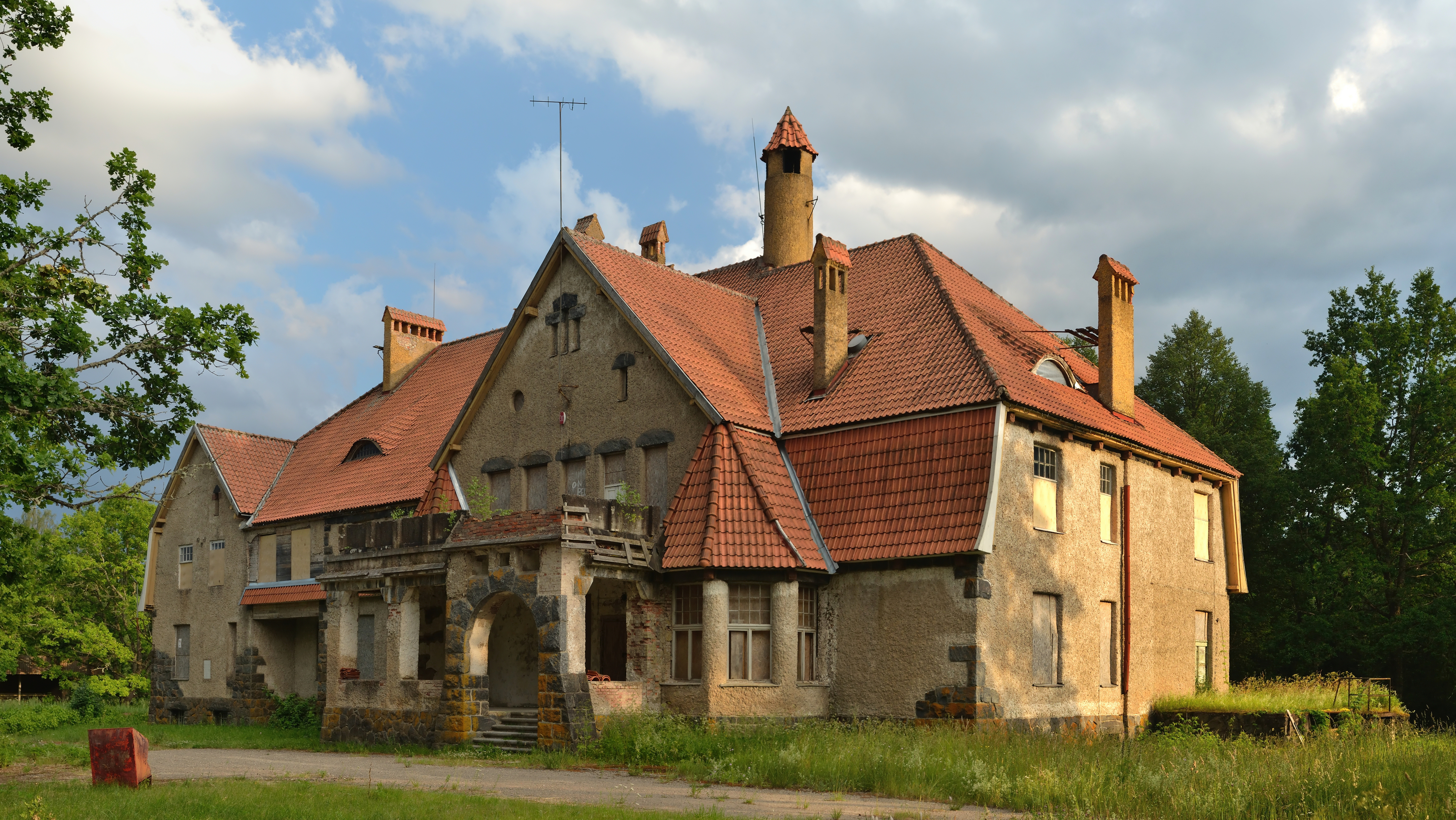
Holdre manor

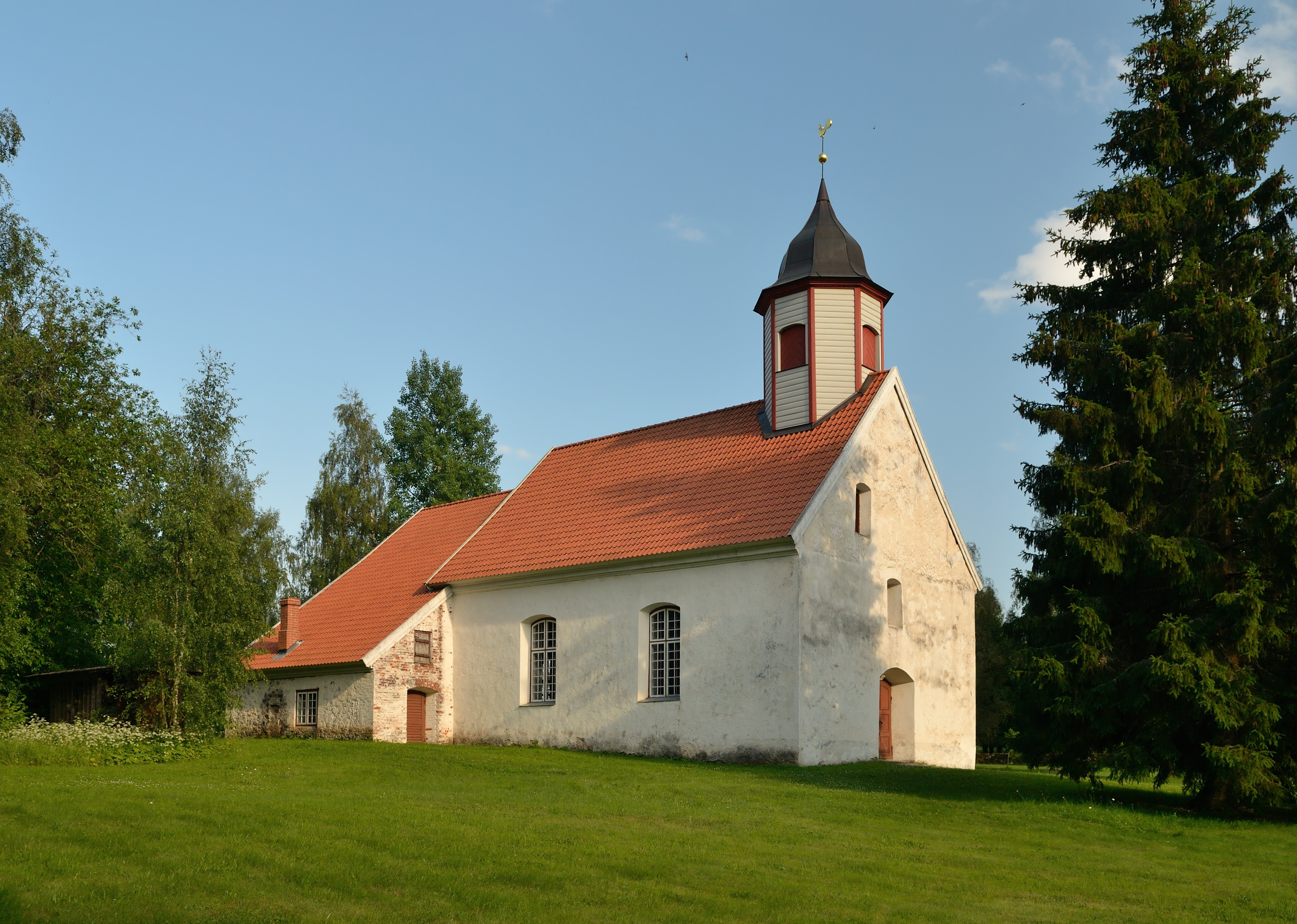
Taagepera Church

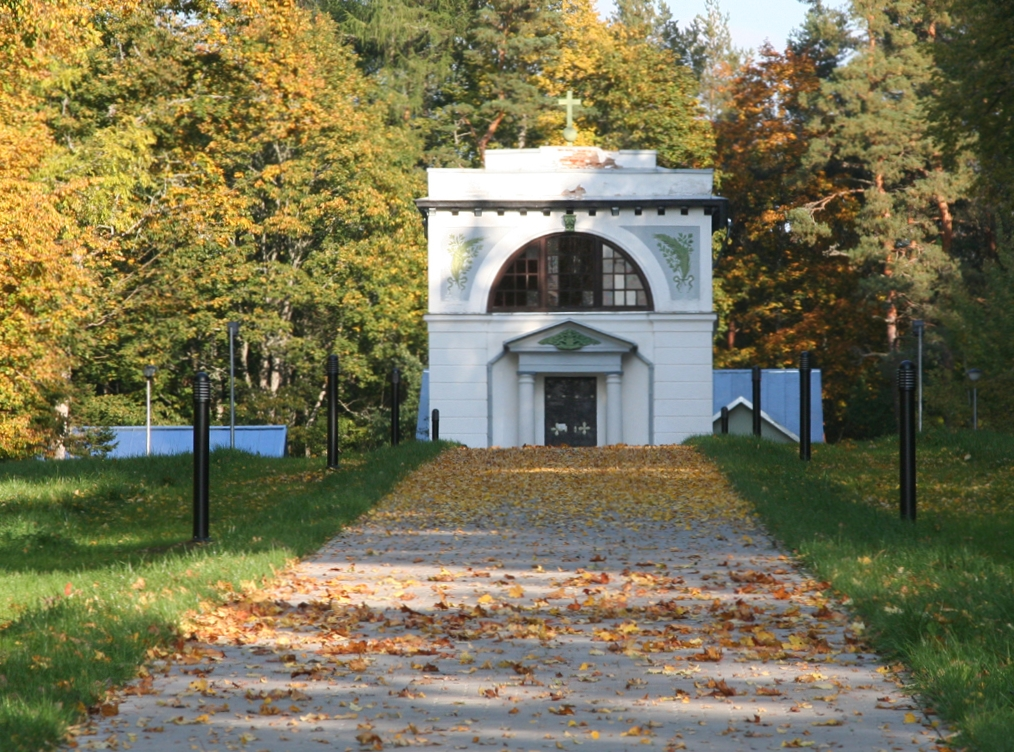
Barclay de Tolly mausoleum in Jõgeveste
