= Põdrala Parish =

Former municipality of Estonia

Coordinates: 58°05′48″N 25°53′51″E

Põdrala Parish Põdrala vald
- Municipality of Estonia
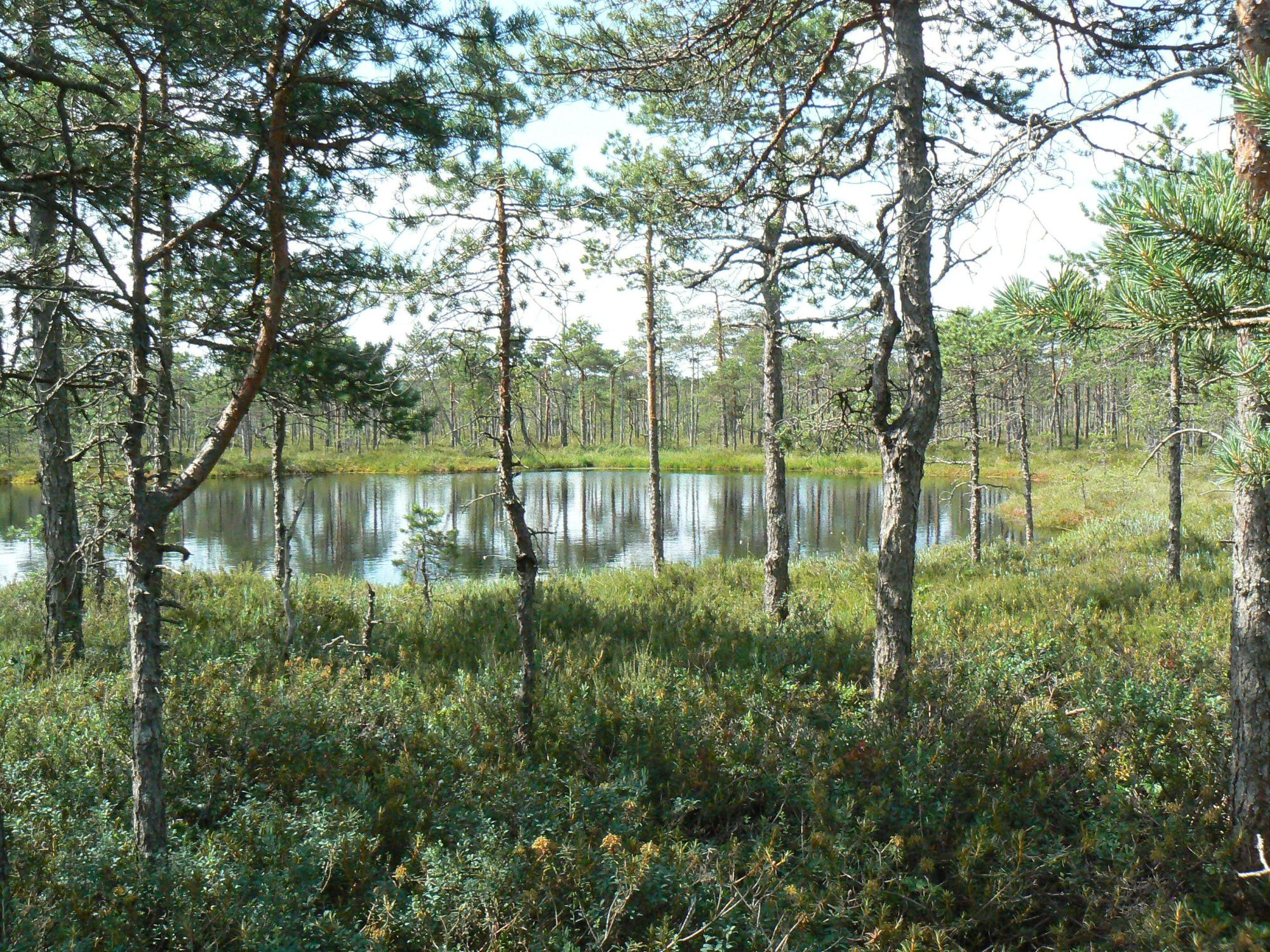
- Rubina bog

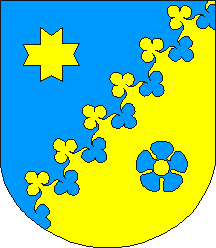
- Flag Coat of arms

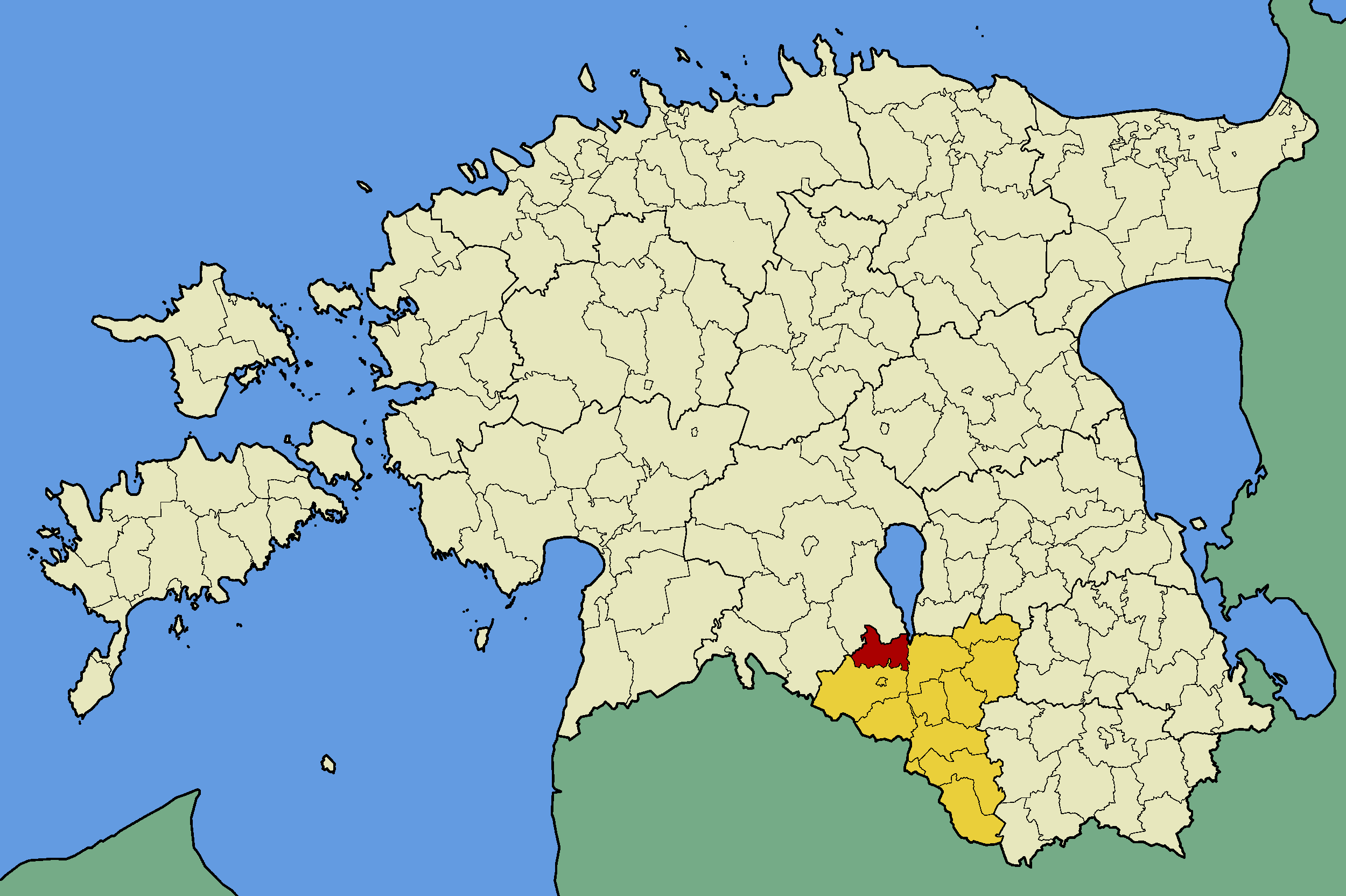
- Põdrala Parish within Valga County.
- Country: Estonia
- County: Valga County
- Administrative centre: Riidaja

Area
  - Total: 127.2 km^{2} (49.1 sq mi)

Population (01.01.2012)
  - Total: 854
  - Density: 6.71/km^{2} (17.4/sq mi)
- Website: www.podrala.ee

Põdrala Parish was a rural municipality of the Estonian county of Valga.

== Settlements ==
Villages

Karu - Kaubi - Kungi - Leebiku - Liva - Lõve - Pikasilla - Pori - Reti - Riidaja - Rulli - Uralaane - Vanamõisa - Voorbahi
