= Hummuli Parish =

Former municipality of Estonia

Coordinates: 57°54′13″N 26°03′30″E

Hummuli Parish Hummuli vald
- Municipality of Estonia
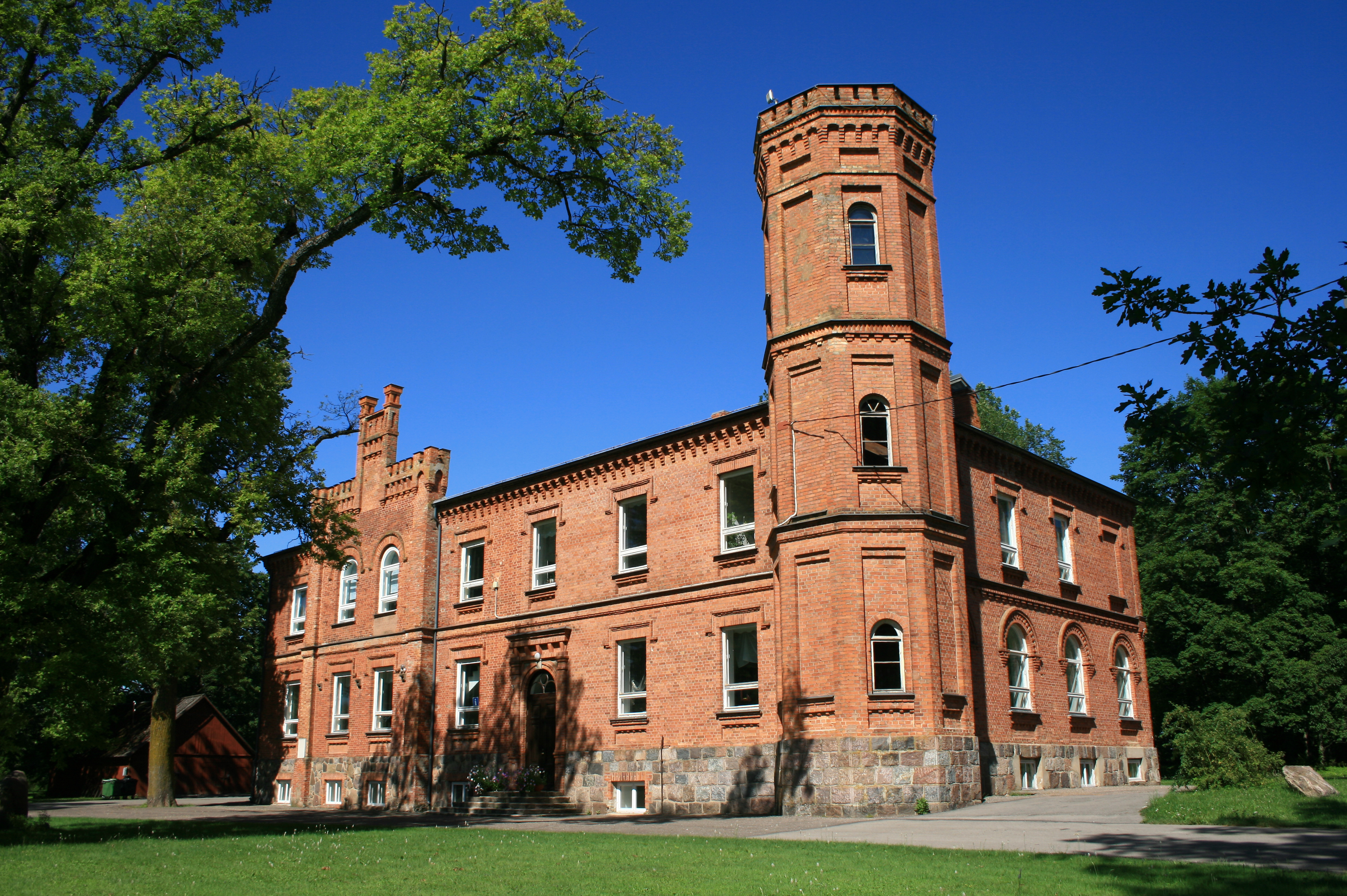
- Hummuli manor

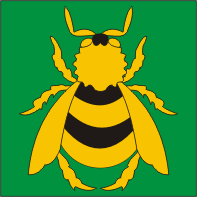
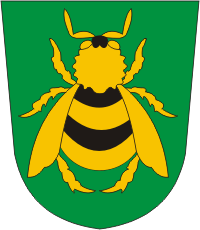
- Flag Coat of arms

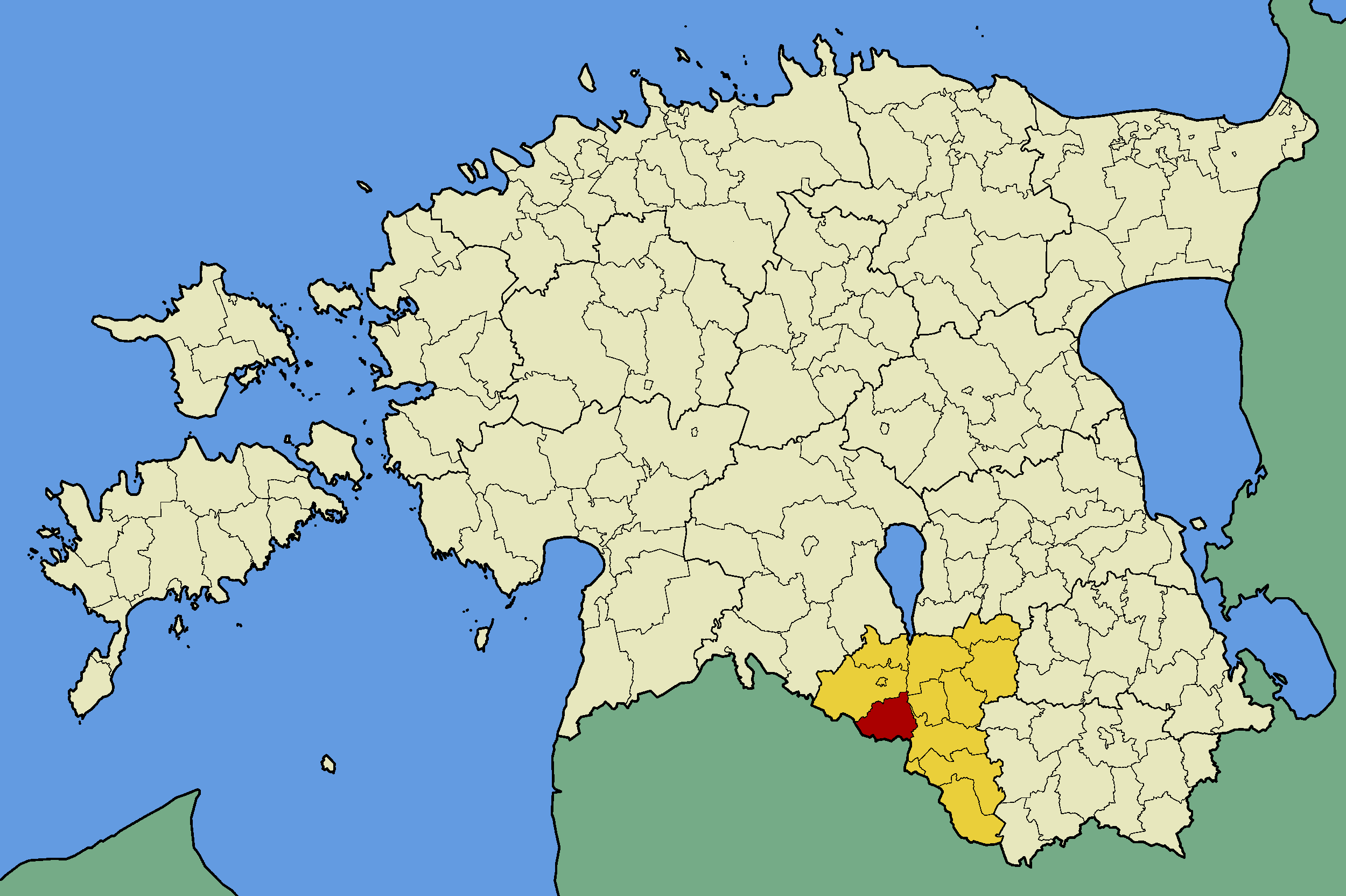
- Hummuli Parish within Valga County.
- Country: Estonia
- County: Valga County
- Administrative centre: Hummuli

Government
  - Vallavanem: Enn Mihhailov

Area
  - Total: 162.7 km^{2} (62.8 sq mi)

Population (01.01.2006)
  - Total: 1,060
  - Density: 6.52/km^{2} (16.9/sq mi)
- Website: www.hummulivv.ee

Hummuli Parish was a rural municipality of the Estonian county of Valga.

== Settlements ==
Small borough

Hummuli

Villages

Aitsra - Alamõisa - Jeti - Kulli - Piiri - Puide - Ransi - Soe
