= Johannes Märtson =

Estonian politician (1868–1935)

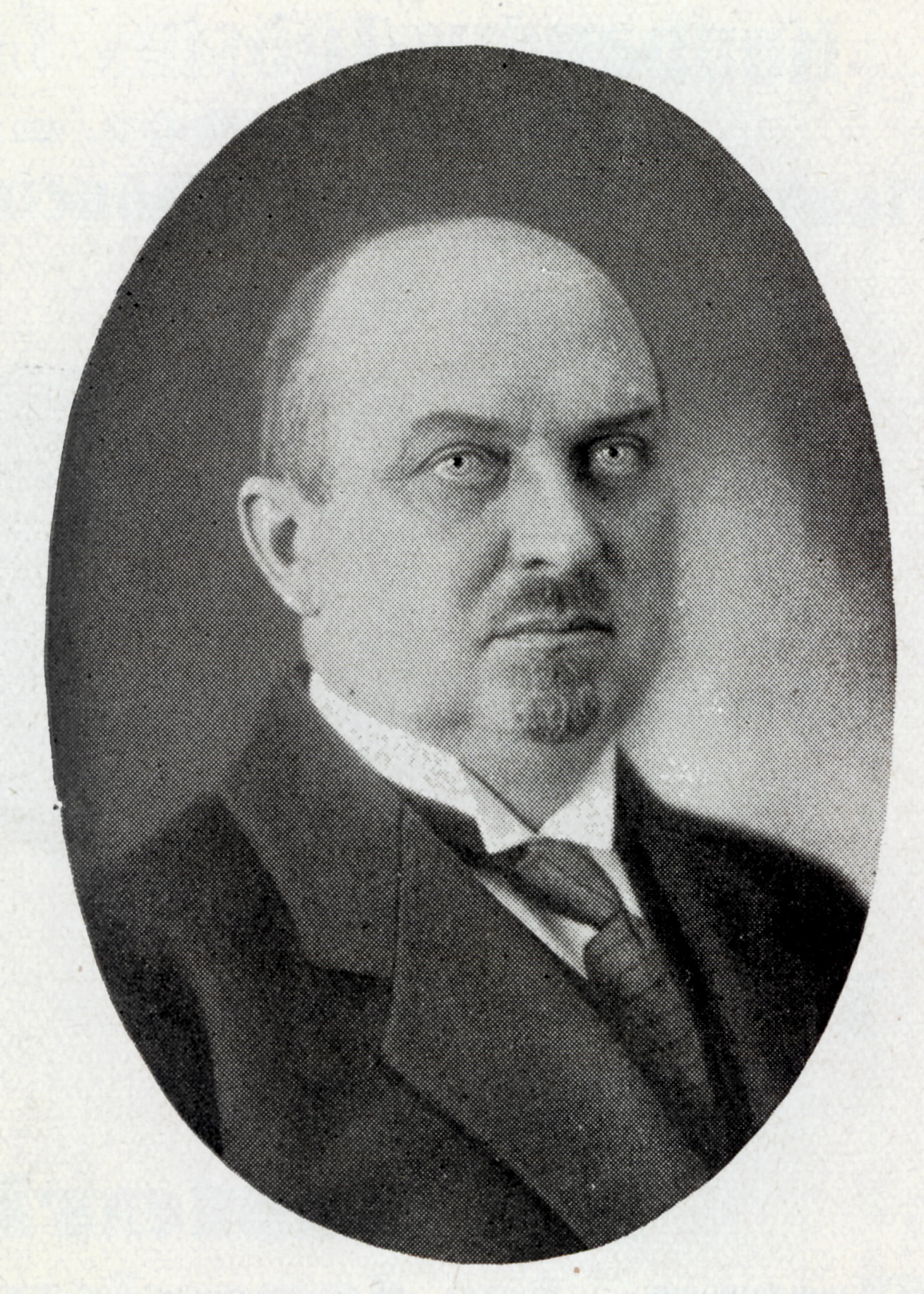
Johannes Märtson

Johannes Märtson (25 August 1868 Lõve Parish (now Tõrva Parish), Kreis Fellin – 9 January 1935 Tõrva) was an Estonian politician. He was a member of I Riigikogu. He was a member of the Riigikogu since 11 February 1921. He replaced Hugo Rahamägi.
