= Soontaga Nature Reserve =

Protected area in Estonia

- Location within Estonia
- Location: Estonia
- Coordinates: 58°02′N 26°06′E
- Area: 1,225 hectares (3,030 acres)
- Established: 2006

Soontaga Nature Reserve is a nature reserve which is located in Valga County, Estonia.

The area of the nature reserve is 1,225 hectares (3,030 acres).

The protected area was founded in 2006 to protect valuable habitat types and threatened species in Soontaga village (former Puka Parish).
