= Valgjärv (Jeti) =

Lake in Valga County, Estonia

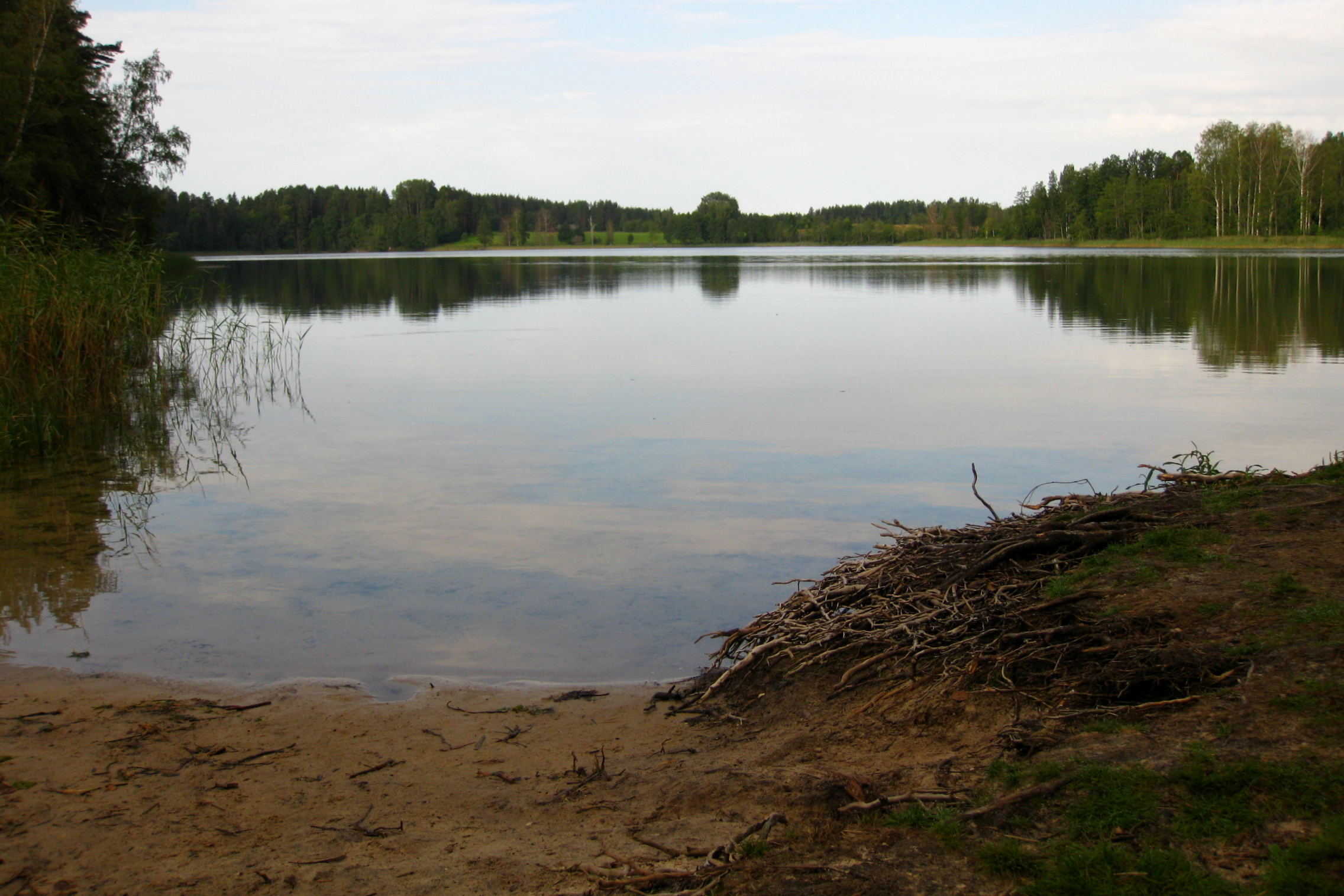

- Location within Estonia
- Location: Tõrva Parish, Valga County, Estonia
- Coordinates: 57.9°N 25.87°E
- Basin countries: Estonia
- Max. length: 1,190 meters (3,900 ft)
- Surface area: 44.3 hectares (109 acres)
- Average depth: 8.5 meters (28 ft)
- Max. depth: 26.8 meters (88 ft)
- Shore length^{1}: 3,660 meters (12,010 ft)
- Surface elevation: 70.5 meters (231 ft)
- ^{1} Shore length is not a well-defined measure.

Valgjärv (also Koorküla Valgjärv) is a lake in Estonia. It is located in the village of Jeti in Tõrva Parish, Valga County. The lake is one of the deepest in Estonia.

== Physical description ==
The lake has an area of 44.3 hectares (109 acres). The lake has an average depth of 8.5 meters (28 ft) and a maximum depth of 26.8 meters (88 ft). It is 1,190 meters (3,900 ft) long, and its shoreline measures 3,660 meters (12,010 ft).

== Names ==
The name Valgjärv (lit. 'white lake') is a common designation for lakes in Estonia (compare also the similar Finnish hydronym Valkeajärvi). The naming motivation is considered to be clear water with a shallow light sandy bottom in some areas of the lake. Some lakes named Valgjärv may also have been named to contrast with neighboring lakes called Mustjärv (lit. 'black lake'). The variant name Koorküla Valgjärv, referring to the village of Koorküla immediately to the northwest, disinguishes the lake from other Estonian lakes named Valgjärv.

== History ==
The inhabitants of the region have long known that there are manor buildings in the lake. An oral tradition, written down in the 17th century, told of a manor lord that wanted to marry his sister. The wedding was held in the manor against the permission of the local priest. During the wedding, it started to rain, and in the morning a lake was noticed at the site of the manor. Diving studies were carried out in the lake as early as 1640, and it was found that the information was at least partially correct. At a depth of about two meters, wooden structures can still be found, which were documented in 1958 in research by the archaeologist Jüri Selirand. At that time, divers found the remains of dwellings built on piles in the middle of the lake. The piles had been erected on the crest of a ridge running along the bottom of the lake. The pieces of wood were then dated to the second half of the first millennium (i.e., between AD 500 and 1000). The dating was also confirmed by artefacts. Investigations were completed in the 1980s and early 1990s, and they resulted in the discovery of the remains of a bridge built on piles.

== See also ==
- List of lakes of Estonia
