= Reti, Estonia =

Village in Estonia

Reti
- village
- Location in Estonia
- Coordinates: 58°07′06″N 25°53′04″E
- Country: Estonia
- County: Valga County
- Municipality: Tõrva Parish

Population (2021)
  - Total: 48

Reti is a village in Tõrva Parish, Valga County, in southern Estonia. It had a population of 62 in 2011, and 48 in 2021.

Reti was part of Põdrala Parish until 2017.

== History ==
Reti village was established in 1977, comprising the territory of the former villages of Suurküla, Väikeküla, Loime, and Rilli. The village was named after Reti farm in Suurküla, in turn deriving from the name Rett, a shortened form of Konrad.

The settlement of Murikatsi, which was considered a separate village as of the 1930s and later a part of Rilli, now comprises the western part of Reti. Murikatsi manor (German: Murrikatz) was built in the 17th century. The manor was also known in Estonian as Tinkoli manor, after the surname of its original owner, Benedict Steinkuhl. From 1792 onward, Murikatsi manor and Kärstna manor were under joint ownership.

The surname of musician Arvo Pärt derives from the Pärt farm in Murikatsi, which is within present-day Reti village.
