= Aitsra =

Village in Estonia

Coordinates: 57°54′05″N 25°55′48″E

- Village
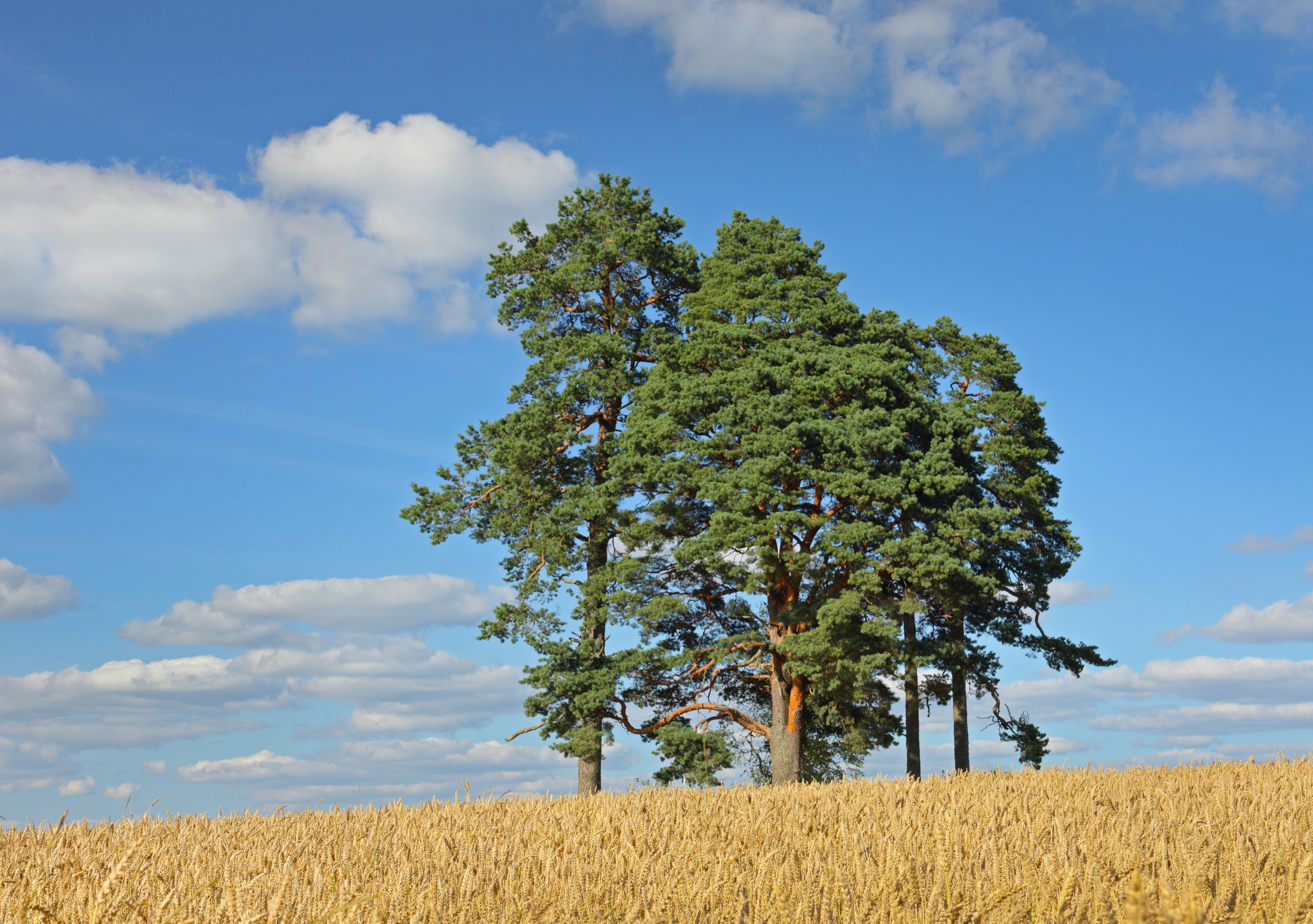

- Location within Estonia
- Country: Estonia
- County: Valga County
- Parish: Tõrva Parish

Population (2019)
  - Total: 14
- Time zone: UTC+2 (EET)
  - Summer (DST): UTC+3 (EEST)

Aitsra is a village in Tõrva Parish, Valga County in Estonia.
