= Uralaane =

Village in Estonia

- village
- Location in Estonia
- Coordinates: 58°04′17″N 25°58′41″E
- Country: Estonia
- County: Valga County
- Municipality: Tõrva Parish

Population (01.01.2012)
  - Total: 36

Uralaane is a village in Tõrva Parish, Valga County, in southern Estonia. It has a population of 36 (as of 1 January 2012).
