= Tõrva Parish =

Municipality of Estonia

Tõrva Parish Tõrva vald
- Municipality of Estonia
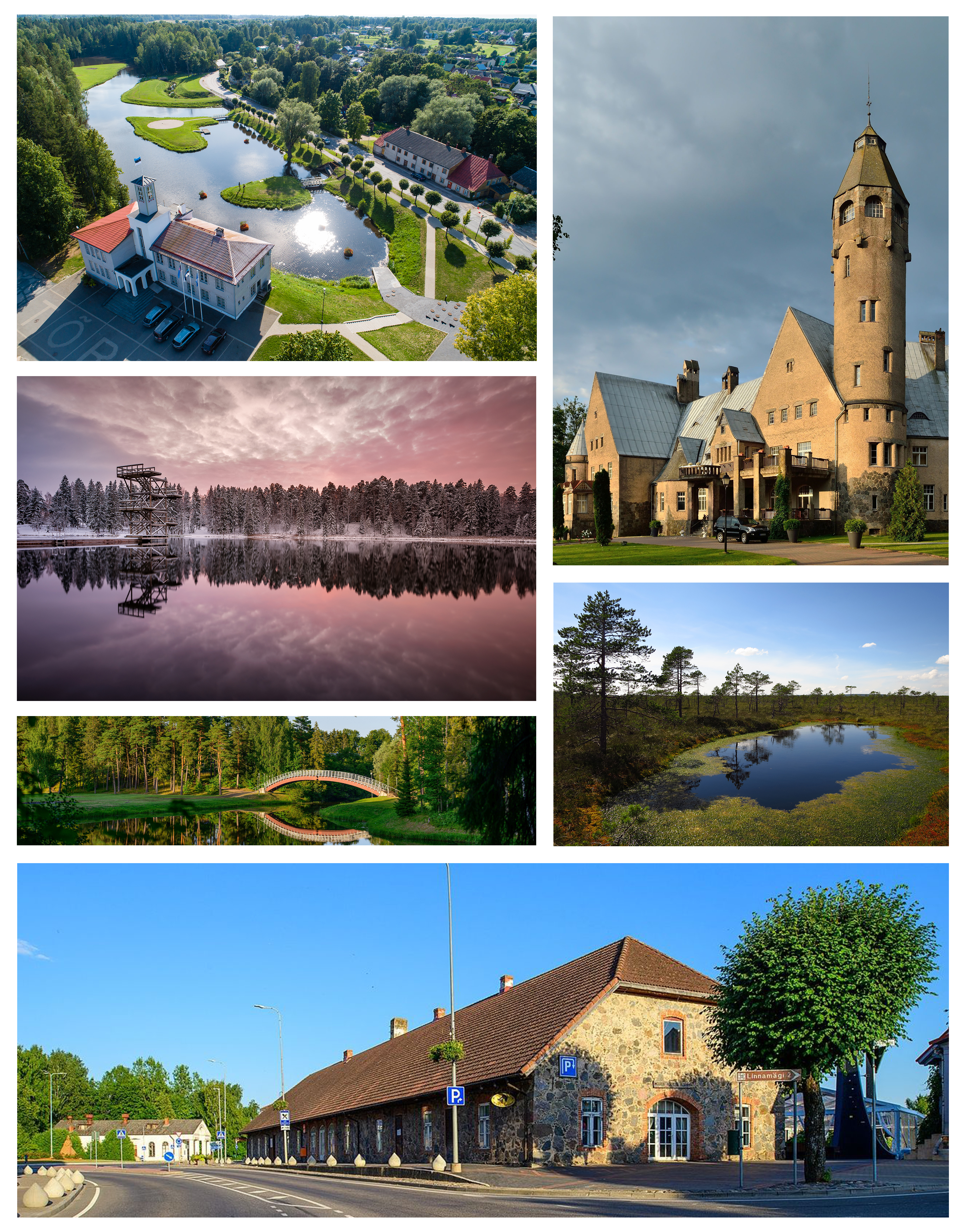

- Flag Coat of arms

- Tõrva Parish within Valga County.
- Country: Estonia
- County: Valga County
- Administrative centre: Tõrva

Government
  - Mayor: Helen Elias (Estonian Reform Party)

Area
  - Total: 647 km^{2} (250 sq mi)

Population (01.01.2019)
  - Total: 6,129
  - Density: 9.47/km^{2} (24.5/sq mi)
- ISO 3166 code: EE-824
- Website: Official website

Tõrva Parish (Estonian: Tõrva vald) is a rural municipality in Valga County. It includes the town of Tõrva.

== Settlements ==
Town

Tõrva

Boroughs

Helme, Hummuli

Villages

Aitsra, Ala, Alamõisa, Holdre, Jeti, Jõgeveste, Kalme, Karjatnurme, Karu, Kaubi, Kirikuküla, Koorküla, Kulli, Kungi, Kähu, Leebiku, Linna, Liva, Lõve, Möldre, Patküla, Piiri, Pikasilla, Pilpa, Pori, Puide Ransi, Reti, Riidaja, Roobe, Rulli, Soe, Soontaga, Taagepera, Uralaane, Vanamõisa, Voorbahi

== Religion ==
The most common religions in the parish are Lutheranism and Orthodoxy, although most of the municipality's adult residents are unaffiliated.

== Notable people ==
- Paul Andreas von Rennenkampff (1790 in Helme – 1857), was a Baltic German nobleman, military commander and Statesman
- Aleksander Läte (1860 in Pikasilla – 1948), composer, conductor and music critic.
- Johan Kõpp (1874 in Holdre – 1970), bishop and head of the Estonian Evangelical Lutheran Church, 1939–1944.
- Paul Lill (1882 in Roobe – 1942), military officer and Minister of War, from 1933 to 1939
- Hella Wuolijoki (1886 in Ala – 1954), Finnish writer, playwright, parliamentarian, farmer and dramatist.
- Salme Pekkala-Dutt (1888 Taagepera – 1964), an Estonian-British communist politician, essayist, writer and admirer of Stalin
- Aleksander Jaakson (1892 in Holdre – 1942), army general, educator and politician; Minister of Education, 1936 to 1939
- sisters from Riidaja, Karin Luts (1904–1993) a painter and graphic artist & Meta Luts (1905–1958), an actress.
- Endel Aruja (1911 in Soontaga – 2008), physicist specialising in X-ray crystallography
- Jaak Aab (born 1960 in Taagepera), politician, Minister of Education and Research three times
