= Liva, Estonia =

Village in Estonia

Liva
- village
- Location in Estonia
- Coordinates: 58°02′22″N 26°02′10″E
- Country: Estonia
- County: Valga County
- Municipality: Tõrva Parish

Population (01.01.2012)
  - Total: 19

Liva is a village in Tõrva Parish, Valga County, in southern Estonia. It has a population of 19 (as of 1 January 2012).
