= Soontaga =

Village in Estonia

- Village
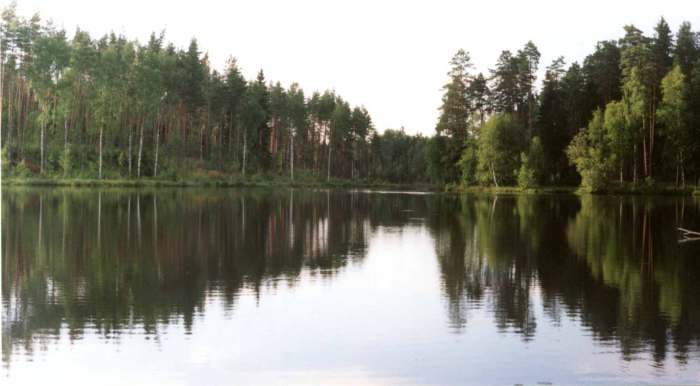
- Lake Rooni in Soontaga

- Location in Estonia
- Coordinates: 58.006944444444°N 26.087777777778°E
- Country: Estonia
- County: Valga County
- Parish: Tõrva Parish
- Time zone: UTC+2 (EET)
  - Summer (DST): UTC+3 (EEST)

Soontaga is a village in Tõrva Parish, Valga County in Estonia.
