= Jõgeveste =

Village in Estonia

- Village
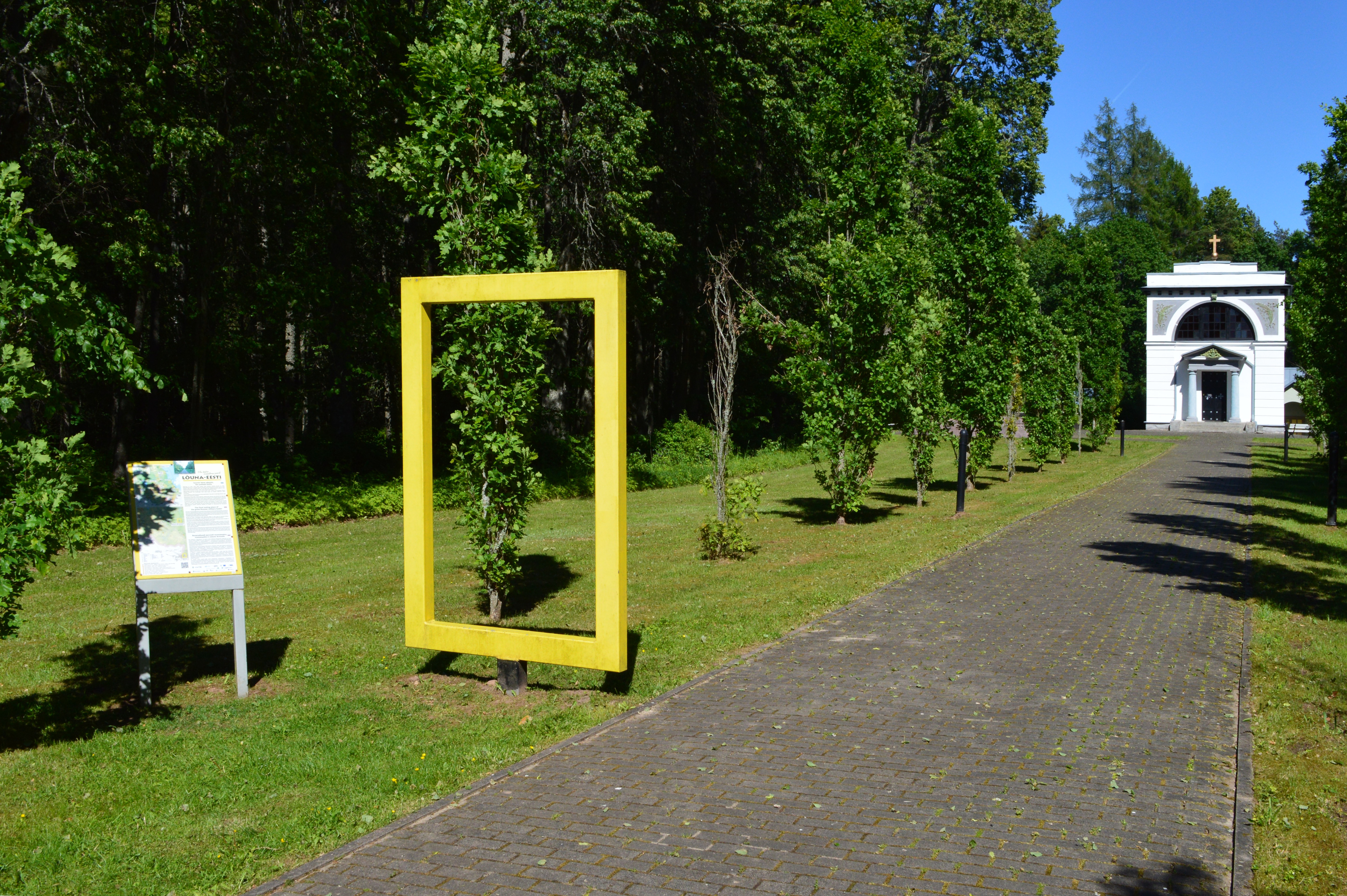
- Barclay de Tolly mausoleum in Jõgeveste manor cemetery

- Location within Estonia
- Coordinates: 57.998611111111°N 26.032222222222°E
- Country: Estonia
- County: Valga County
- Parish: Tõrva Parish
- Time zone: UTC+2 (EET)
  - Summer (DST): UTC+3 (EEST)

Jõgeveste (German: Beckhof) is a village in Tõrva Parish, Valga County in Estonia.
