= Rulli =

Village in Estonia

- village
- Location in Estonia
- Coordinates: 58°02′34″N 25°58′31″E
- Country: Estonia
- County: Valga County
- Municipality: Tõrva Parish

Population (01.01.2016)
  - Total: 33

Rulli is a village in Tõrva Parish, Valga County, in southern Estonia. It has a population of 33 (as of 1 January 2016).
