= Soe, Valga County =

Village in Estonia

- Village
- Location within Estonia
- Coordinates: 57.910833333333°N 26.046388888889°E
- Country: Estonia
- County: Valga County
- Parish: Tõrva Parish
- Time zone: UTC+2 (EET)
  - Summer (DST): UTC+3 (EEST)

Soe is a village in Tõrva Parish, Valga County in Estonia.
