= Vanamõisa, Valga County =

Village in Estonia

Vanamõisa
- village
- Location in Estonia
- Coordinates: 58°03′20″N 25°55′21″E
- Country: Estonia
- County: Valga County
- Municipality: Tõrva Parish

Population (01.01.2012)
  - Total: 25

Vanamõisa (German: Althof) is a village in Tõrva Parish, Valga County, in southern Estonia. It has a population of 25 (as of 1 January 2012).
