= Hummuli =

Borough in Estonia

- Small borough
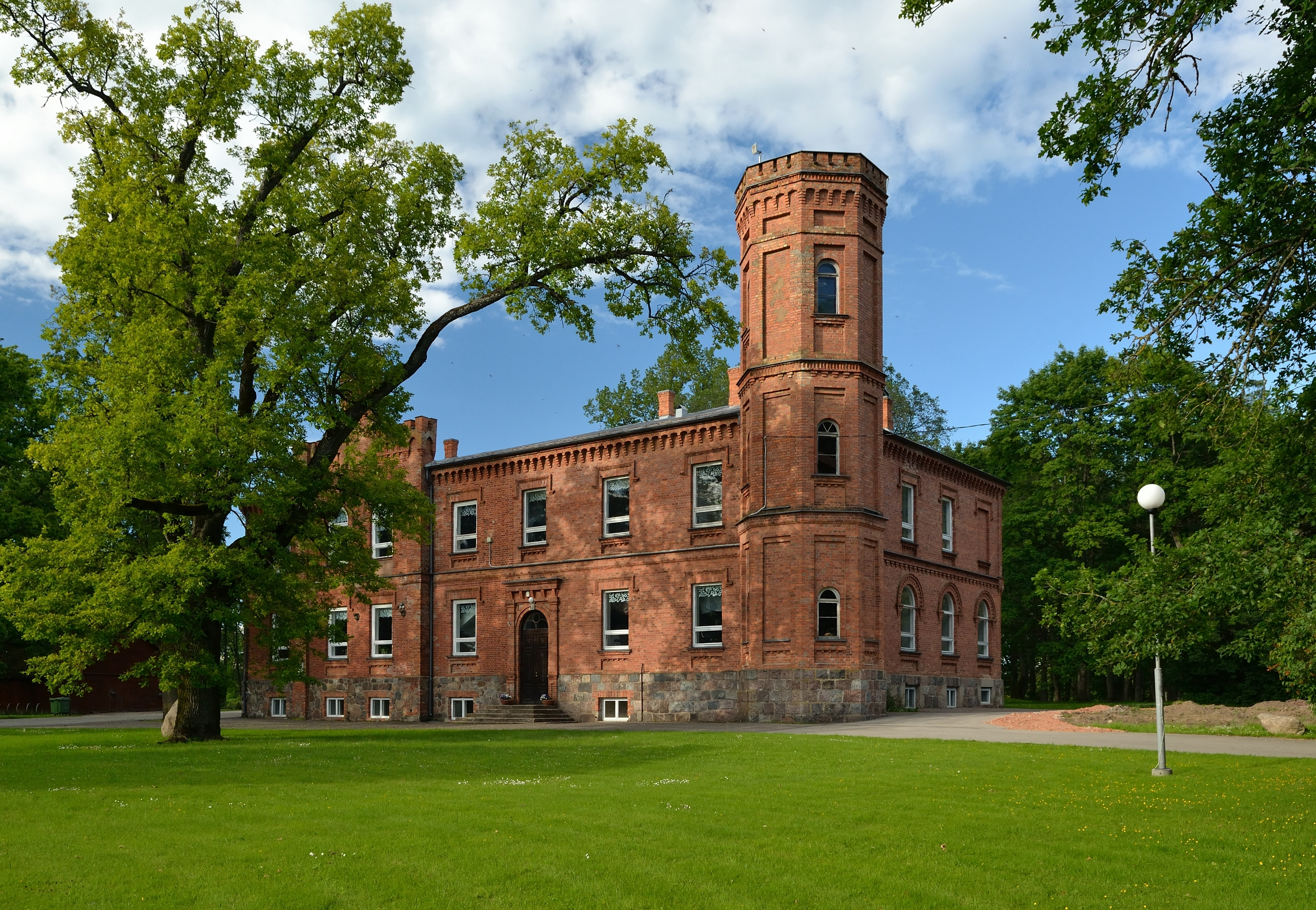
- Hummuli manor main building, today a school

- Location in Estonia
- Coordinates: 57°54′23″N 26°03′11″E
- Country: Estonia
- County: Valga County
- Municipality: Hummuli Parish

Population (01.01.2010)
  - Total: 379

Hummuli (German: Hummelshof) is a small borough (Estonian: alevik) in Valga County, in southern Estonia. It was the administrative centre of Hummuli Parish. Hummuli has a population of 379 (as of 1 January 2010). In 1702 the Battle of Hummelshof, part of the Great Northern War, took place near Hummuli.

== Hummuli manor ==
Hummuli manor has a history that goes back to at least 1470. The present-day building however dates from the 1860s, when the manor belonged to the local aristocrats von Samson-Himmelstjerna, who were the owners of the estate right up until 1914. Today the manor houses a school, and although a few interior details remain, the interior layout of the neo-Gothic building has changed drastically. In 1919 a battle of the Estonian War of Independence took place near Hummuli manor.

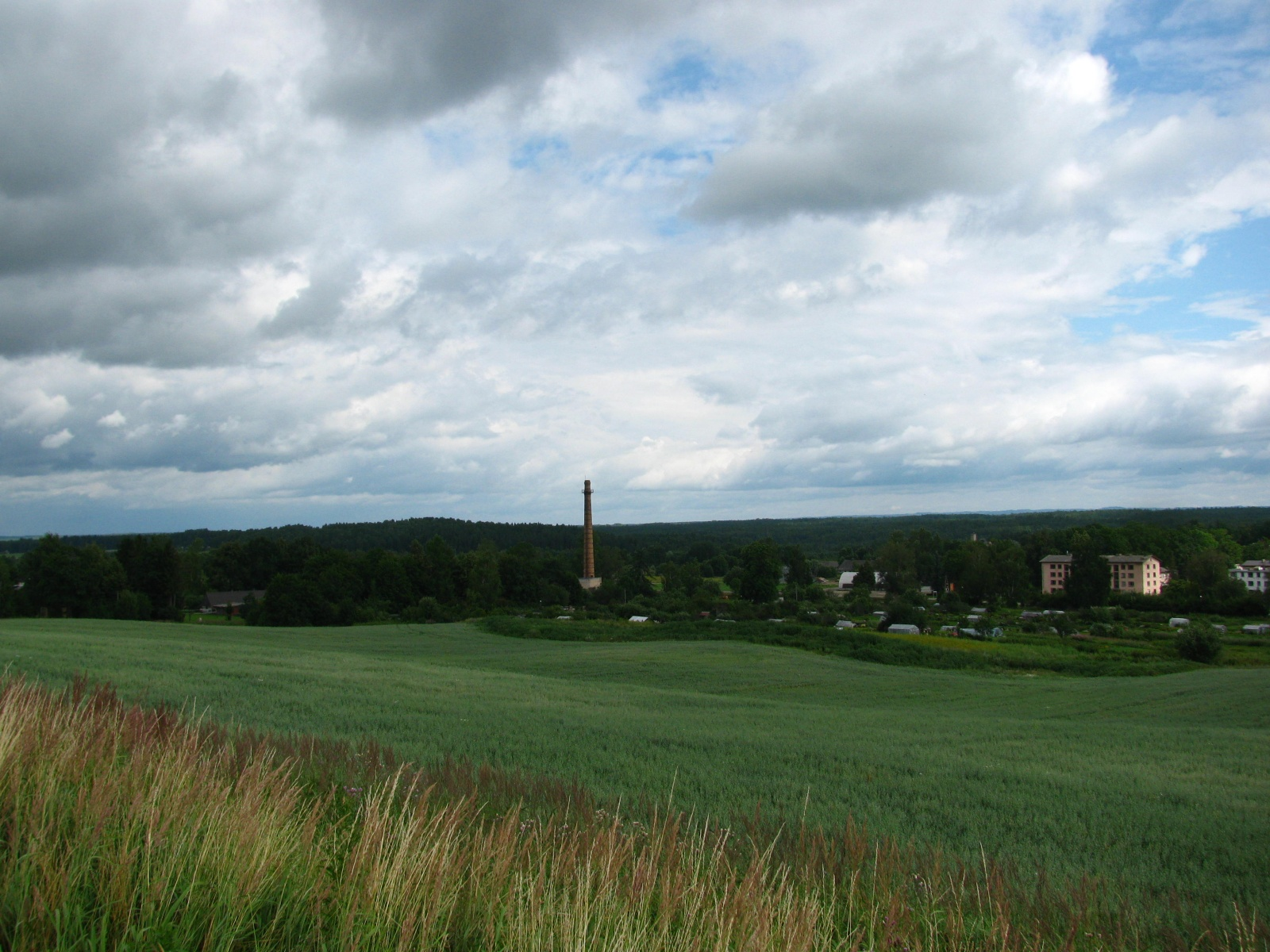
View at Hummuli - panoramio
