= Ala, Valga County =

Village in Estonia

- Village
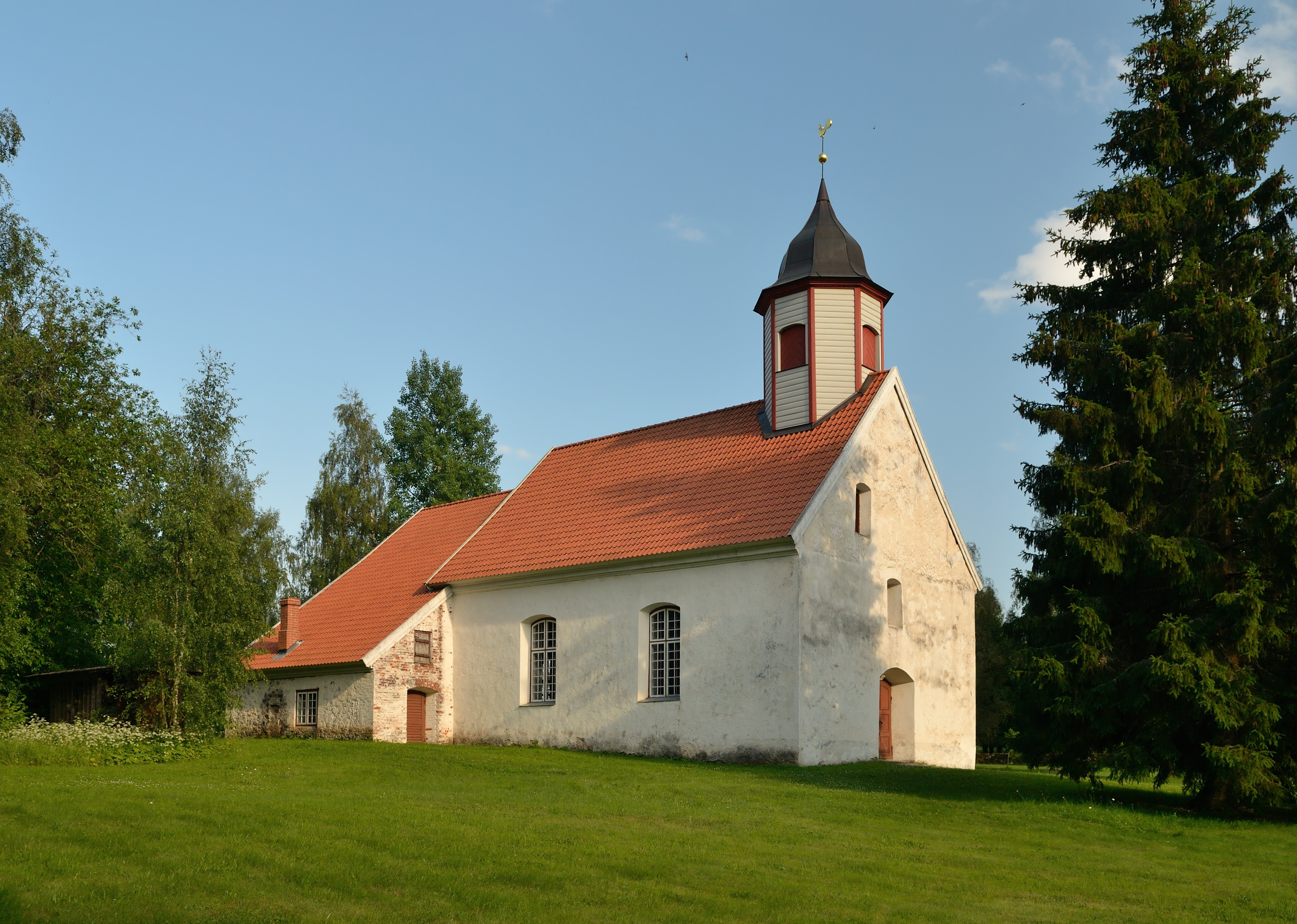
- Taagepera church in Ala

- Location within Estonia
- Coordinates: 58.010389°N 25.6953324°E
- Country: Estonia
- County: Valga County
- Parish: Tõrva Parish
- Time zone: UTC+2 (EET)
  - Summer (DST): UTC+3 (EEST)

Ala is a village in Tõrva Parish, Valga County in Estonia.
