= Kulli, Valga County =

Village in Estonia

- Village
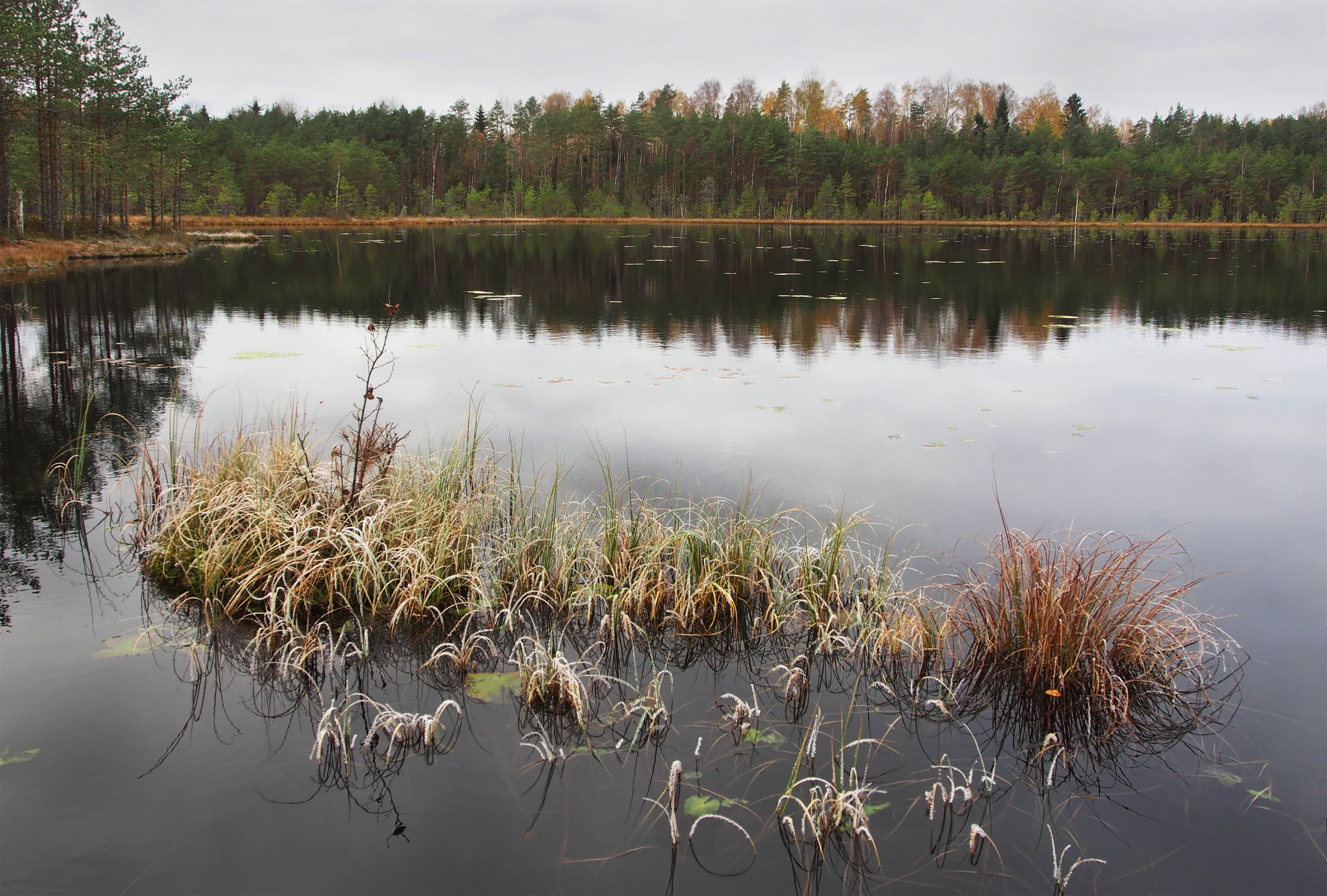
- Lake Raudsepa in Kulli

- Location within Estonia
- Coordinates: 57.921388888889°N 26.023611111111°E
- Country: Estonia
- County: Valga County
- Parish: Tõrva Parish
- Time zone: UTC+2 (EET)
  - Summer (DST): UTC+3 (EEST)

Kulli is a village in Tõrva Parish, Valga County in Estonia.
