= Karjatnurme =

Village in Estonia

- Village
- Location within Estonia
- Coordinates: 58.005555555556°N 25.775°E
- Country: Estonia
- County: Valga County
- Parish: Tõrva Parish
- Time zone: UTC+2 (EET)
  - Summer (DST): UTC+3 (EEST)

Karjatnurme is a village in Tõrva Parish, Valga County in Estonia.
