= Karu, Estonia =

Village in Estonia

Karu
- village
- Location in Estonia
- Coordinates: 58°06′54″N 26°02′32″E
- Country: Estonia
- County: Valga County
- Municipality: Tõrva Parish

Population (01.01.2012)
  - Total: 6

Karu is a village in Tõrva Parish, Valga County, in southern Estonia. Karu has a population of 6 (as of 1 January 2012).
