= Patküla =

Village in Estonia

- Village
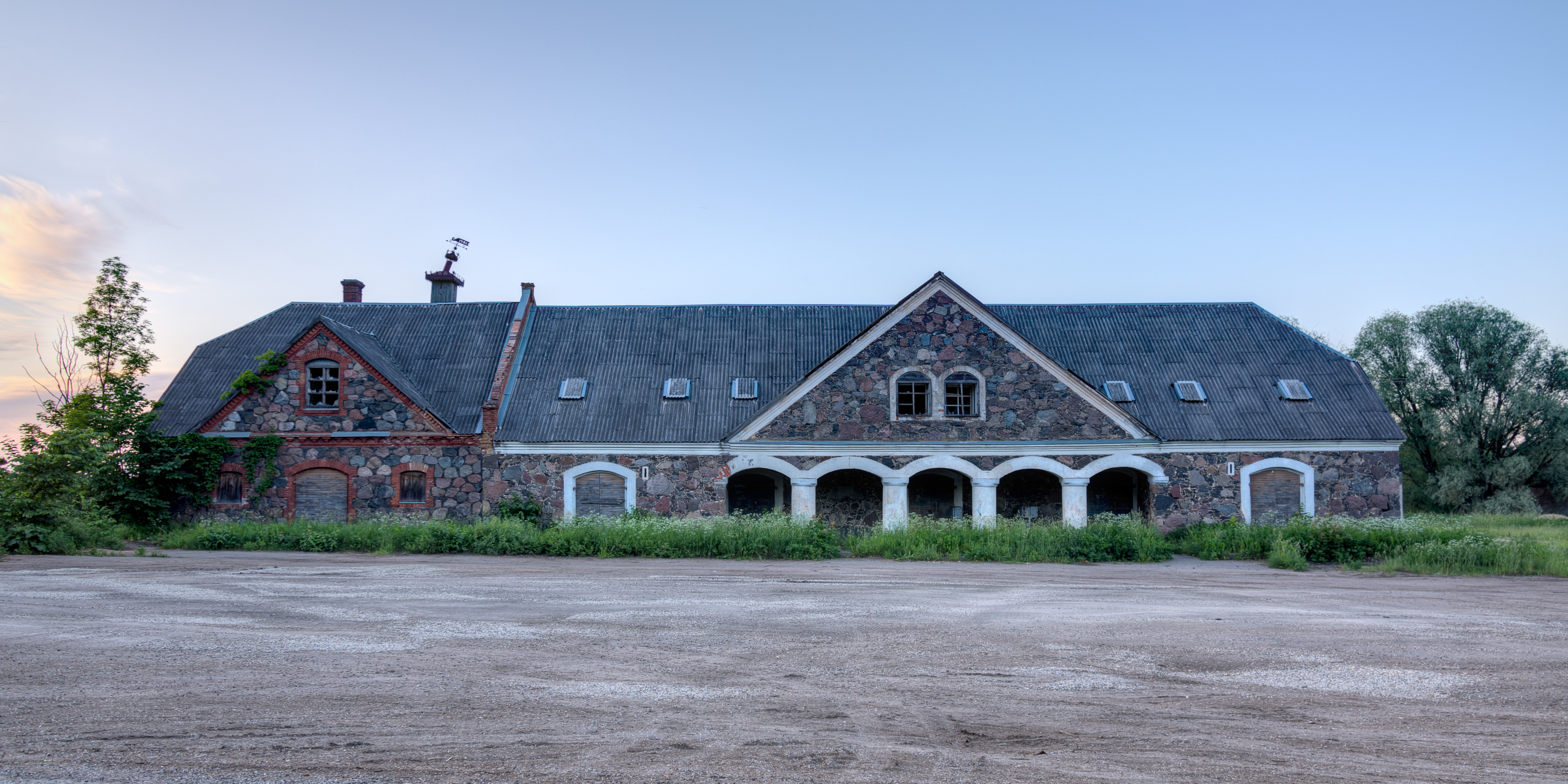
- Patküla manor drying barn

- Location within Estonia
- Coordinates: 57.9794°N 25.9136°E
- Country: Estonia
- County: Valga County
- Parish: Tõrva Parish
- Time zone: UTC+2 (EET)
  - Summer (DST): UTC+3 (EEST)

Patküla is a village in Tõrva Parish, Valga County in Estonia.
