= Kaubi, Valga County =

Village in Estonia

Kaubi
- village
- Location in Estonia
- Coordinates: 58°06′07″N 26°00′39″E
- Country: Estonia
- County: Valga County
- Municipality: Tõrva Parish

Population (01.01.2012)
  - Total: 13

Kaubi is a village in Tõrva Parish, Valga County, in southern Estonia. It has a population of 13 (as of 1 January 2012).
