= Holdre =

Village in Estonia

- Village
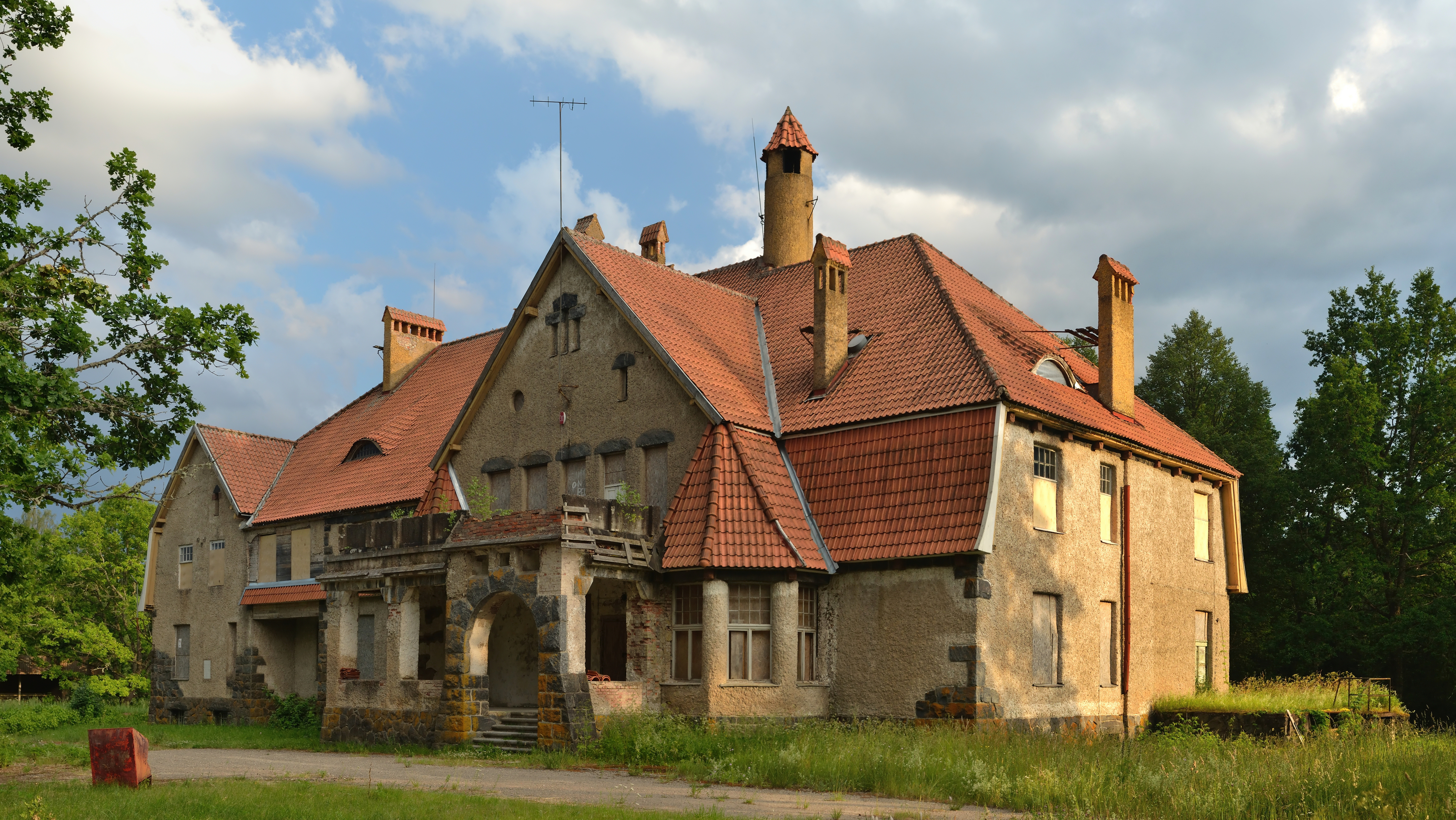
- Holdre manor

- Location in Estonia
- Coordinates: 57°56′37.3″N 25°44′25.5″E
- Country: Estonia
- County: Valga County
- Municipality: Tõrva Parish

Holdre is a village in Tõrva Parish, Valga County (previously in Viljandi County) in Estonia.

== Holdre manor ==
As a landed estate, the manor of Holdre (German: Hollershof) has a history that goes back to at least 1597. Throughout most of its history, the manor was owned by different aristocratic Baltic German families. During the Soviet occupation of Estonia, it was used by the Young Pioneer Organization of the Soviet Union.

The main building of the manor house was modernized in about 1910 by Woldemar von Ditmar. It was built to the design of Otto Wildau, a Riga-based architect who also designed the nearby Taagepera Castle and in a similar style: Art Nouveau with heavy influences from Finnish National Romanticism. The likeness between the two manors is perhaps because the owner of Holdre estate at the time, Ditmar, was the brother-in-law of the landowner at Sangaste, Hugo von Stryk. The manor house of Holdre is the lesser of the two, being a single-storey building rich in façade decoration typical for its style.

== Notable people ==
- Johan Kõpp

== See also ==
- List of palaces and manor houses in Estonia
