= Tõrva =

Town in Estonia

- Town
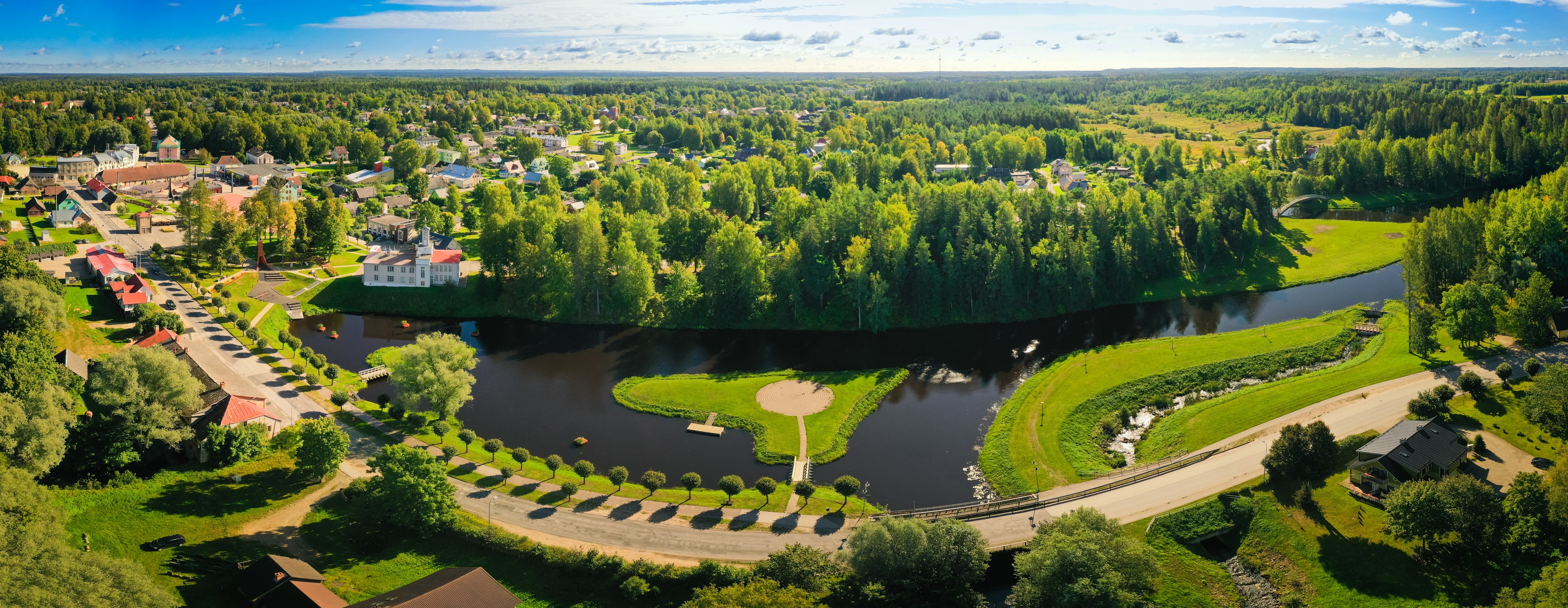
- Motto: "Home between lakes" (Kodu järvede keskel)
- Location in Estonia
- Coordinates: 58°0′10″N 25°55′25″E
- Country: Estonia
- County: Valga County
- Municipality: Tõrva Parish
- Town rights: 2 July 1926

Area
  - Total: 4.80 km^{2} (1.85 sq mi)

Population (2026)
  - Total: 2,549
  - Rank: 32nd
  - Density: 531/km^{2} (1,380/sq mi)

Tõrva (German: Törwa) is a town (Estonian: linn) in Tõrva Parish, Valga County, southern Estonia. It is located on the banks of the Õhne River. Tõrva has an area of 4.80 km^{2} (2 sq mi) and a population of about 2,500 (as of 1 January 2026), making it the second largest of the three towns in Valga County.

The borough (alev) of Tõrva gained its town rights on 2 July 1926.

The town's last mayor, Maido Ruusmann, was elected on 5 November 2013.

== International relations ==
=== Twin towns — Sister cities ===
The former urban municipality of Tõrva (until 2017) was twinned with:

Essunga municipality, Sweden; Grantsville, United States; Hemsedal municipality, Norway	Laihia municipality, Finland; Łuków, Poland; Timrå municipality, Sweden

== Gallery ==
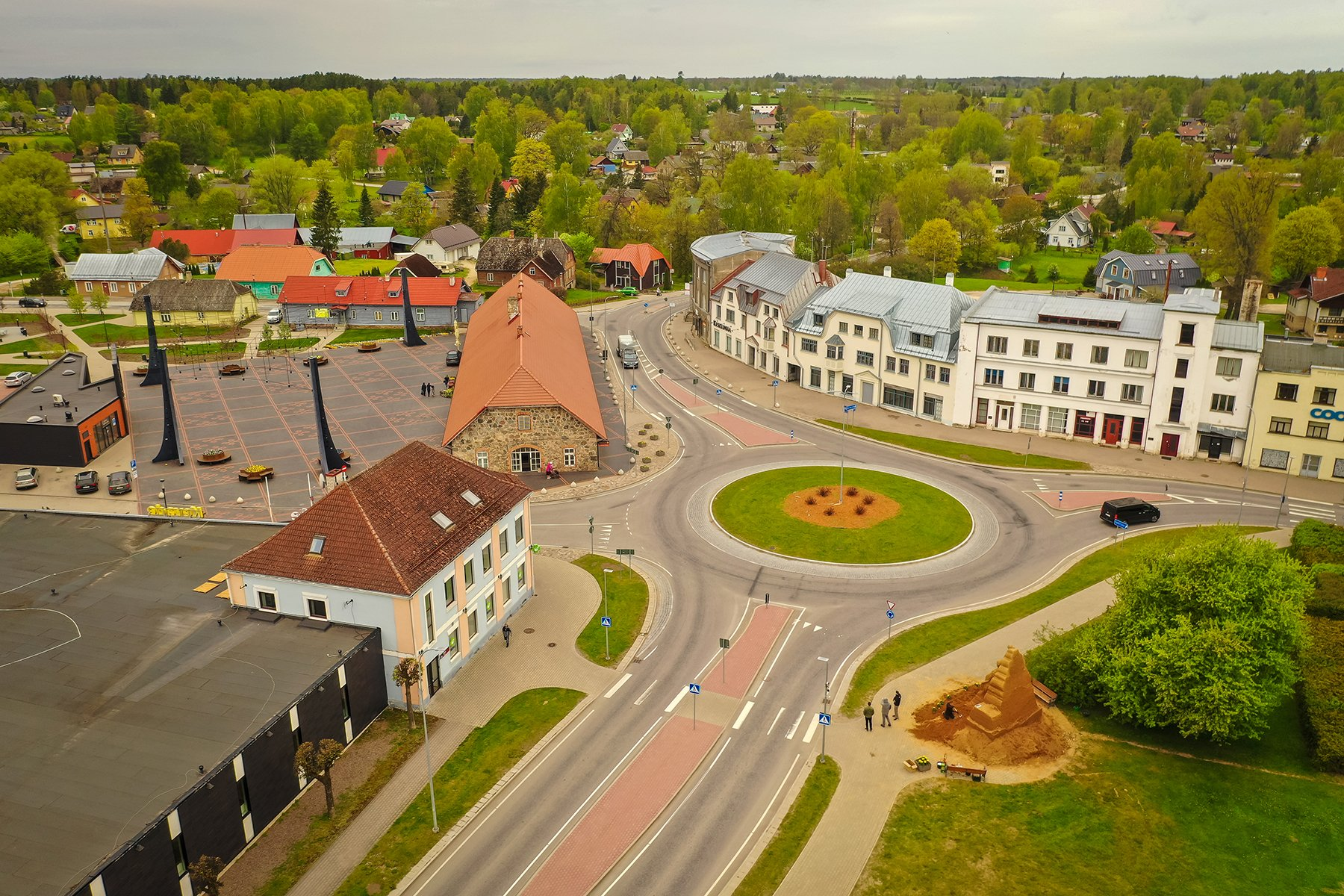
Town square

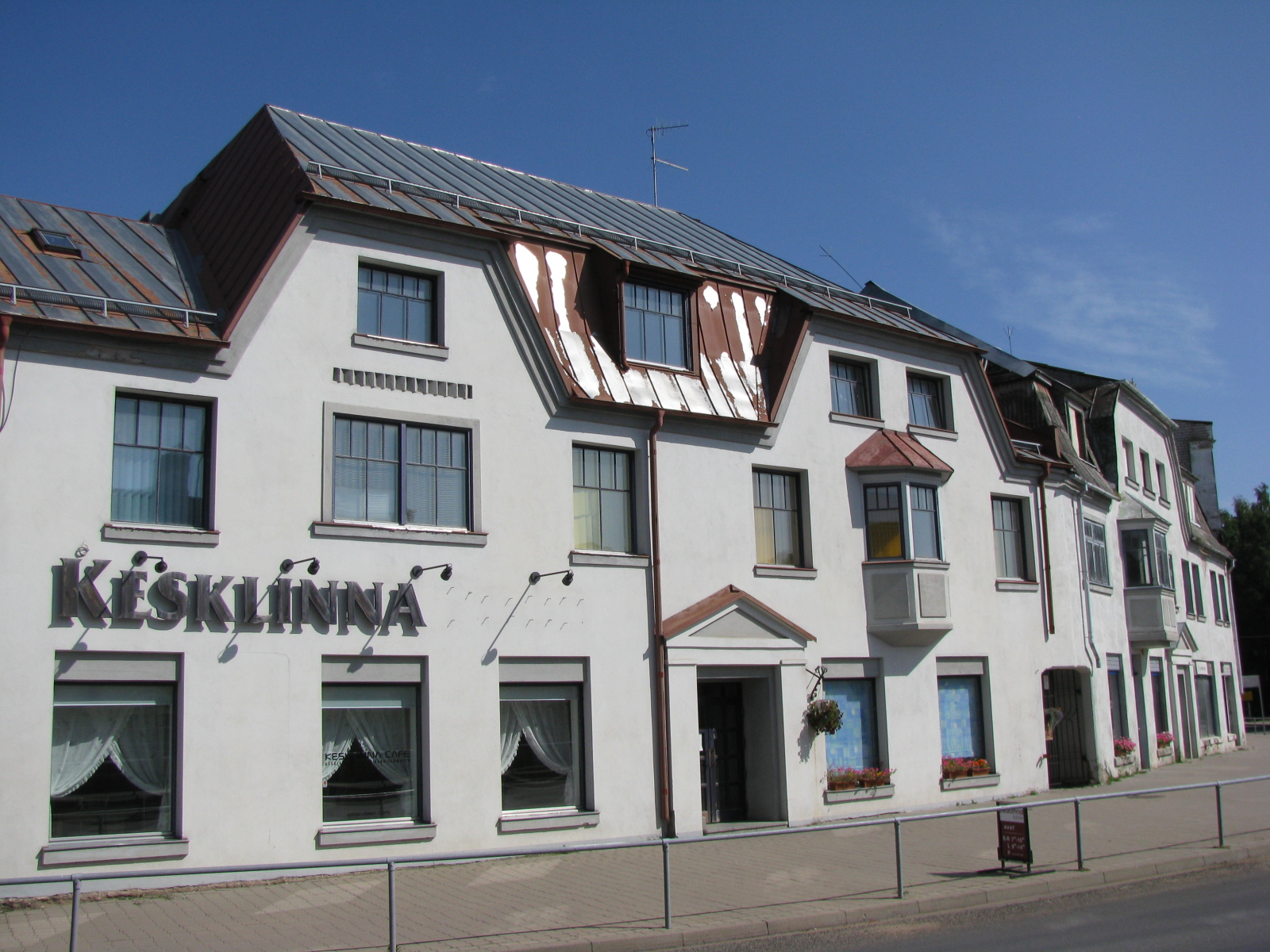
Businesses in Tõrva

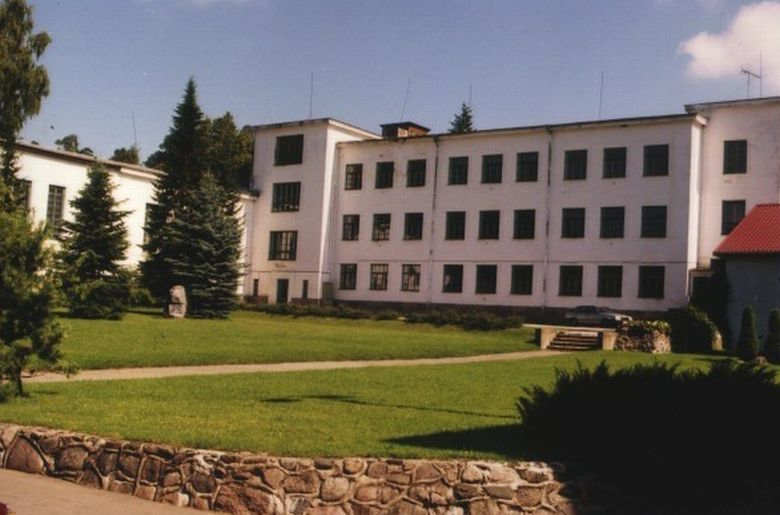
Tõrva Gymnasium

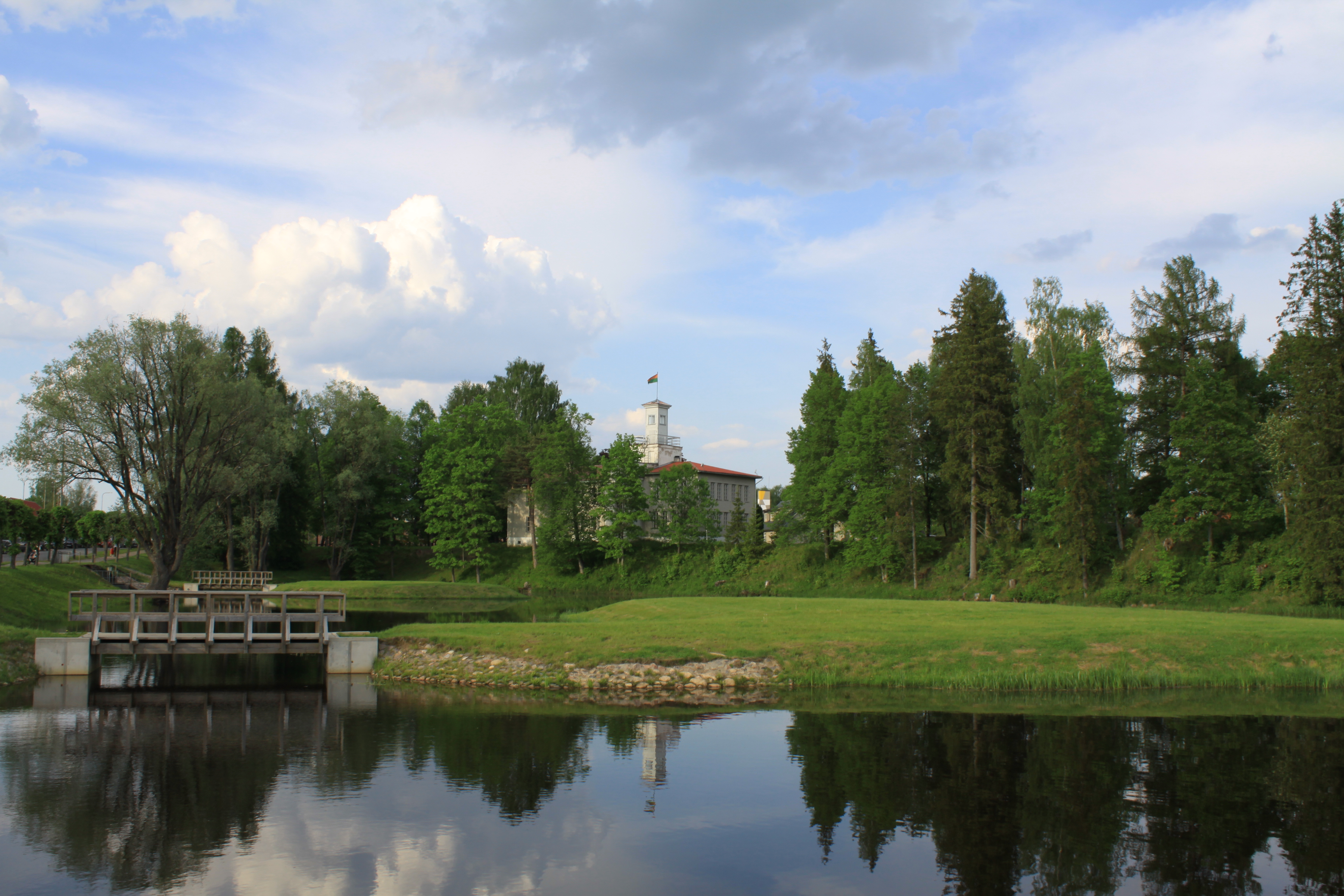
Õhne river conservation area

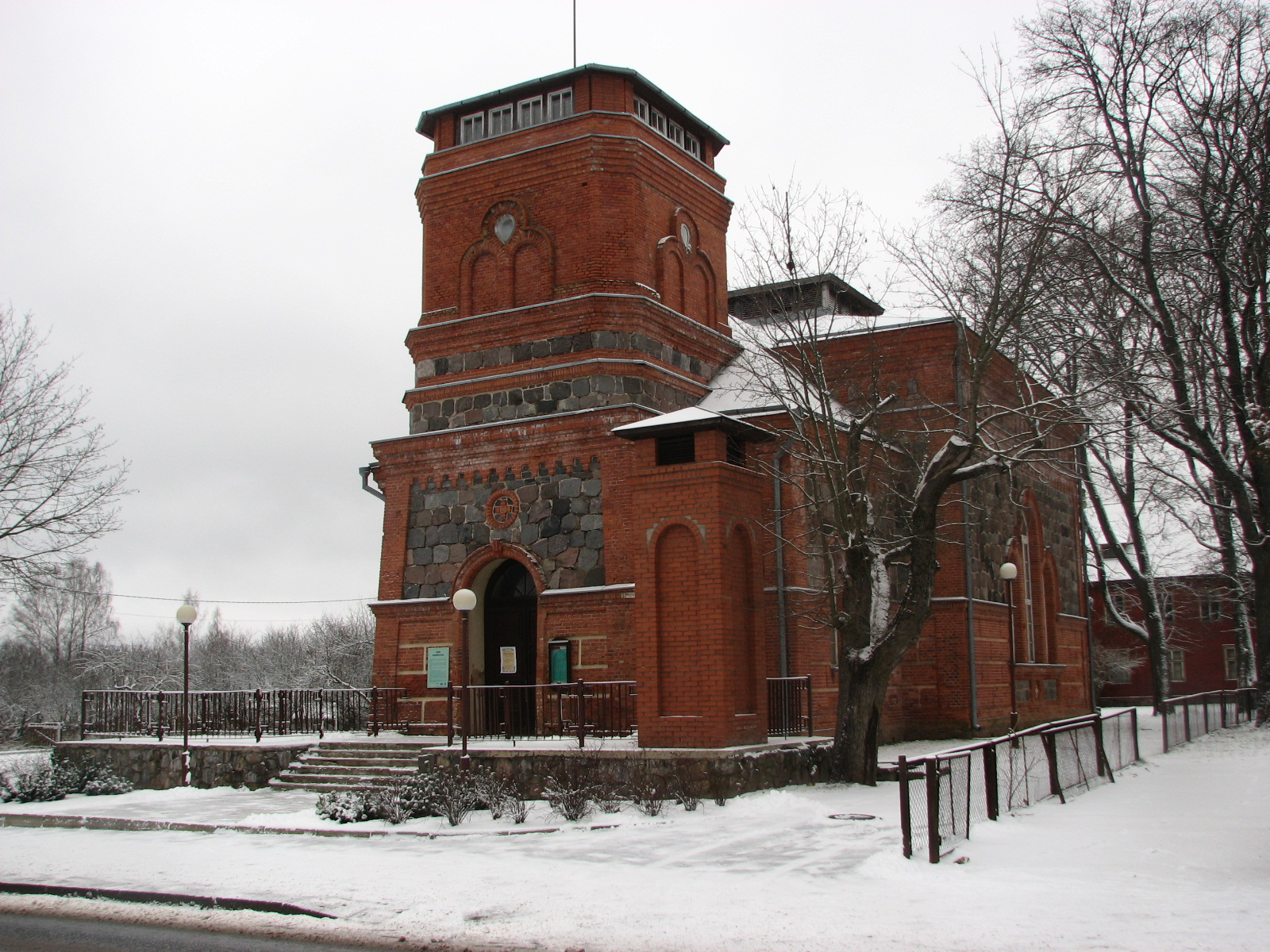
Tõrva church

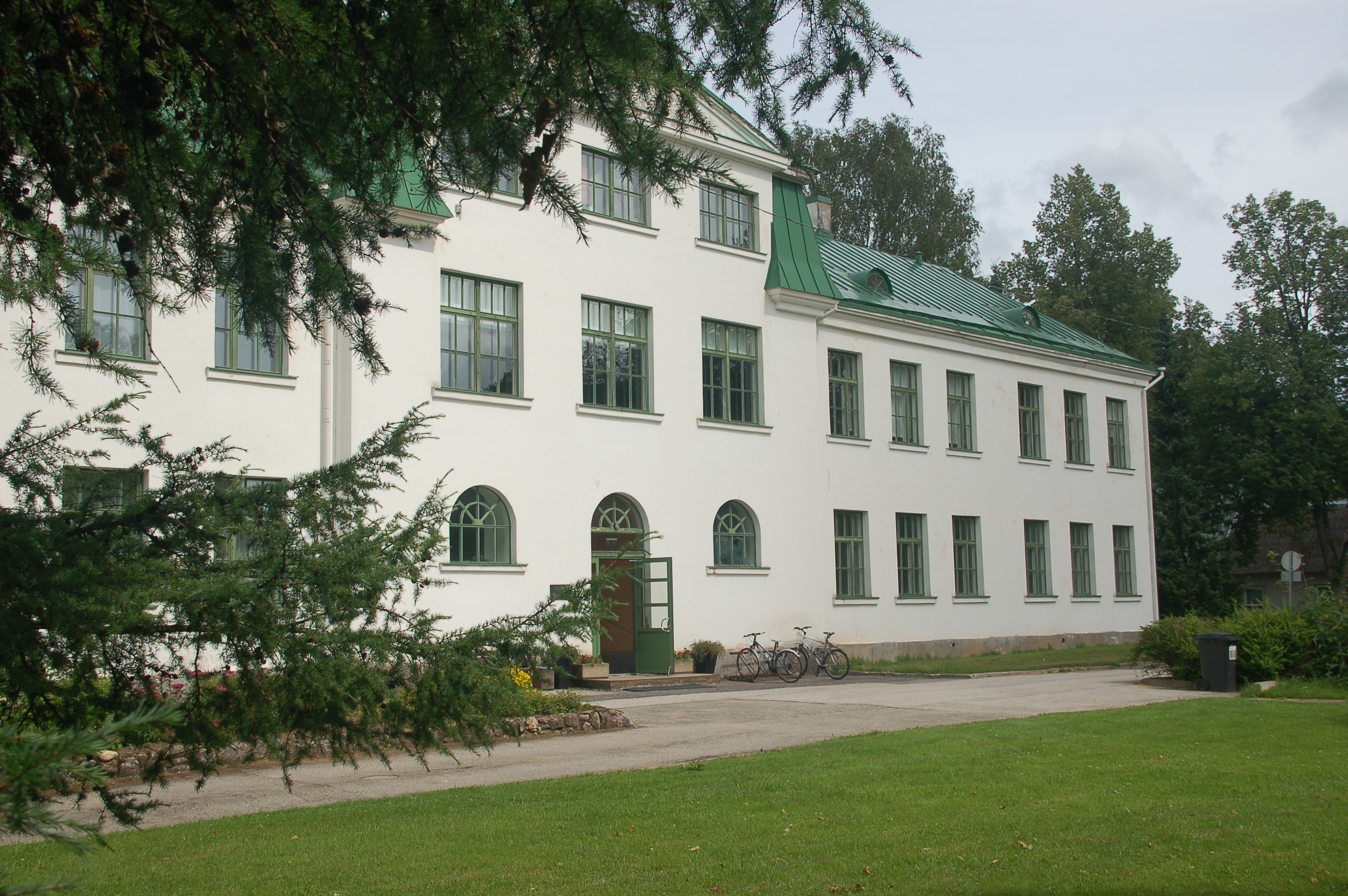
Town library

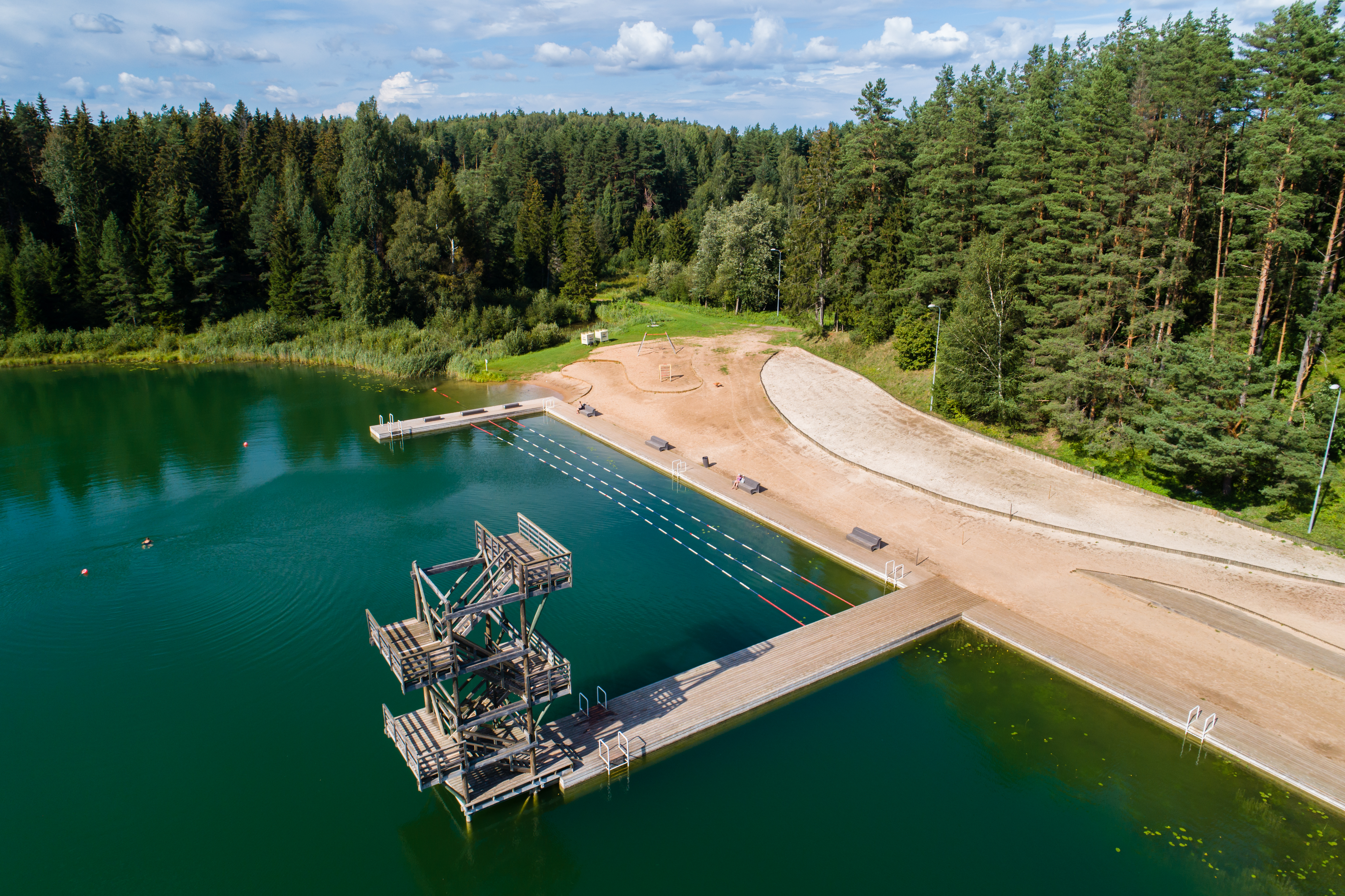
Lake Vanamõisa

== Notable people ==
- Ants Taul (born 1950 in Tõrva), musician and instrument-maker, helped revive the Estonian bagpipe, the torupill.
- Magnus Kirt (born 1990 in Tõrva), athlete who competed in the javelin throw, silver medallist at the 2019 World Athletics Championships.
