= Taagepera =

Village in Estonia

- Village
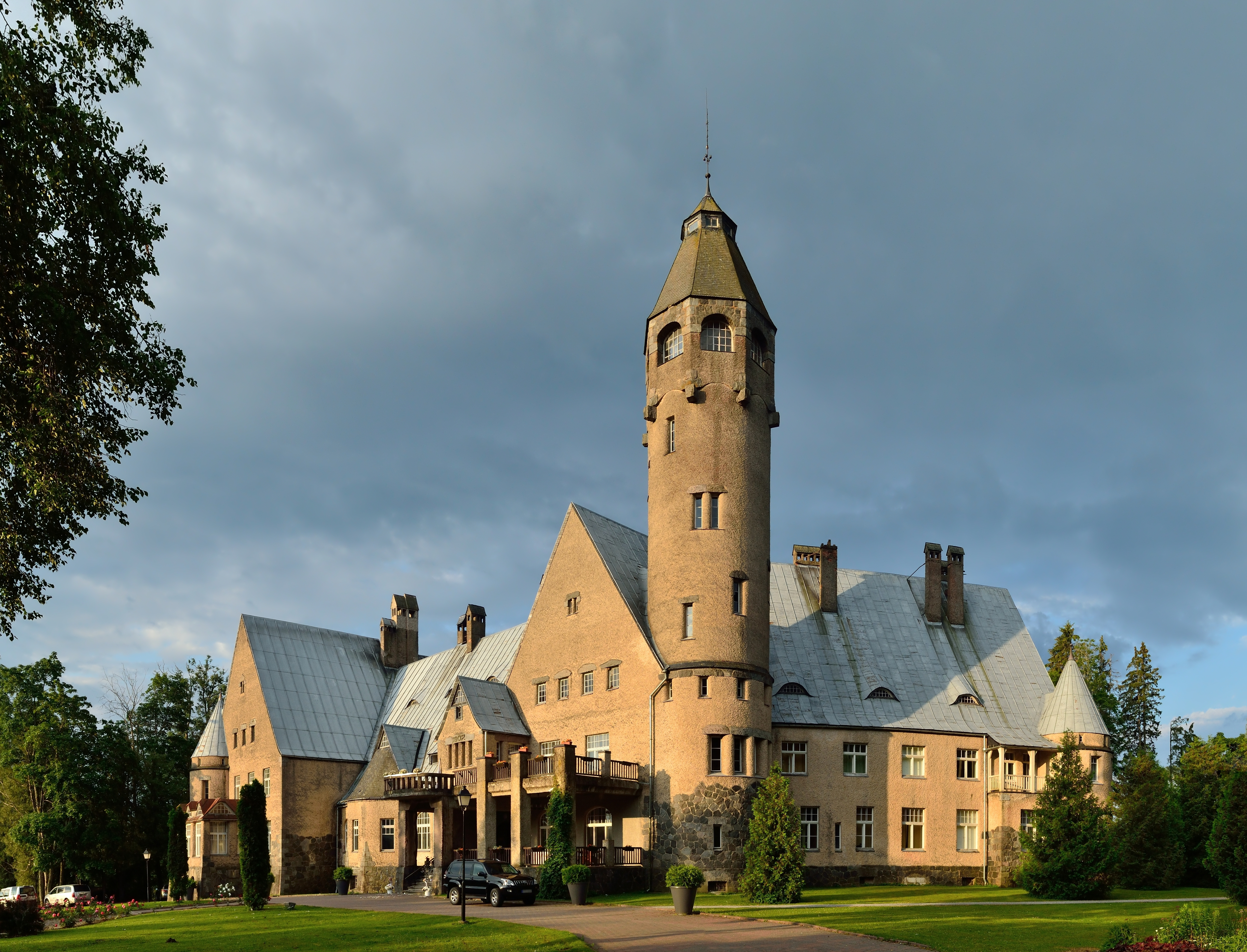
- Taagepera Castle

- Location in Estonia
- Coordinates: 57°59′37″N 25°40′04″E
- Country: Estonia
- County: Valga County
- Municipality: Tõrva Parish

Population (01.01.2011)
  - Total: 109

Taagepera is a village in Tõrva Parish, Valga County, in southern Estonia. It has a population of 109 (as of 1 January 2011).

The village was first documented in 1420 as Wafencul, and later as Waagenkül. The current Estonian name of the place is derived from the Baltic German Stackelberg nobility, who owned the estate from 1674 to 1796.

Taagepera is known for its Jugendstil castle.

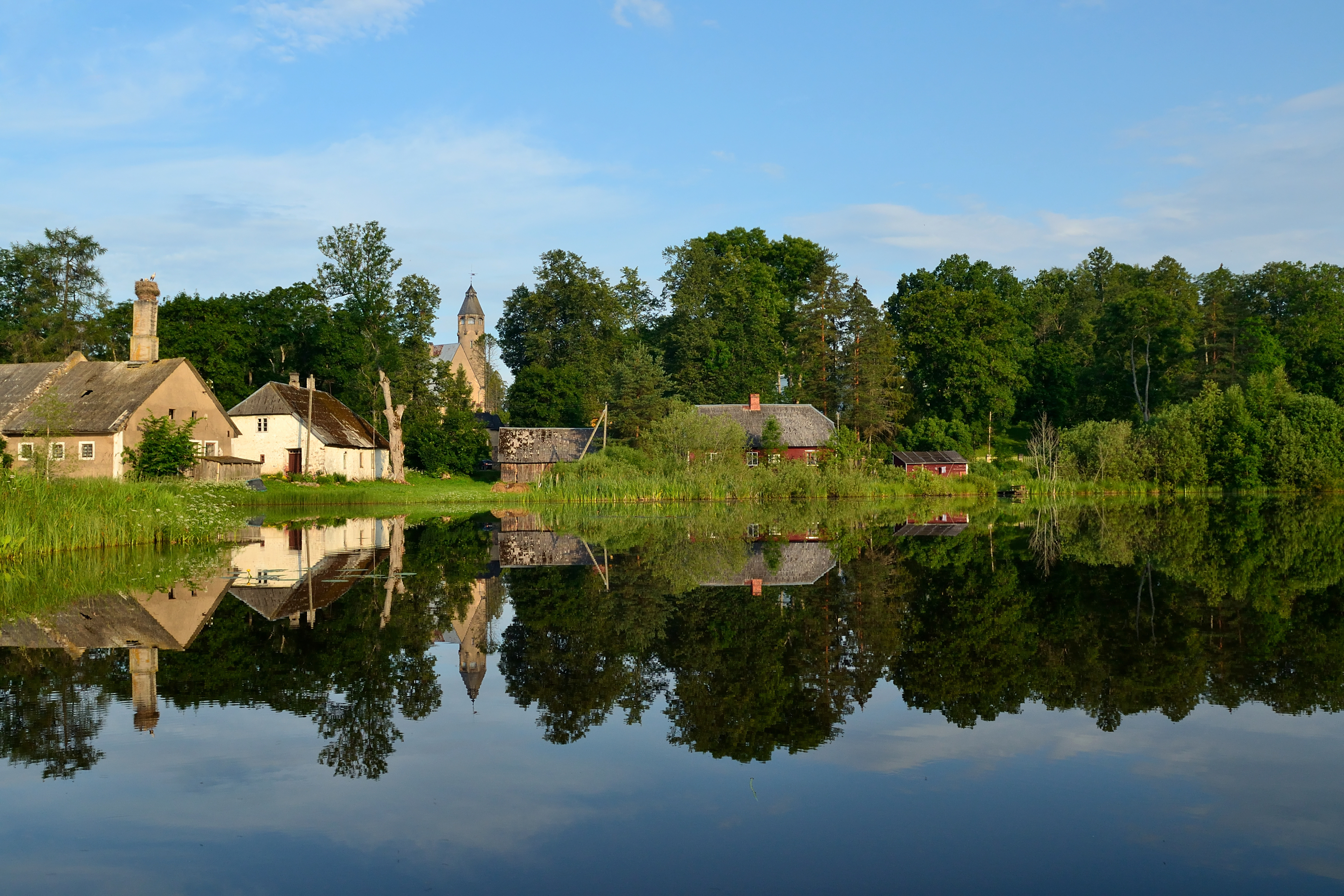
Lake Taagepera

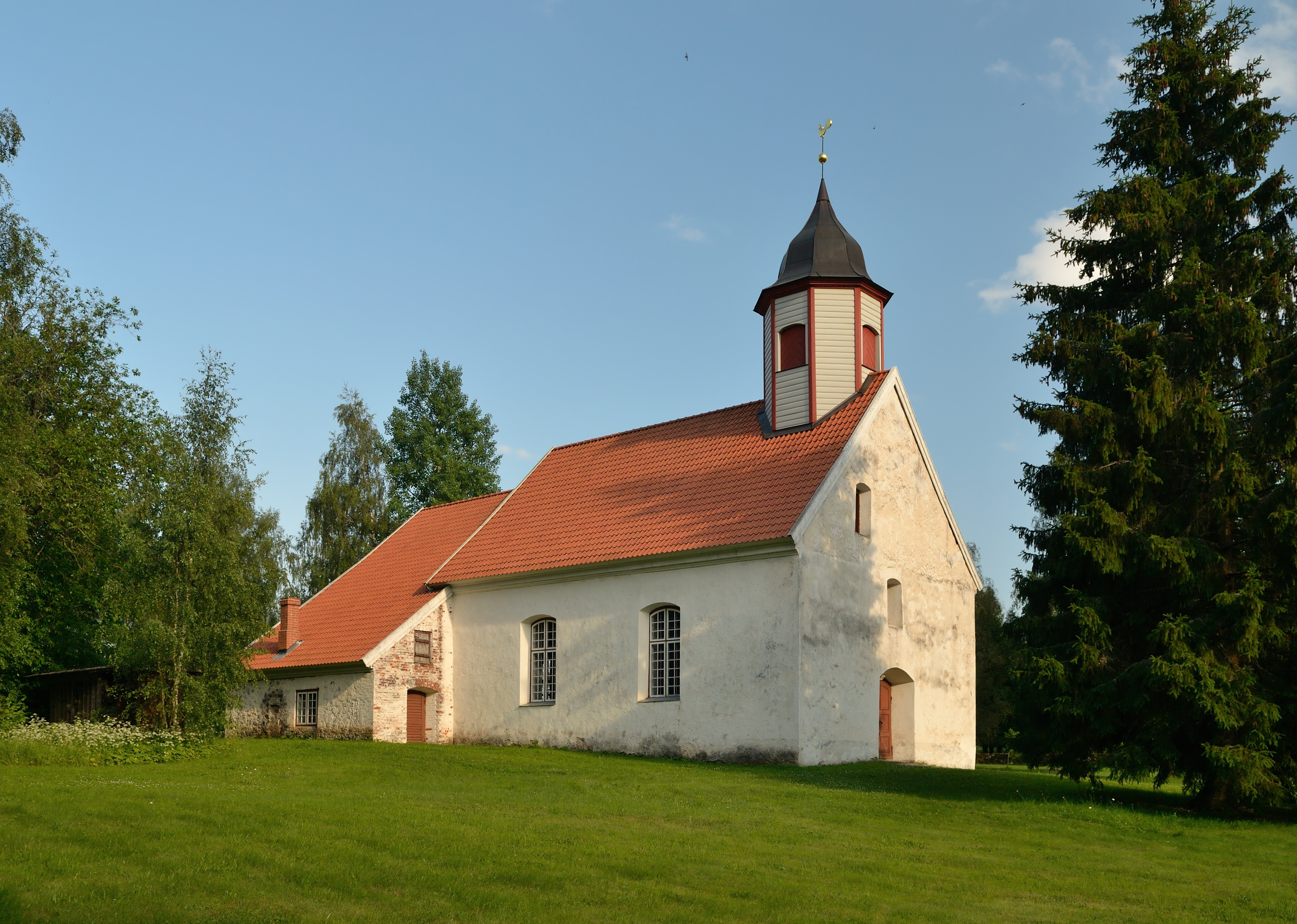
Taagepera Church

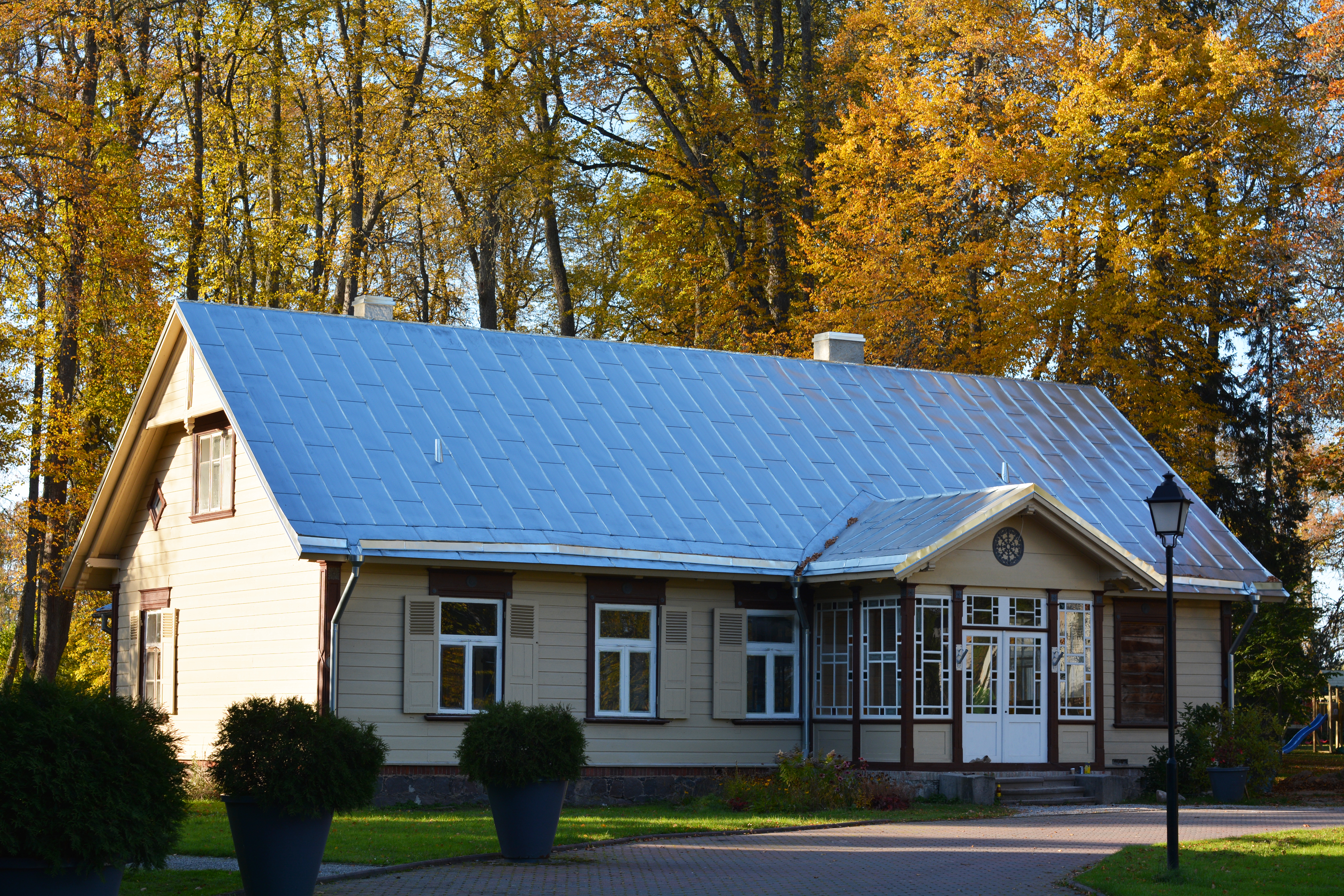
Manor steward's house

== Notable people ==
- Jaak Aab (born 1960), politician
