= Taagepera Castle =

Castle in Estonia

Coordinates: 57°59′35″N 25°39′58″E

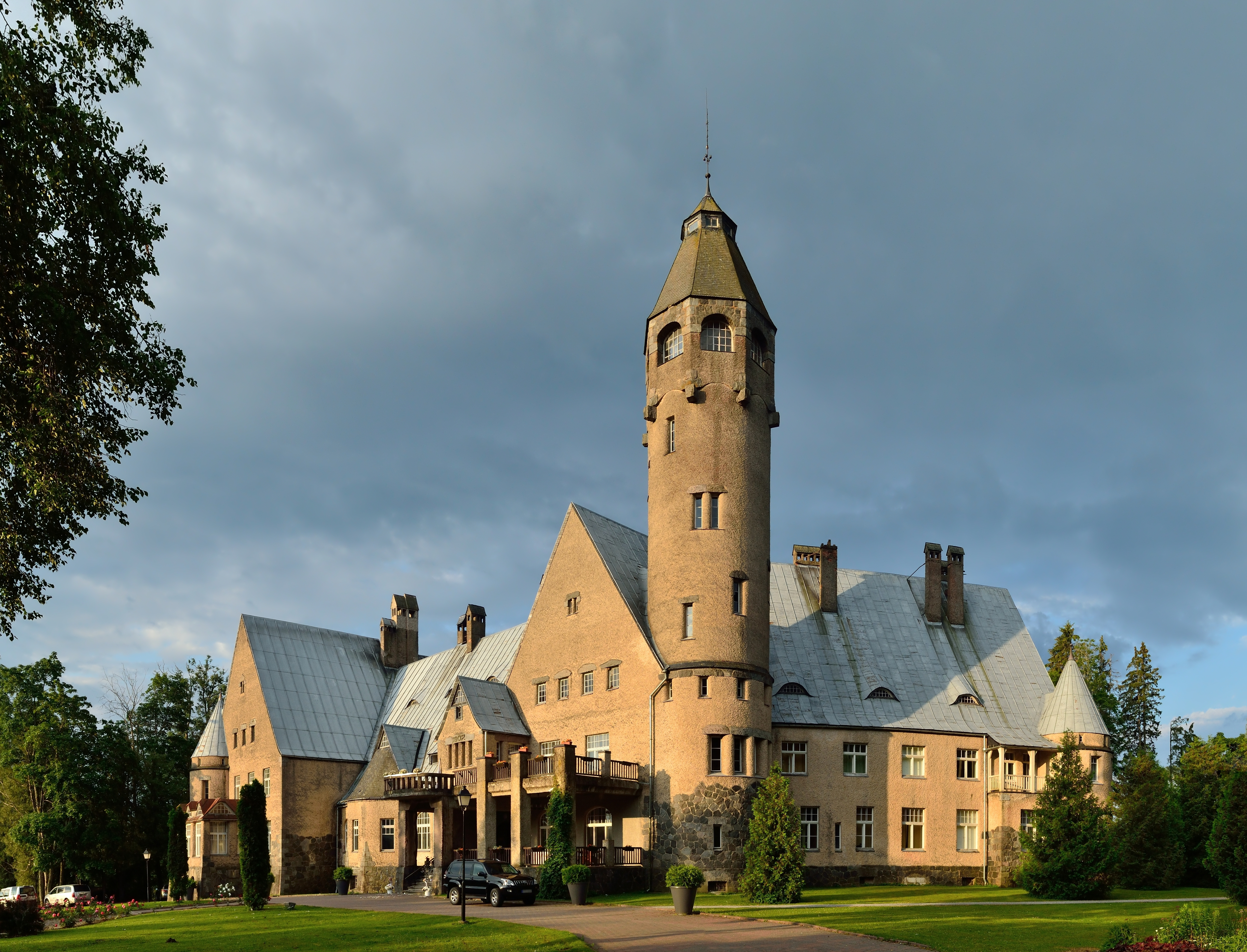
Taagepera Castle

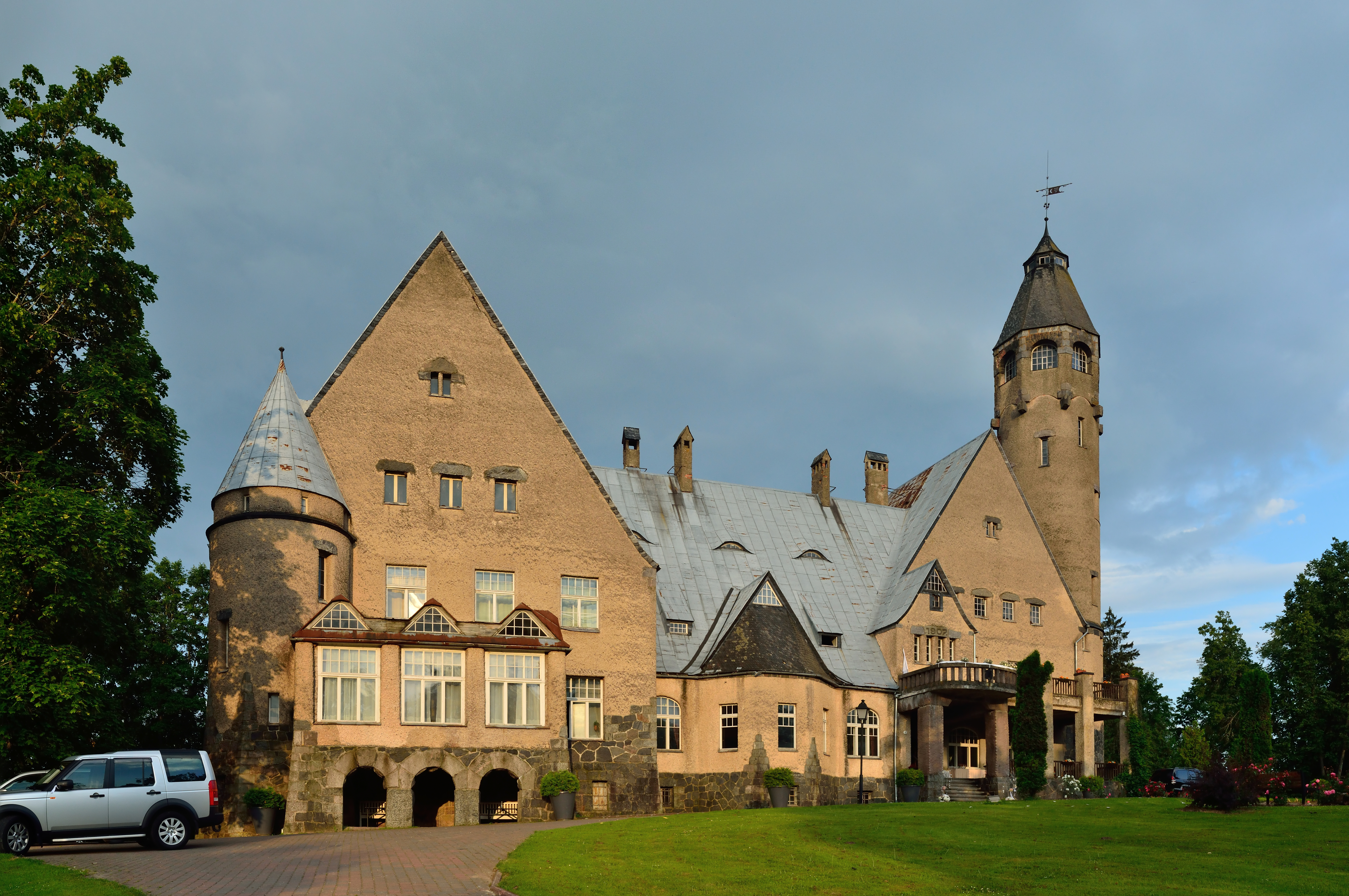
Taagepera Castle

Taagepera Castle (German name: Wagenküll) is a mansion in Taagepera village, Helme Parish, Valga County, Estonia. It was registered as a national cultural monument on 27 September 1999.

== History ==
The first recorded mention of the mansion dates to the 16th century.

During the Polish rule and Swedish rule of Estonia, the mansion belonged to the Rehbinder family. In 1674, it was sold to the Swedish major Otto von Stackelberg.

In 1819, the almost bankrupt mansion was sold to Bernhard Heinrich von Stryk (1746–1829), who married Anna Elisabeth von Oetting (1763–1825) in 1782. The last owner of the mansion was his great-grandson Hugo von Stryk, who lost the mansion in the 1919 land reform.

== Mansion complex ==
=== Mansion house ===
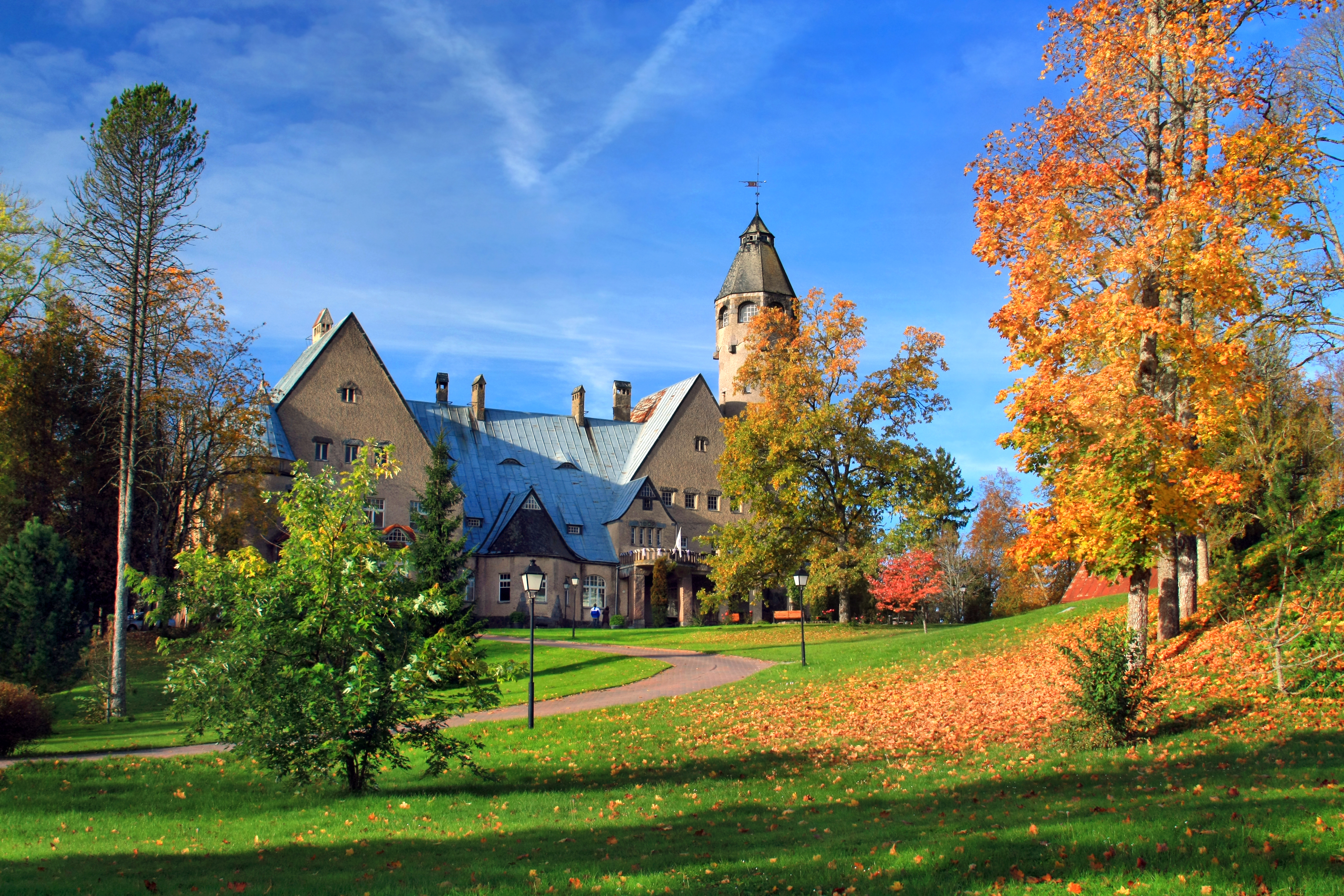
Taagepera manor main building

The current mansion house was built in 1907 to an Art Nouveau design by the German architect Otto Wildau. The western corner of the house includes a 40-metre tall tower. Because of the large size of the mansion house, it is commonly called a castle.

After the Estonian War of Independence in 1919, the mansion house was converted into a sanatorium. In the late 1930s, a new sanatorium building was added, designed by the architect Alar Kotli. The mansion house served as a sanatorium until 2000; since 2002 it has been a hotel. In mid-2018 it reopened after renovations as Castle Wagenküll Spa Hotel.

=== Graveyard ===
In the late 19th century, a family graveyard was constructed near the mansion house. Among those buried there are:

- Katharina Mathilde von Stryk (née Rogge), born 15 July 1815 – died 13 April 1892
- Bernhard Heinrich Konstantin von Stryk, born 29 July 1827 – died 5 January 1912

== Postage stamps ==
In 1933, Eesti Post designed a series of four stamps with an anti-tuberculosis theme, of which the blue/red 10-cent stamp and the dark blue/red 20-cent stamp depict the Taagepera mansion house (at that time a sanatorium). A new stamp depicting the Taagepera mansion house was issued in 2006.

== See also ==
- List of palaces and manor houses in Estonia
- The Last Motor Race of The Empire Pages 35 - 36

== Gallery ==
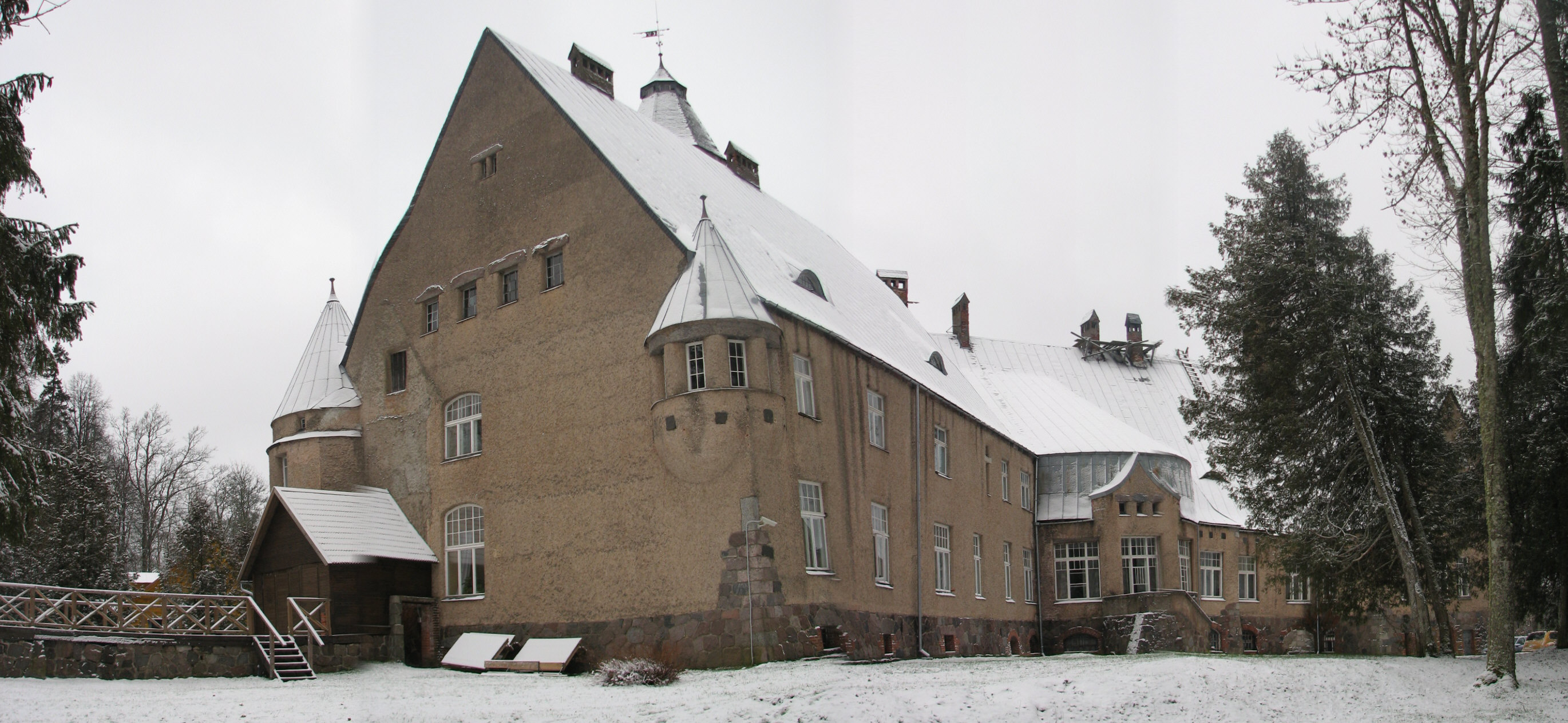
Exterior view

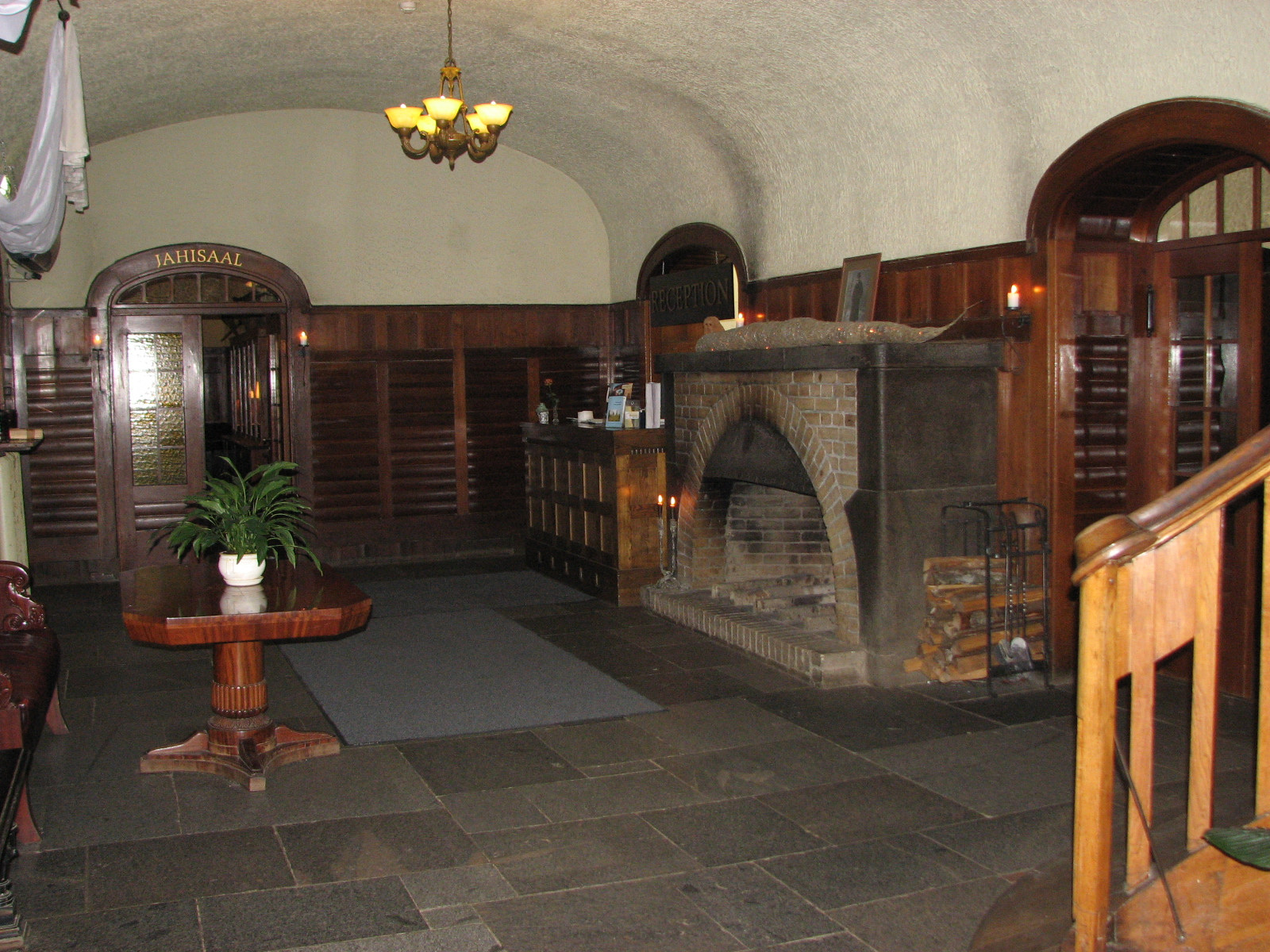
Lobby

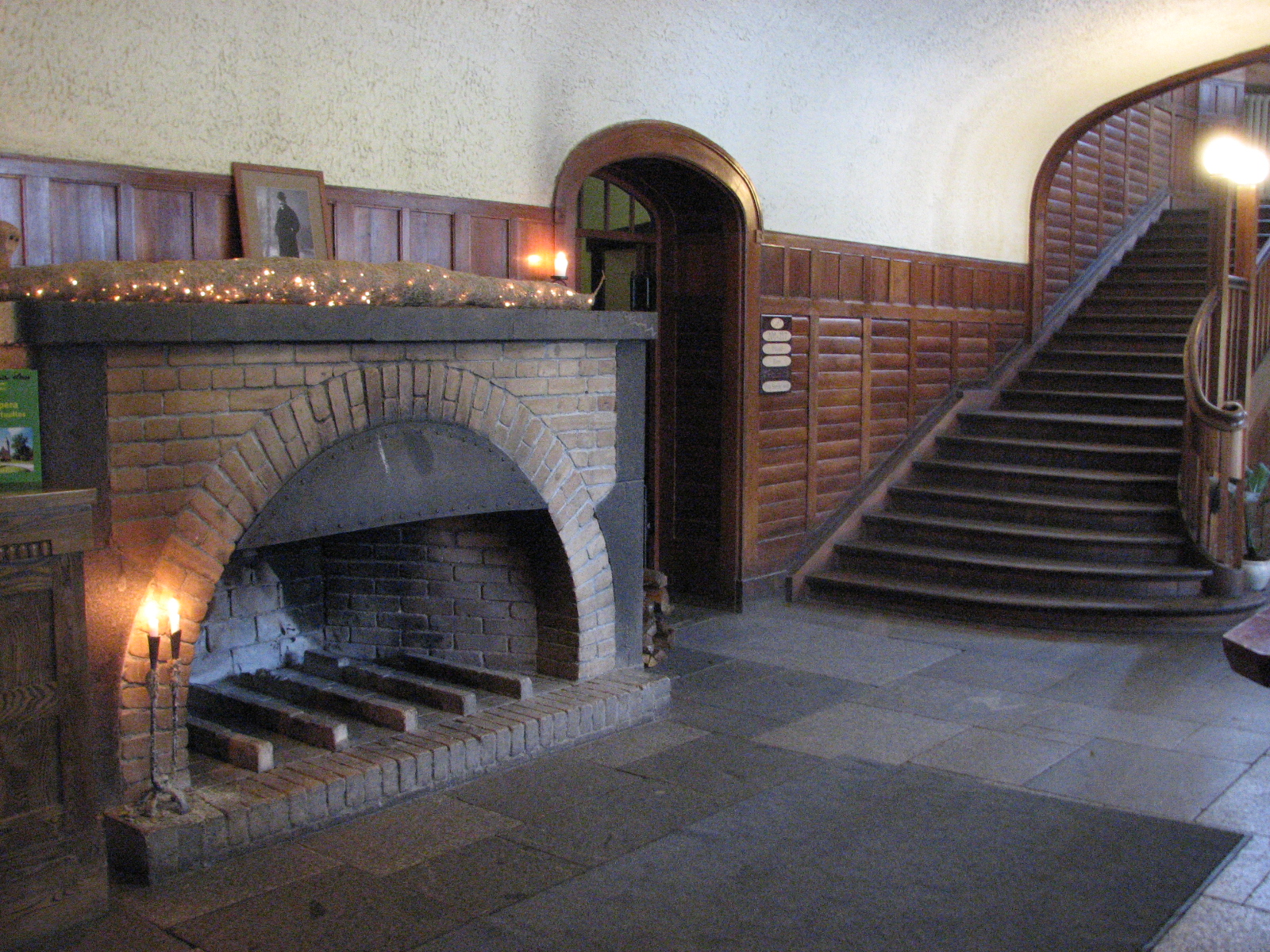
Lobby

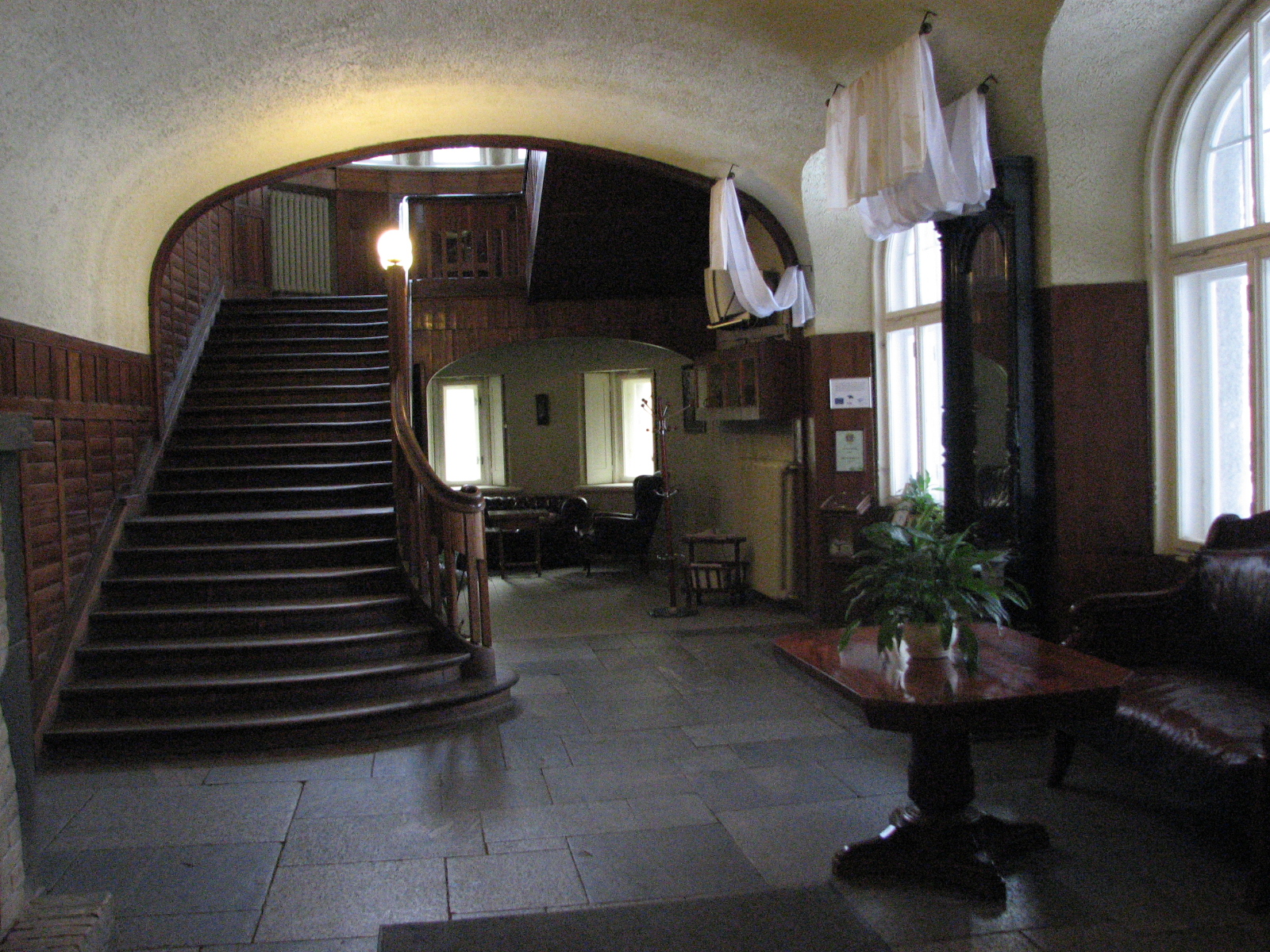
Lobby

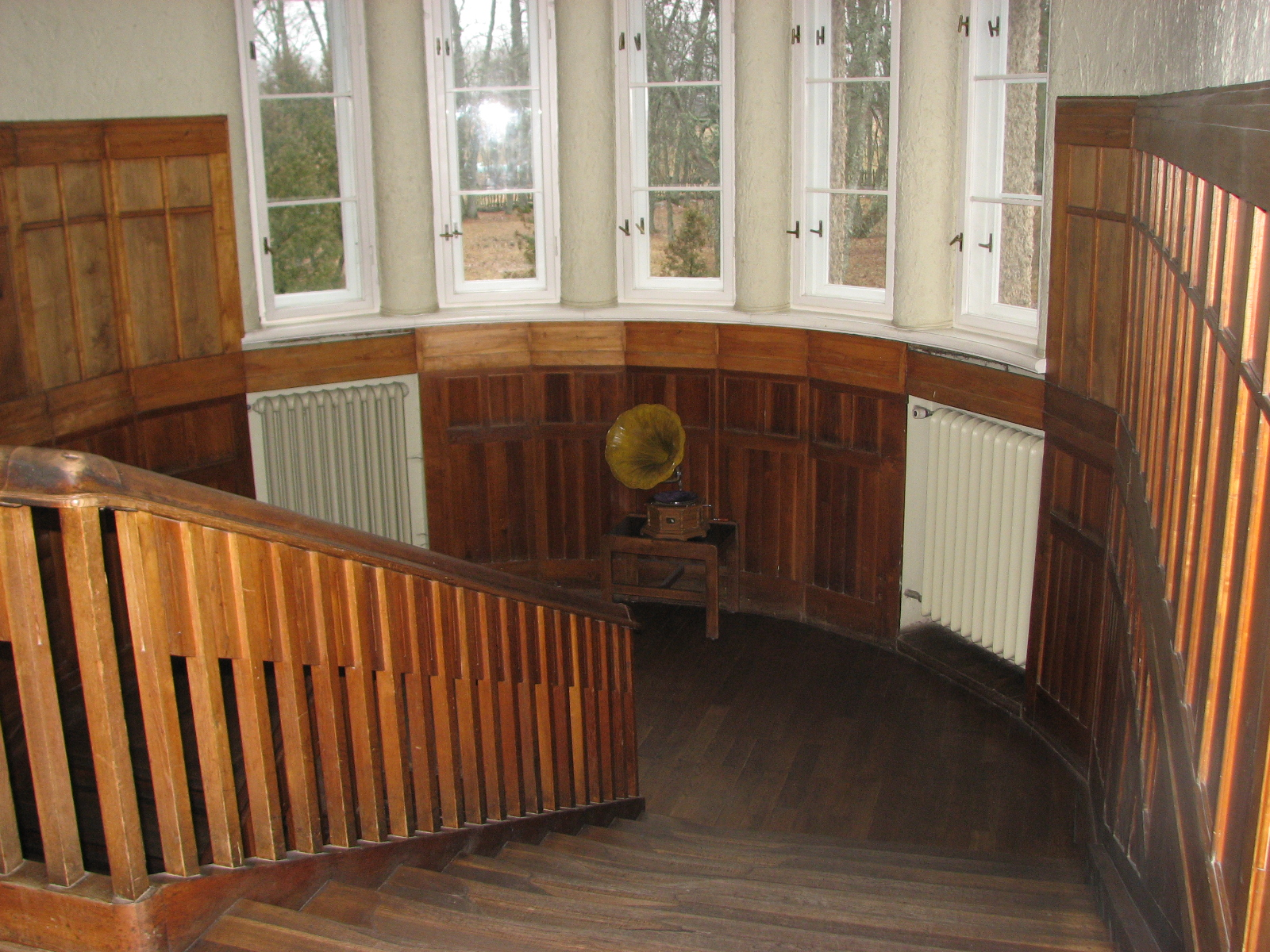
Stairway to second floor

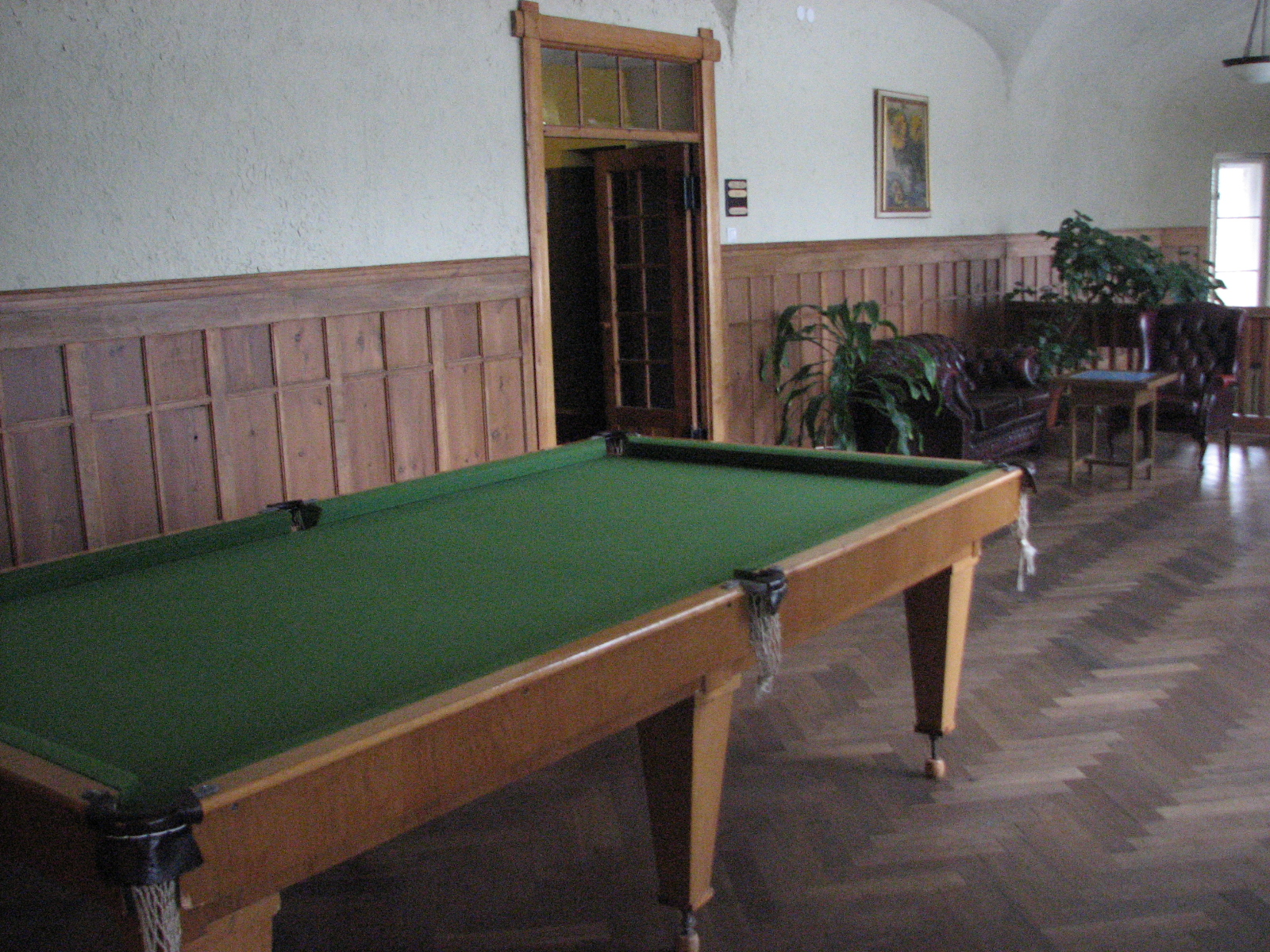
Billiards room on the second floor

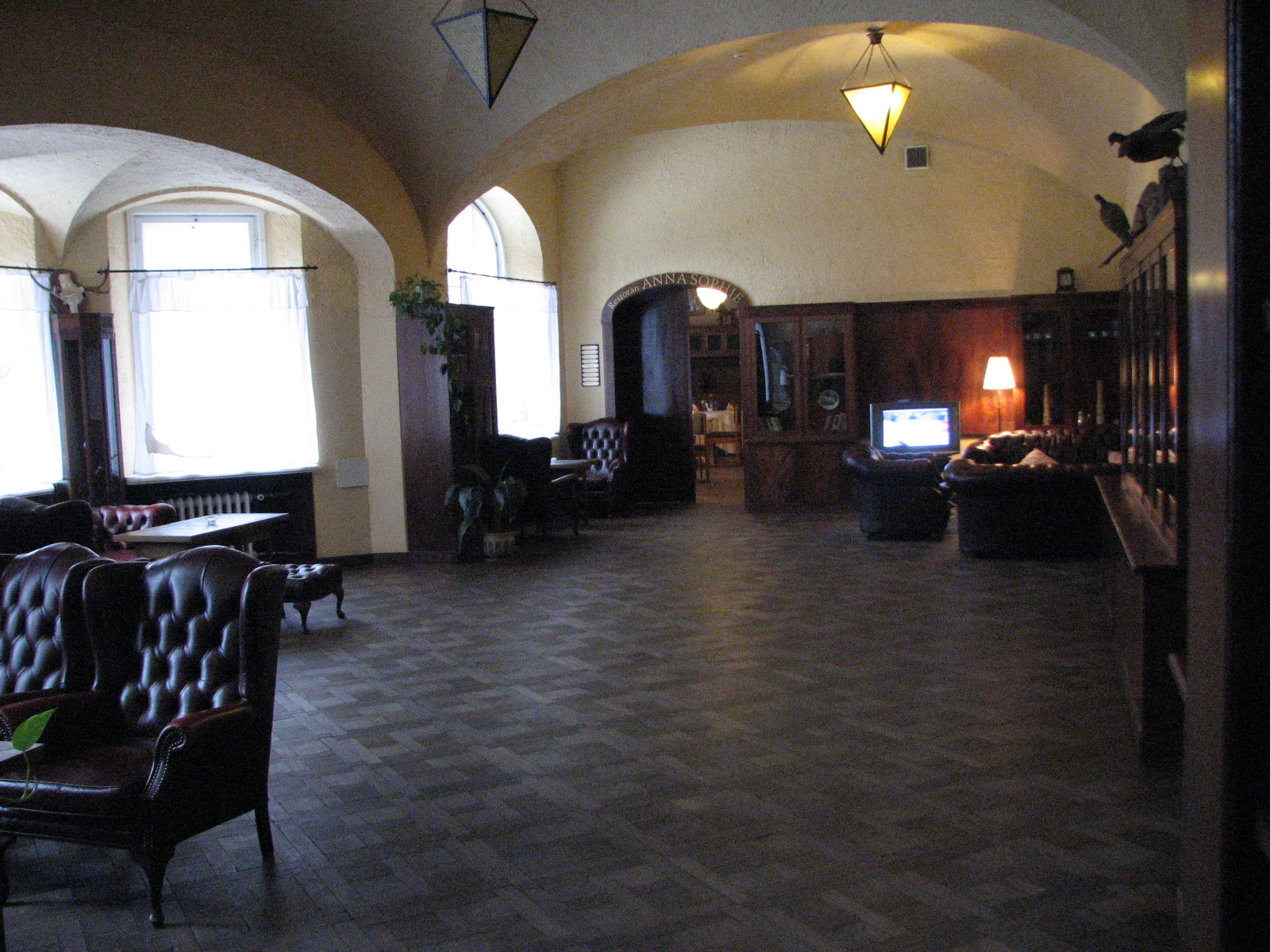
Jahisaal

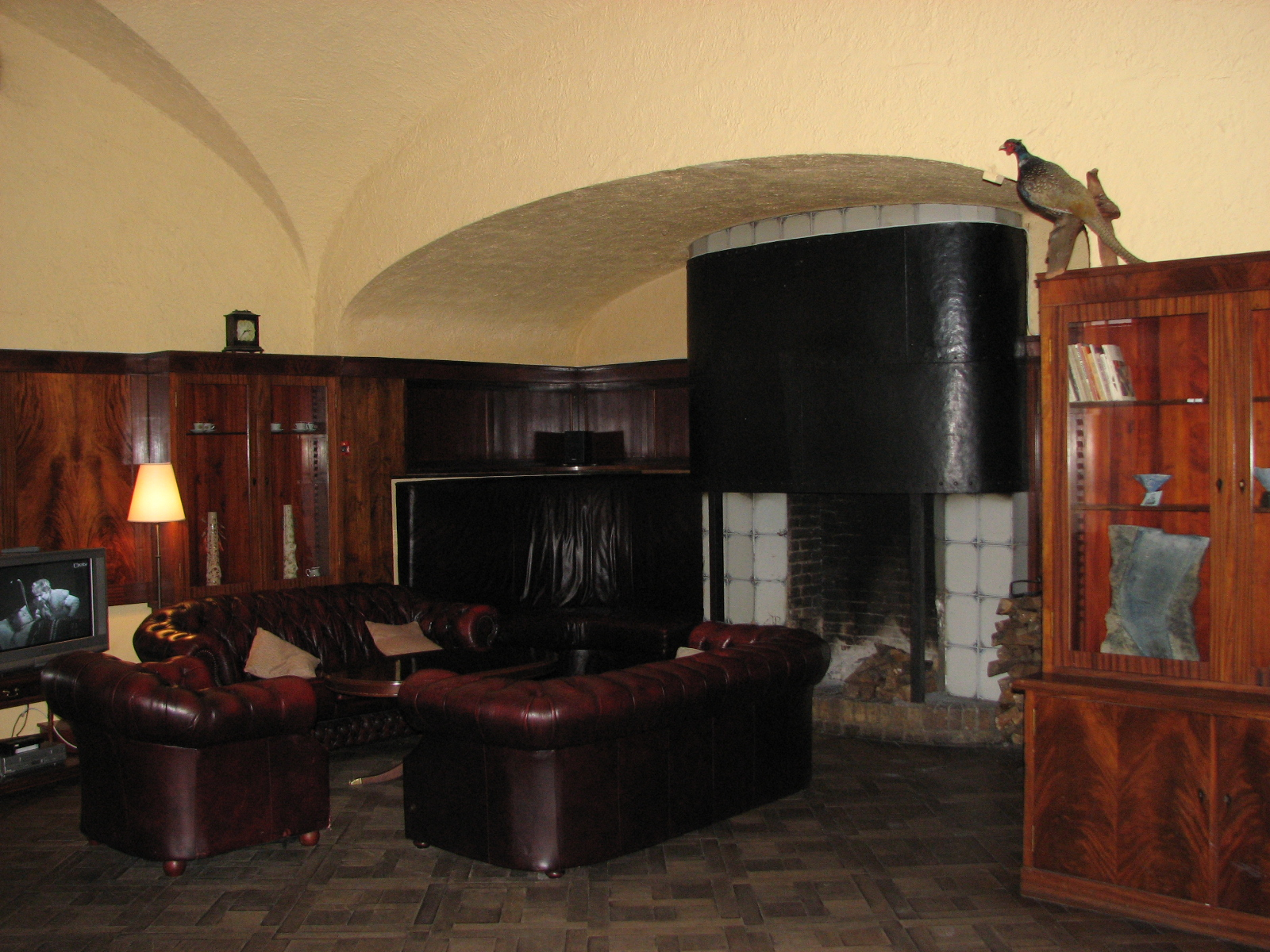
Jahisaal

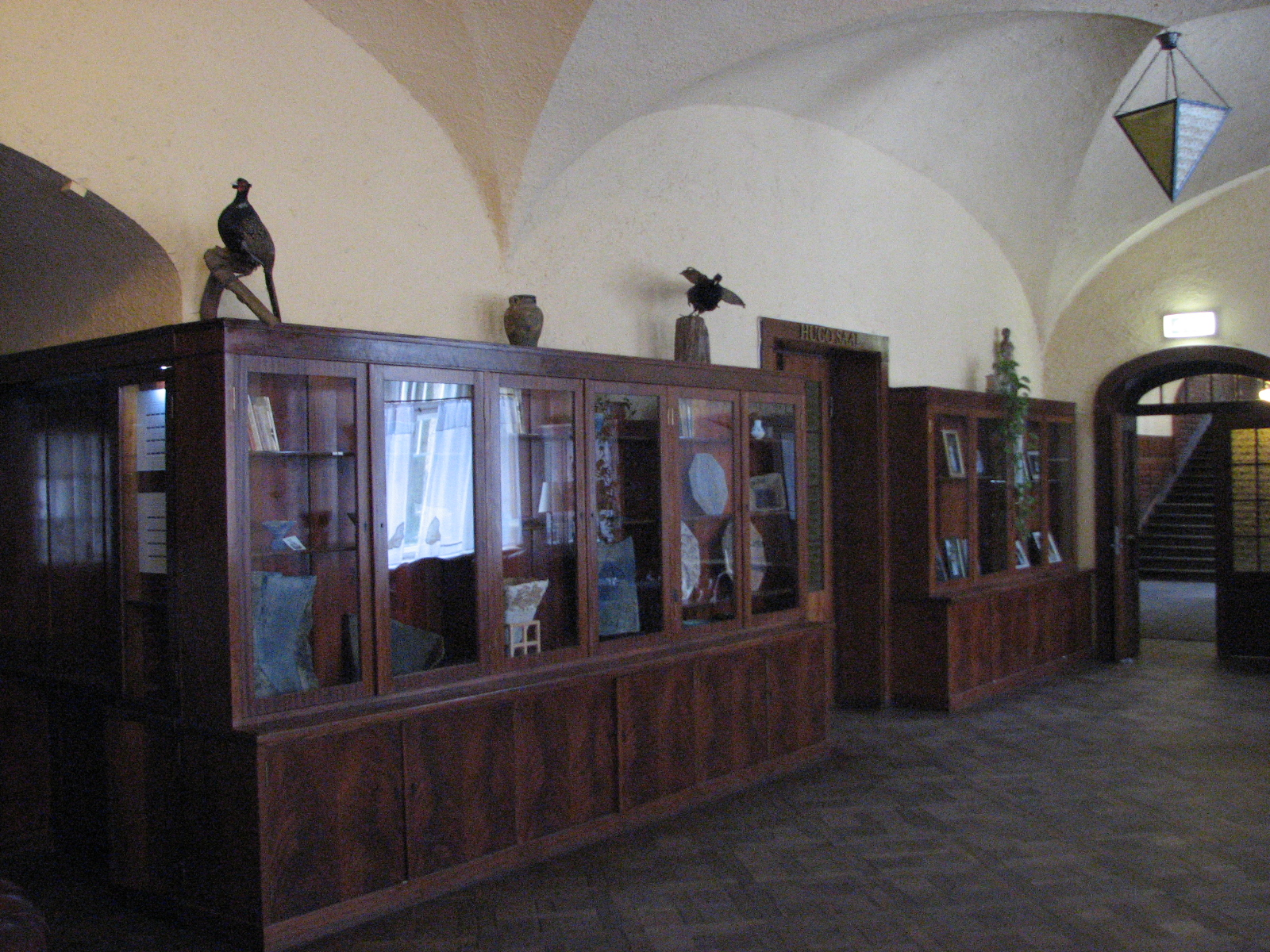
Jahisaal

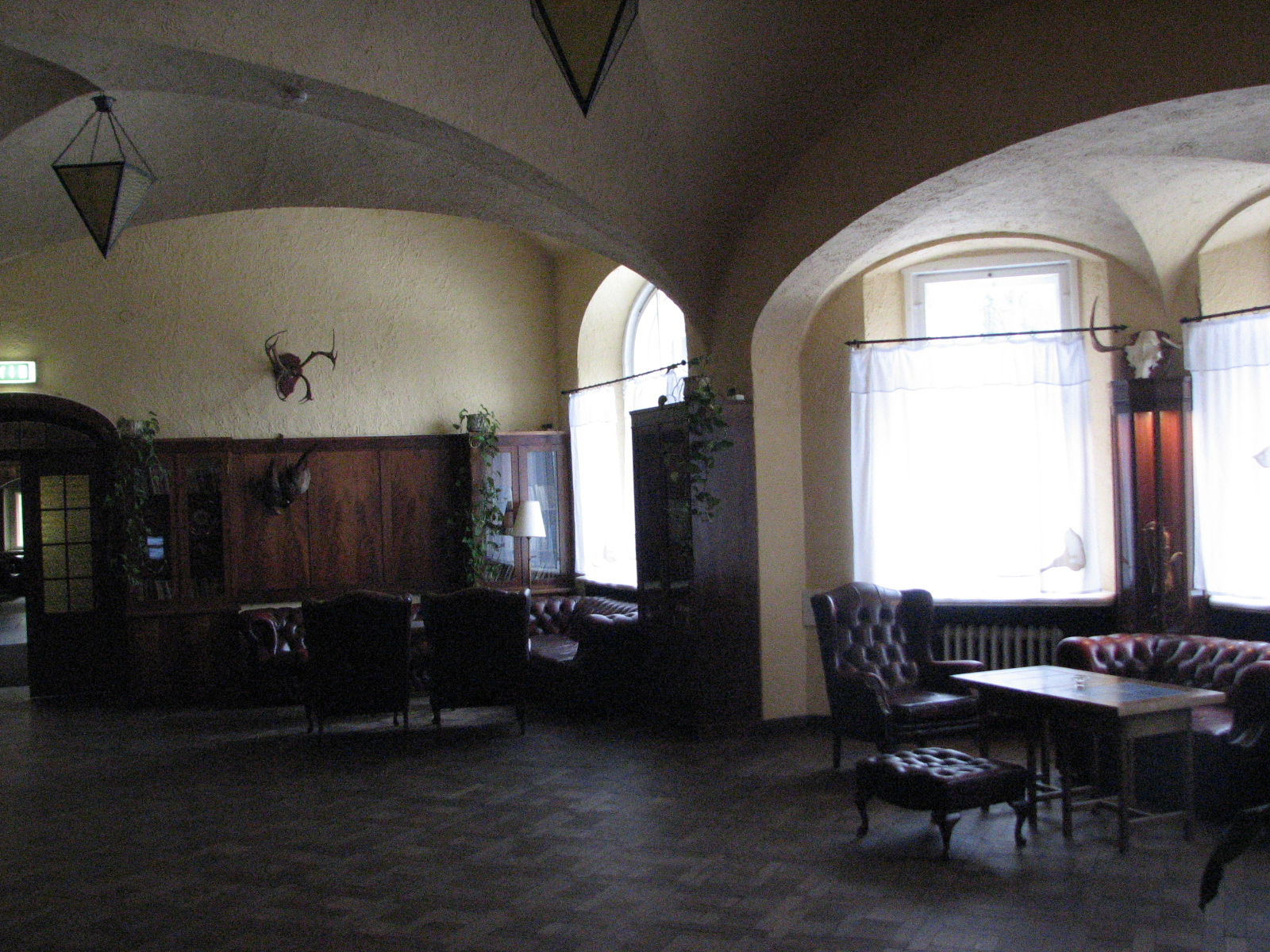
Jahisaal

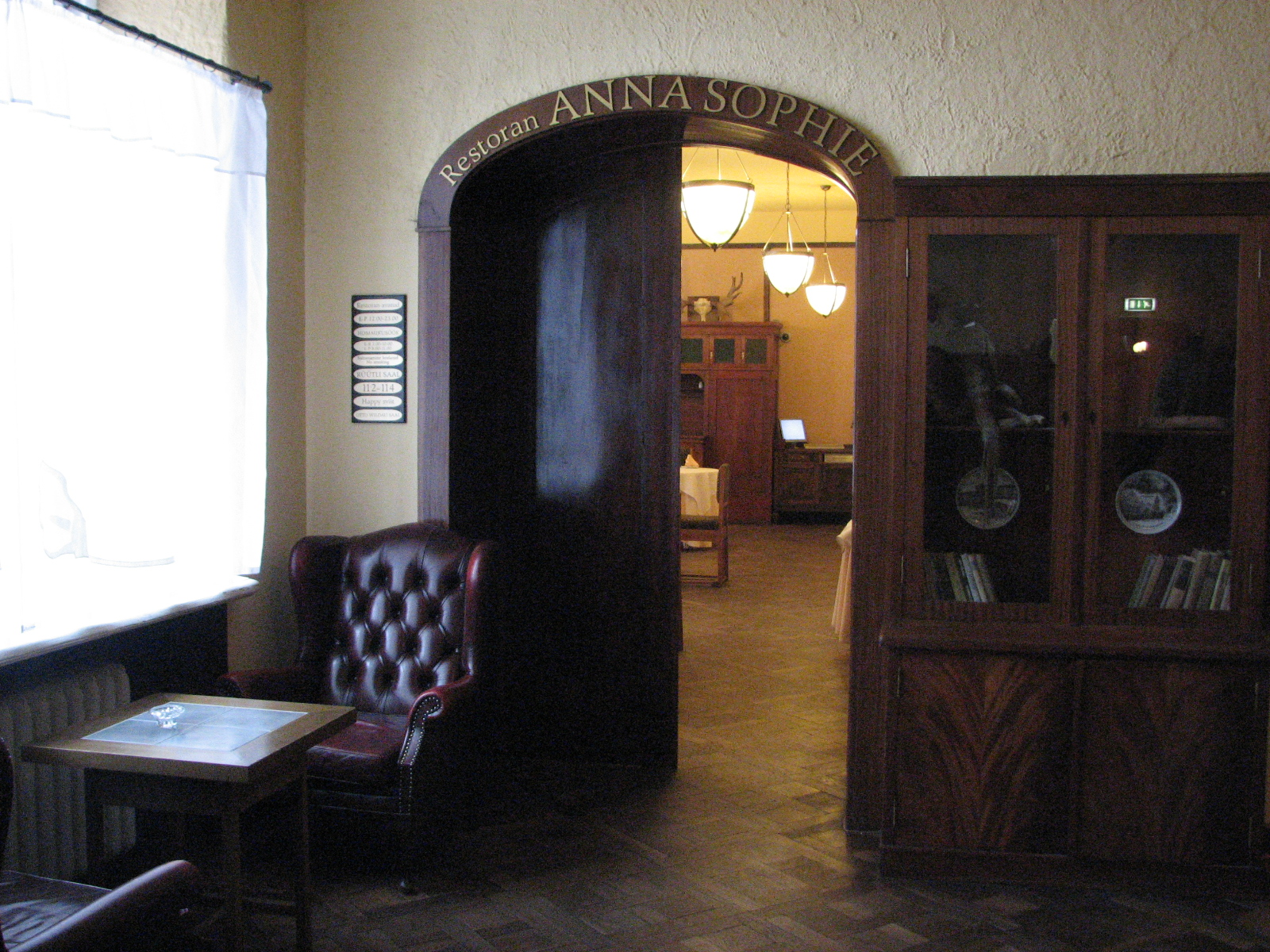
Jahisaal

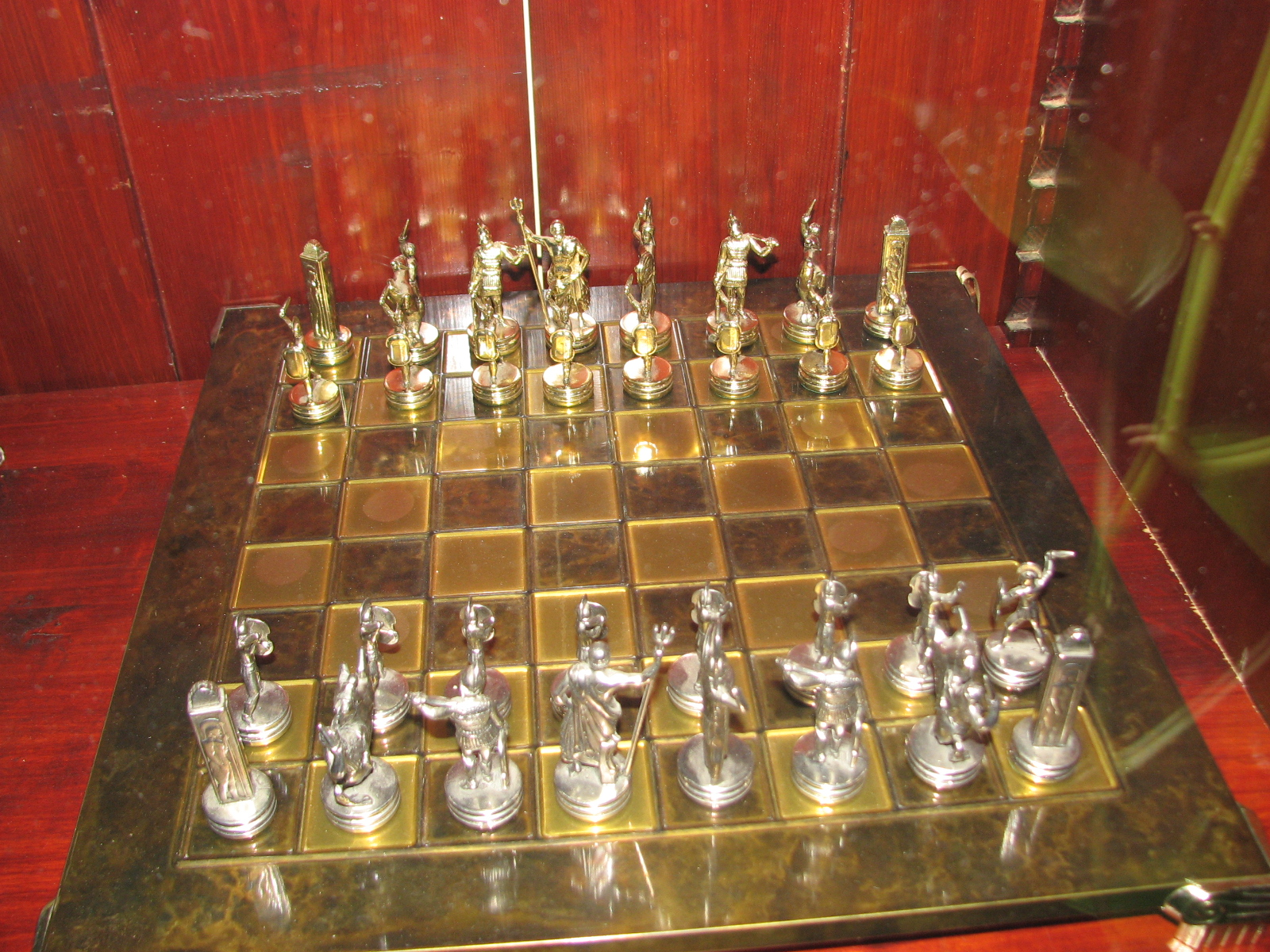
Jahisaal - a chess board in the hall

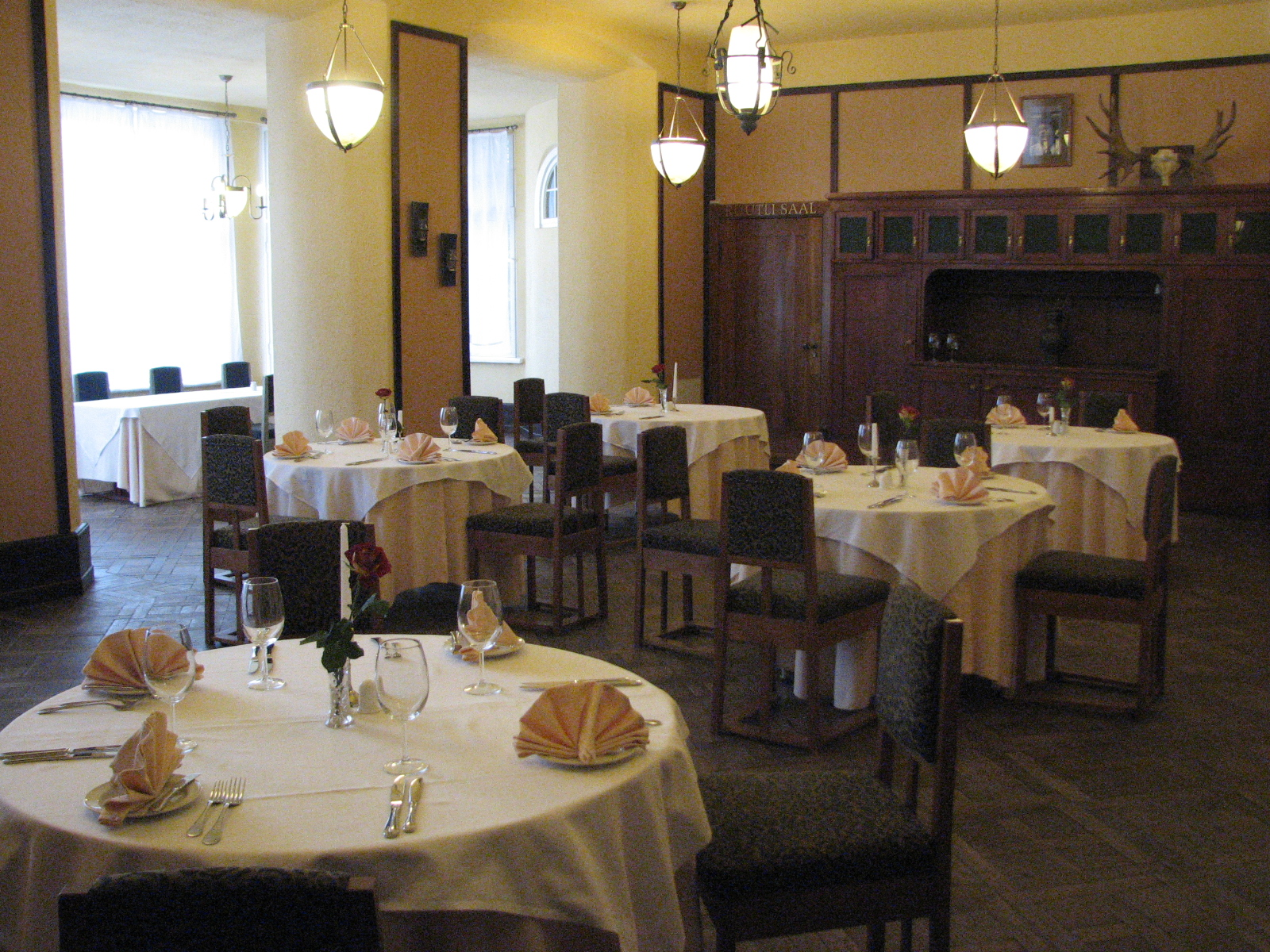
Anna Sophie restaurant

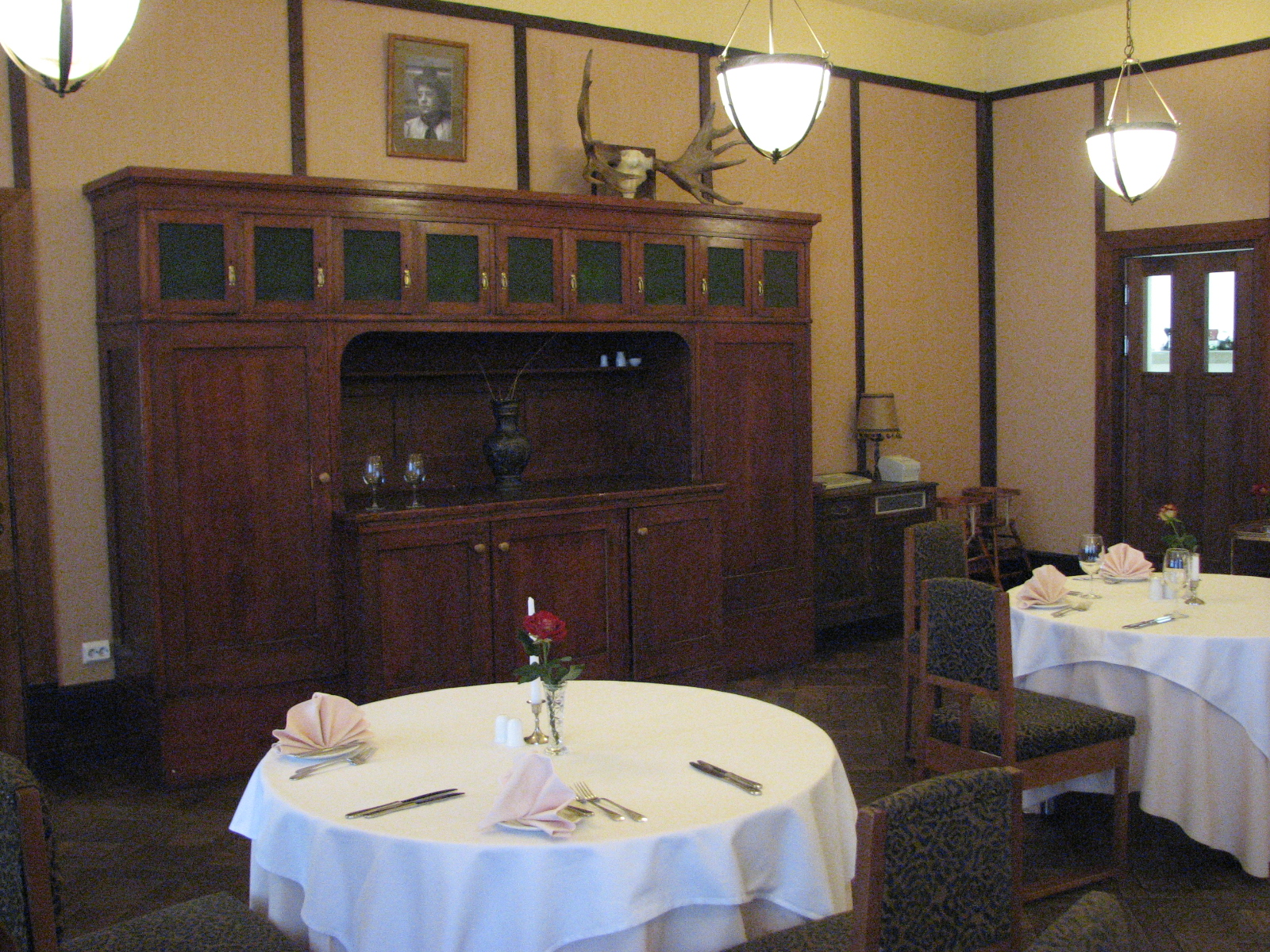
Anna Sophie restaurant

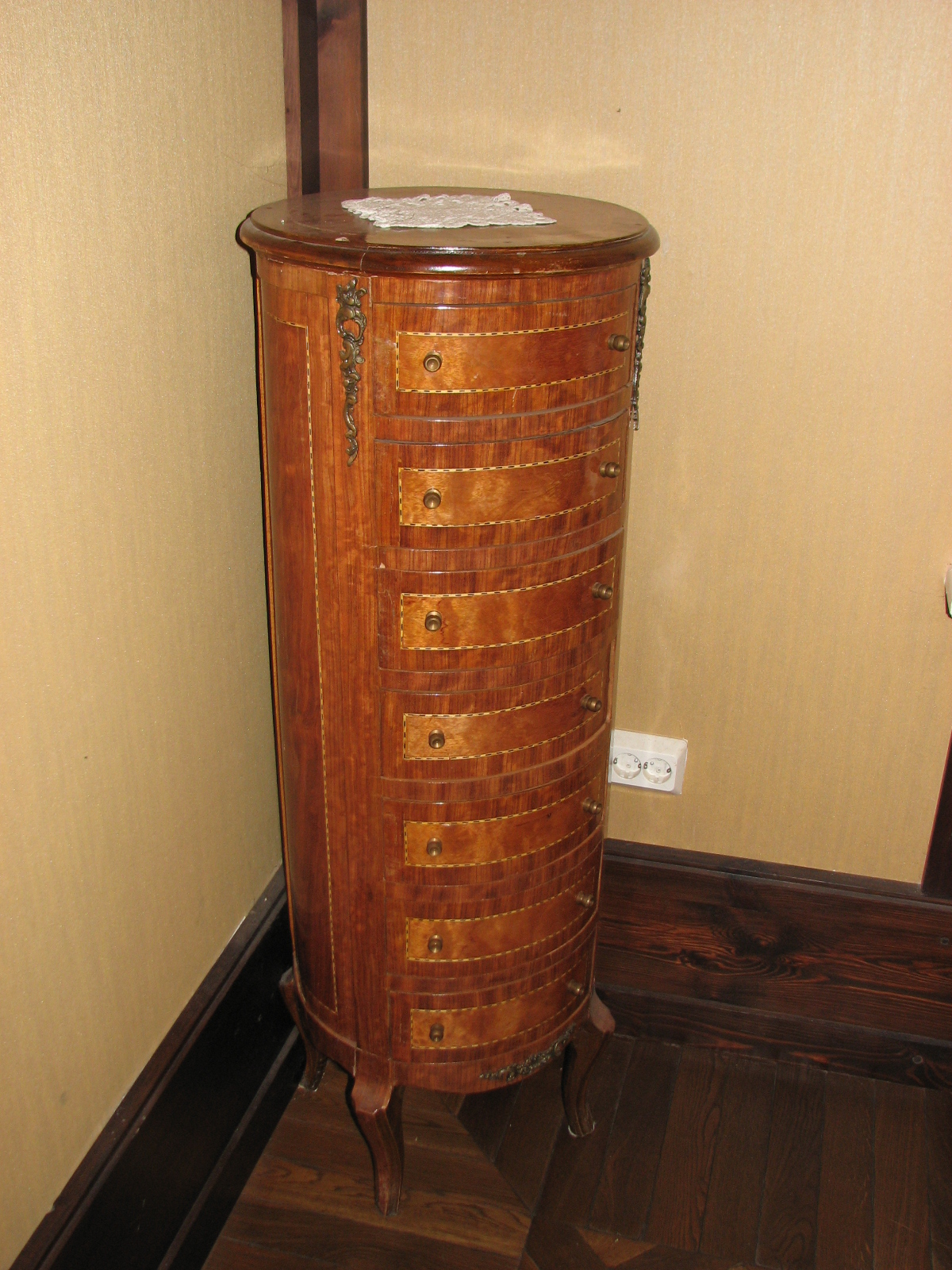
Anna Sophie restaurant

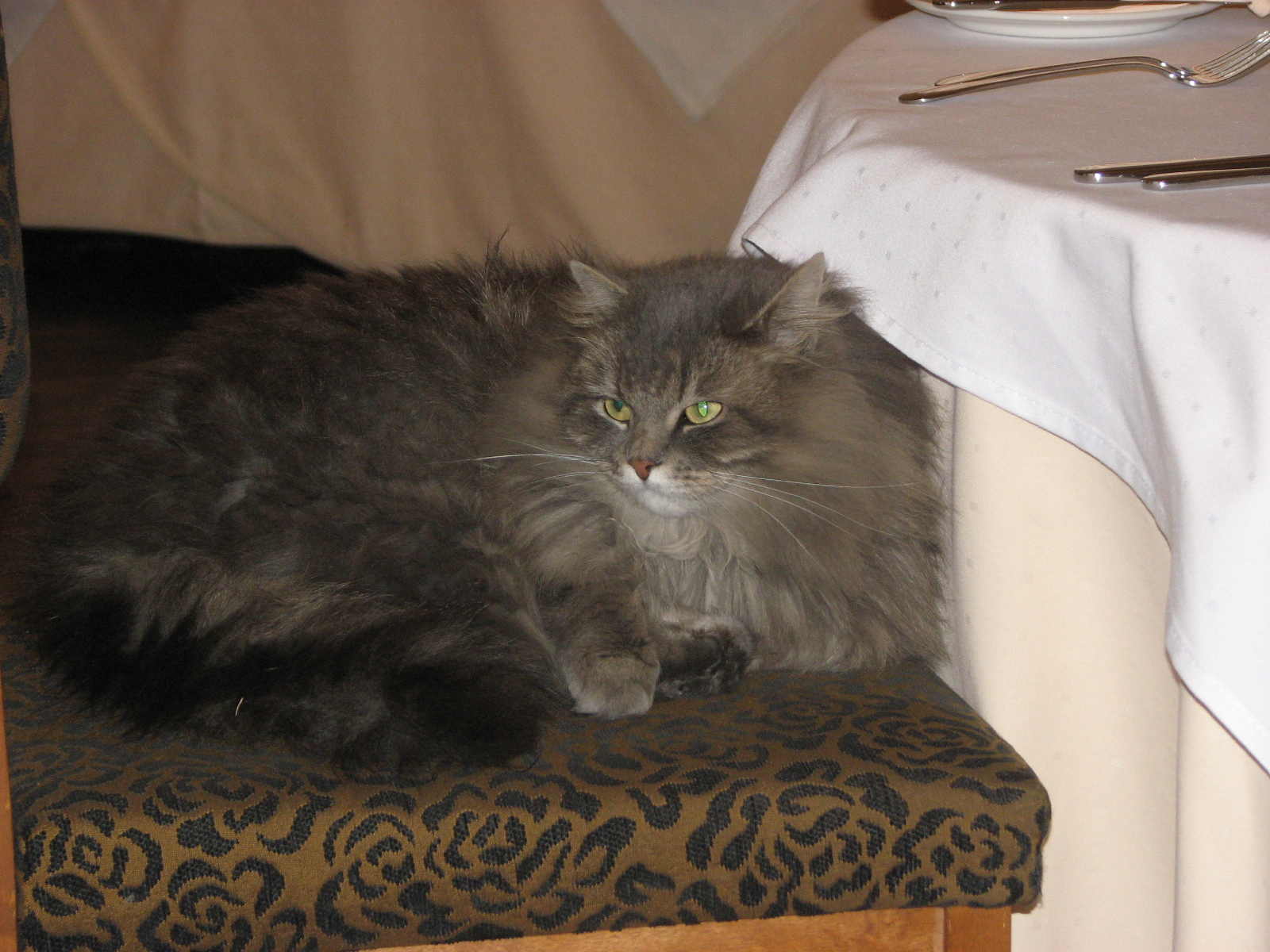
Anna Sophie restaurant - castle cat

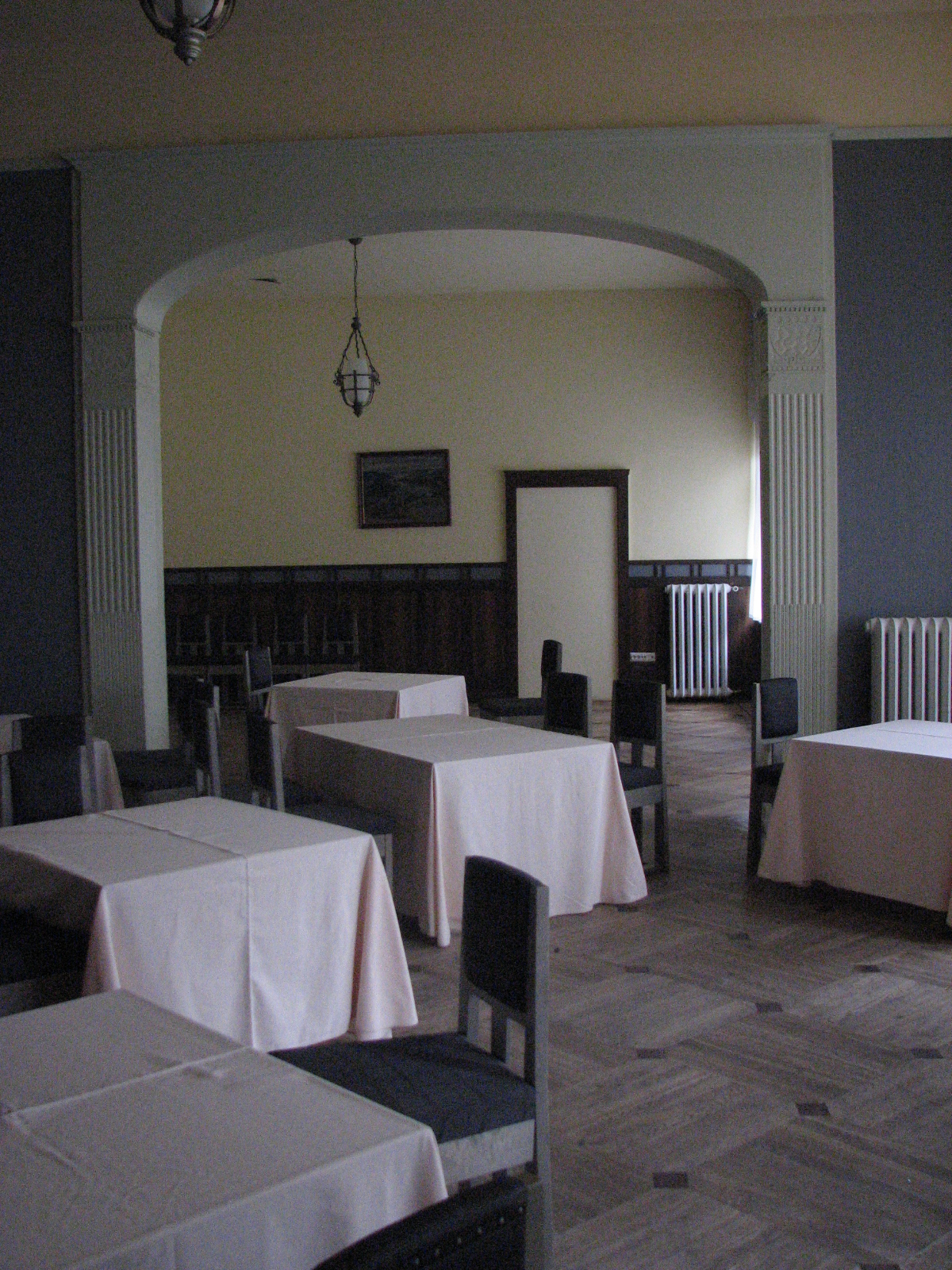
Hugo Saal

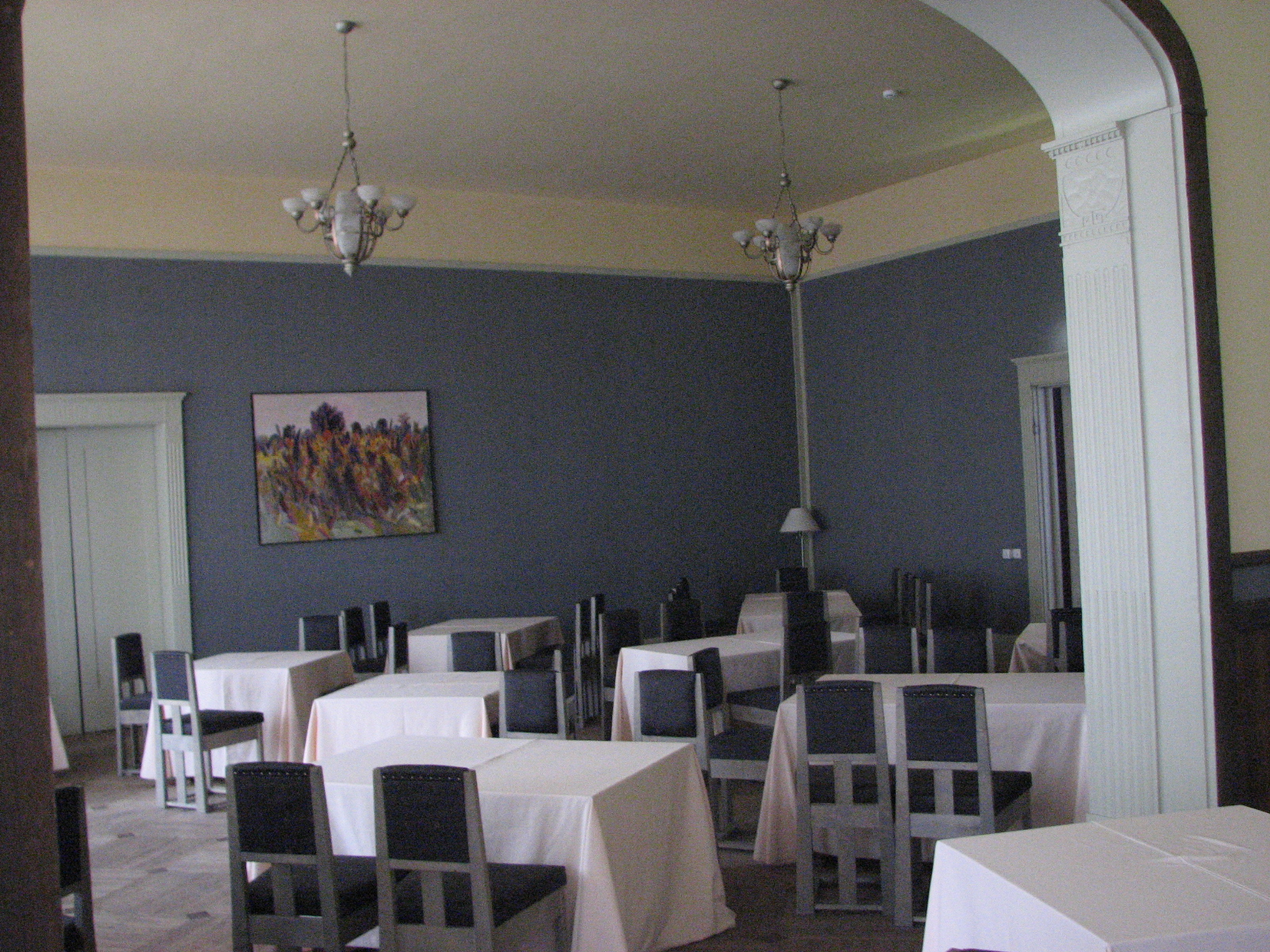
Hugo Saal

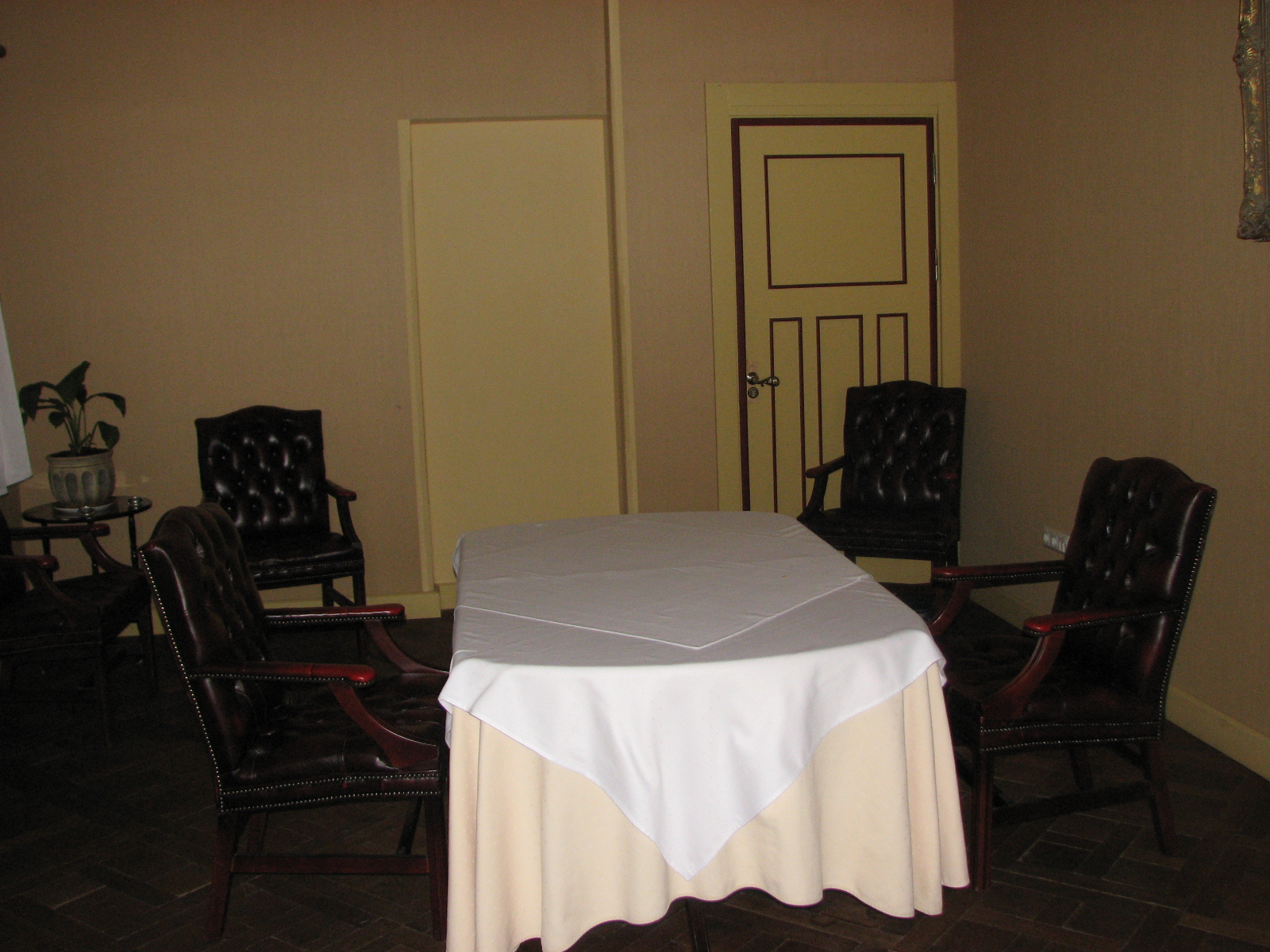
Rüütli Saal

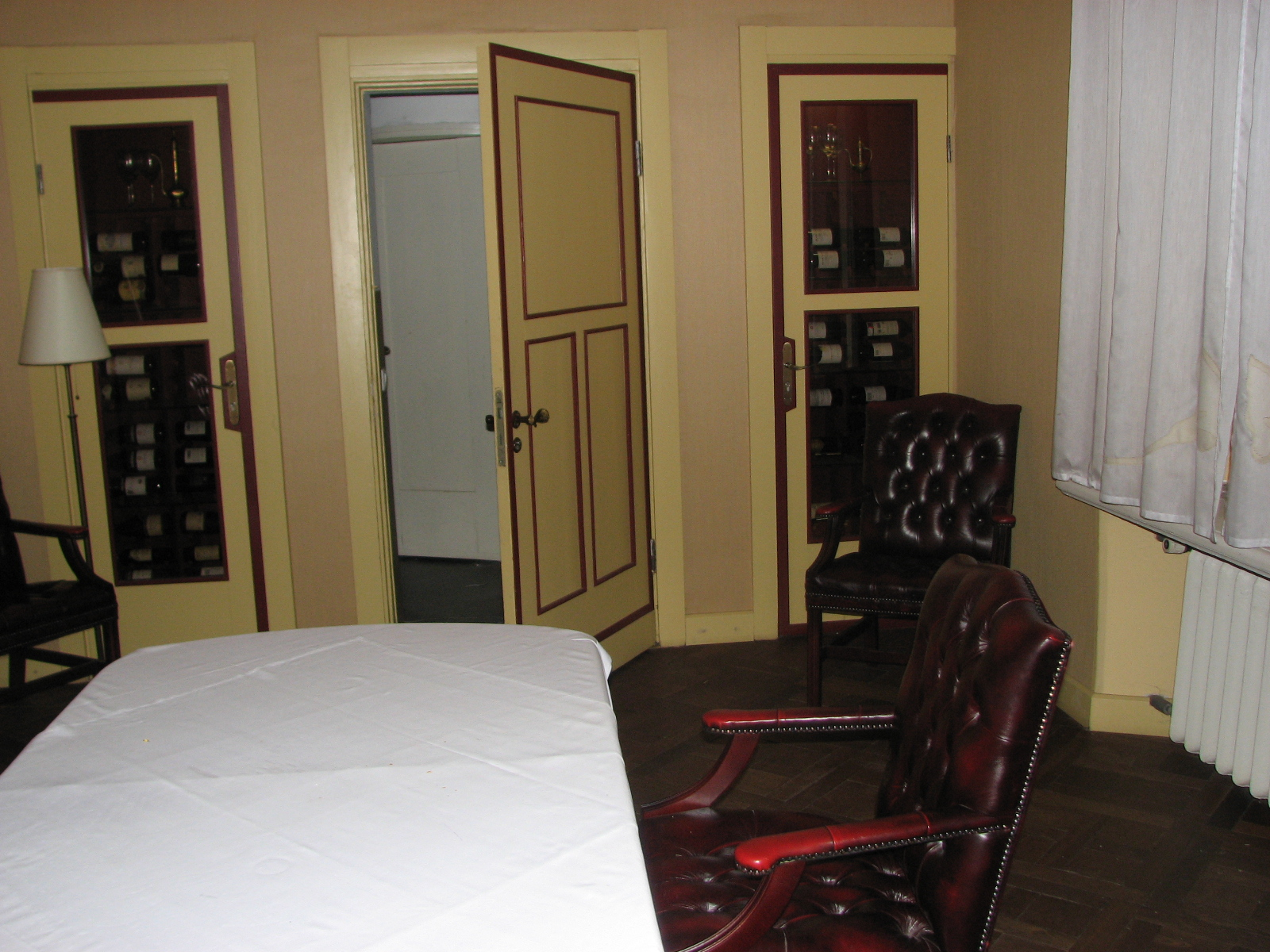
Rüütli Saal

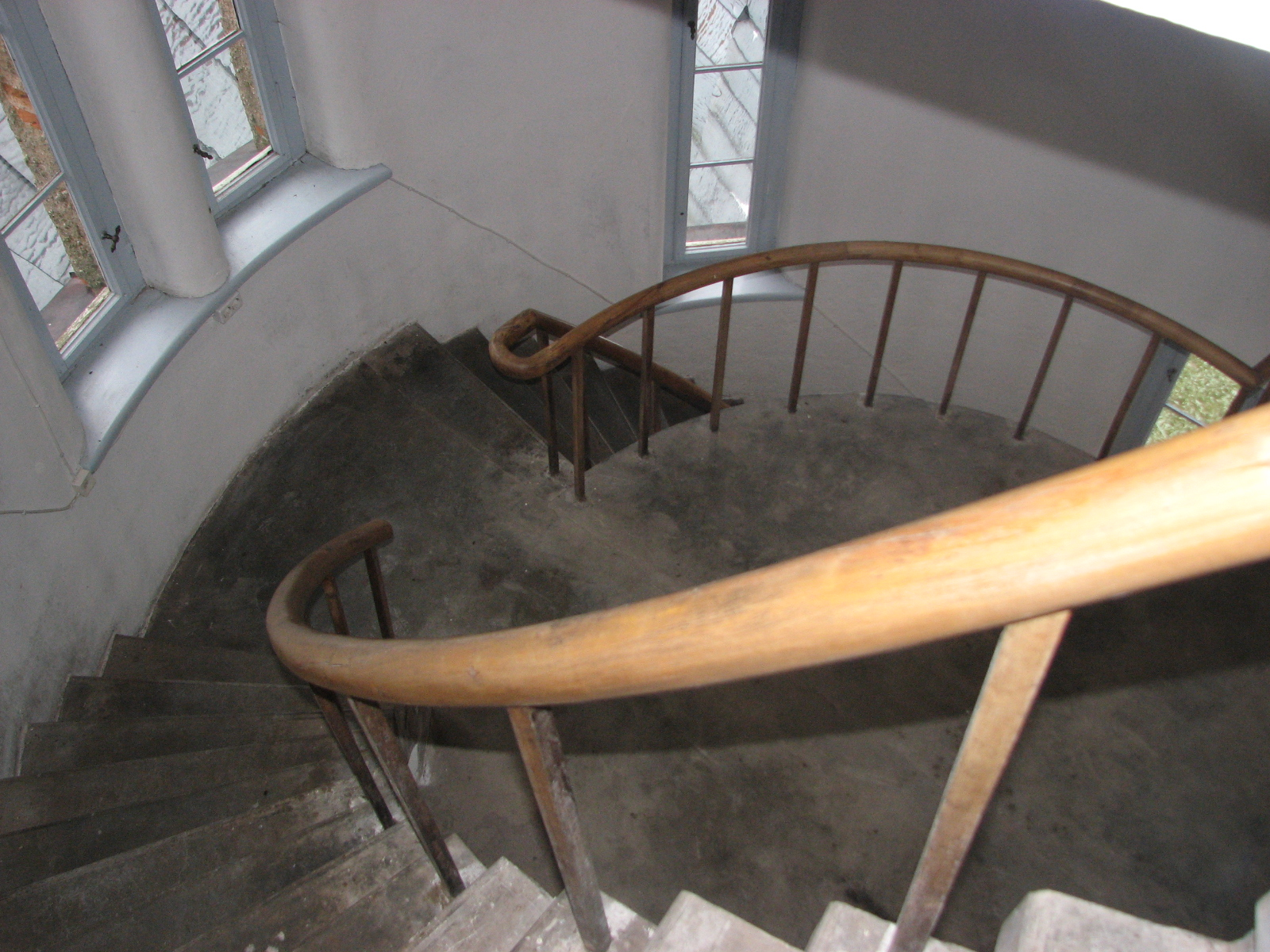
Stairway in the tower

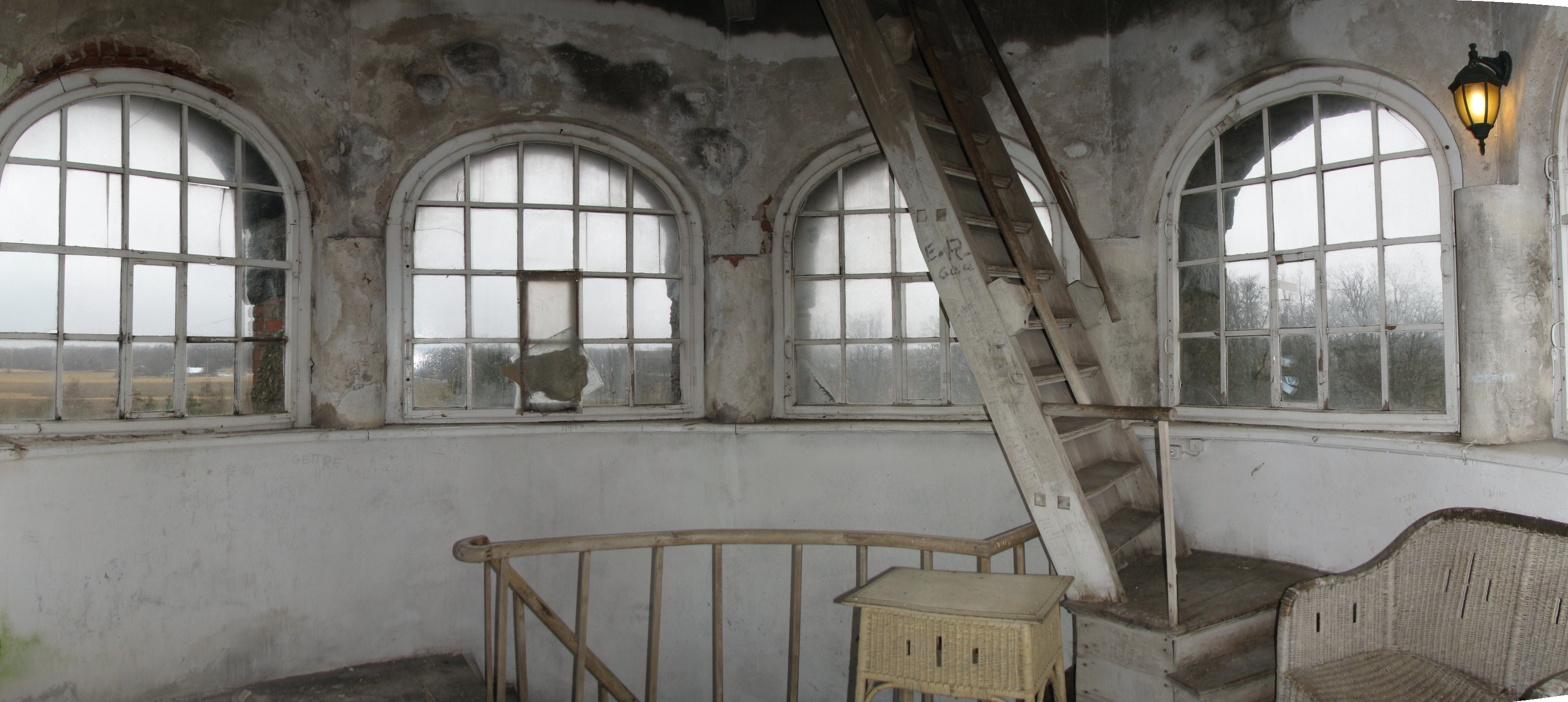
Observation room in the tower

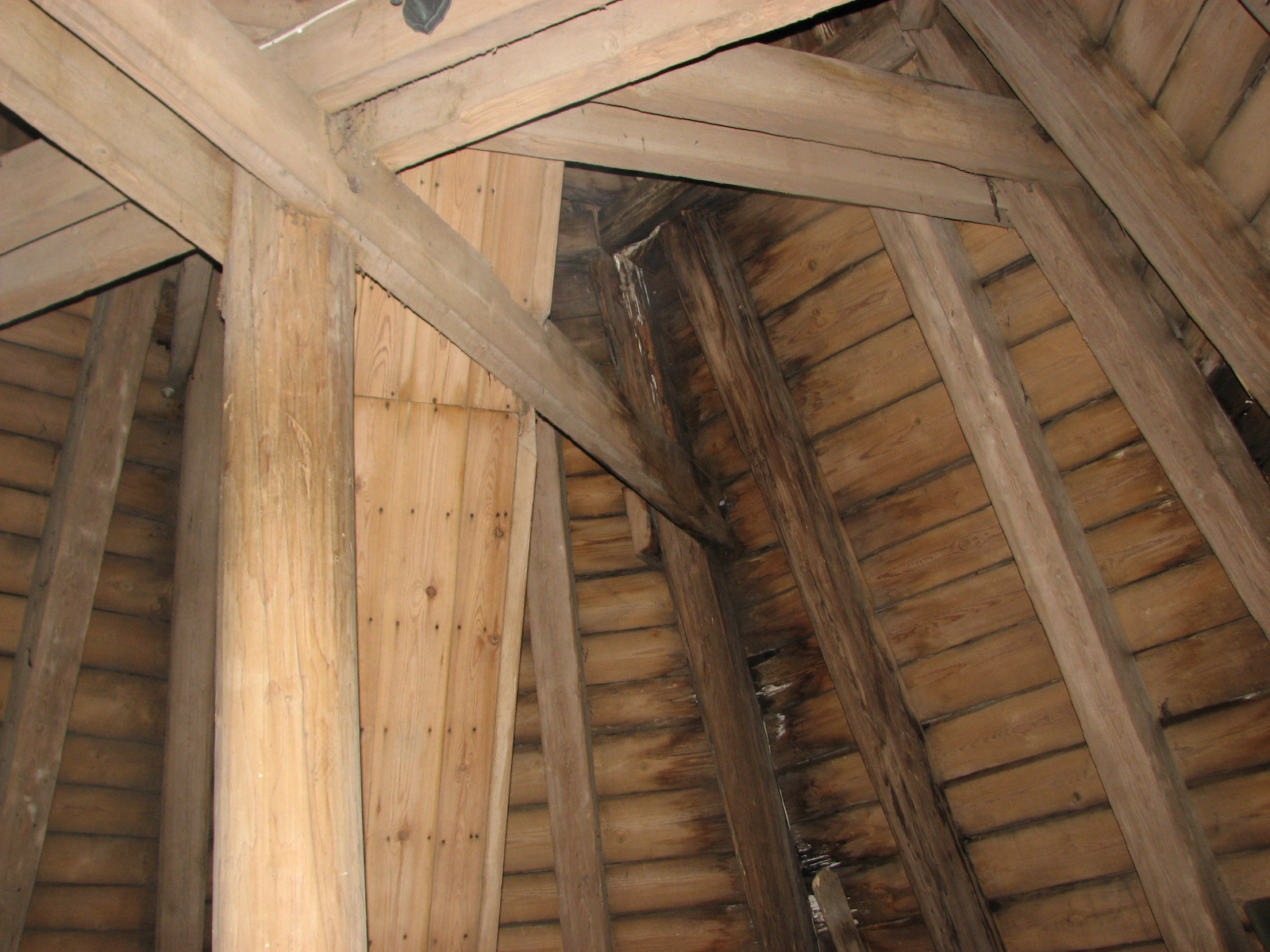
Stairway to top floor of tower from floor below

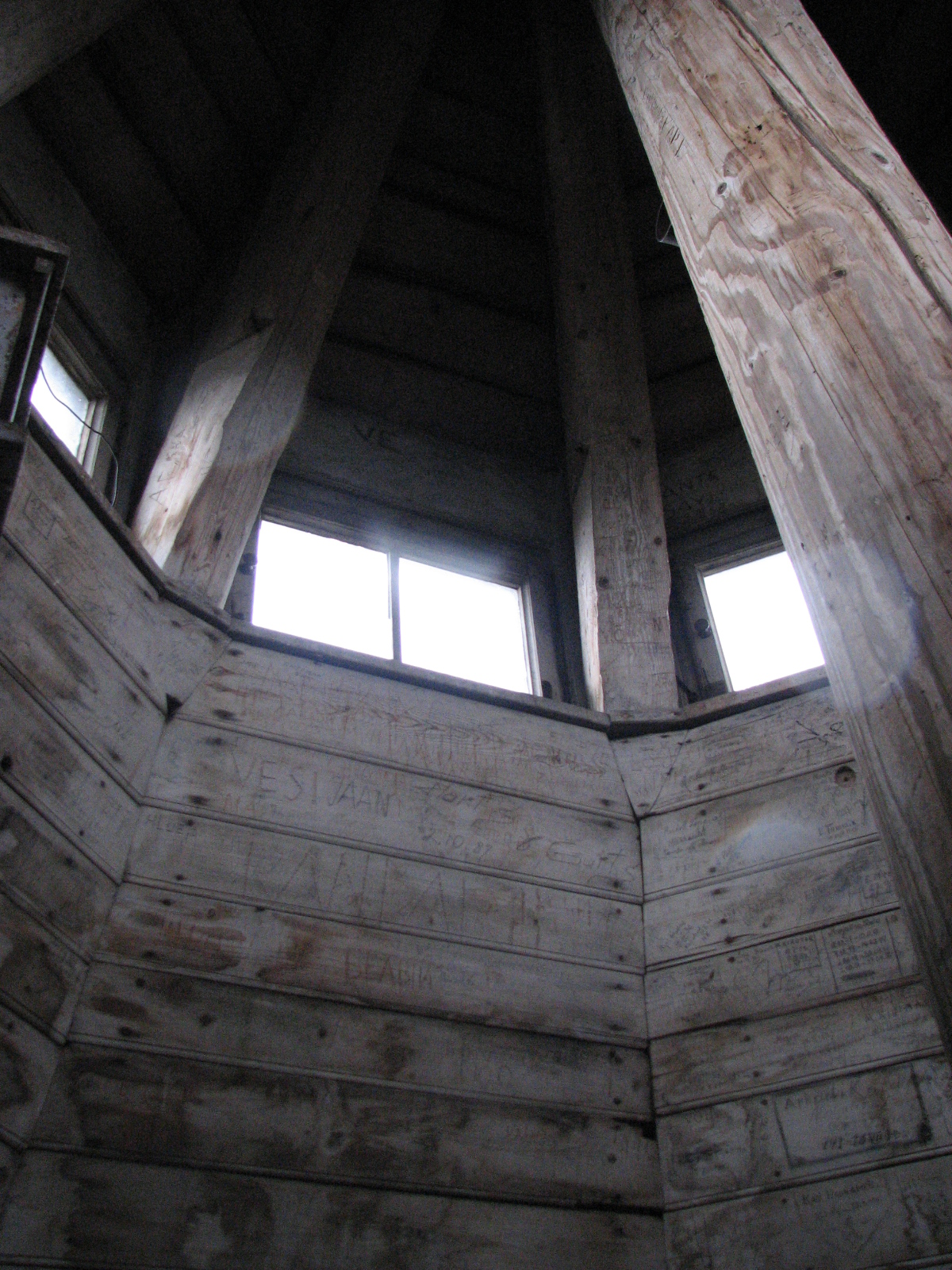
Top floor of tower

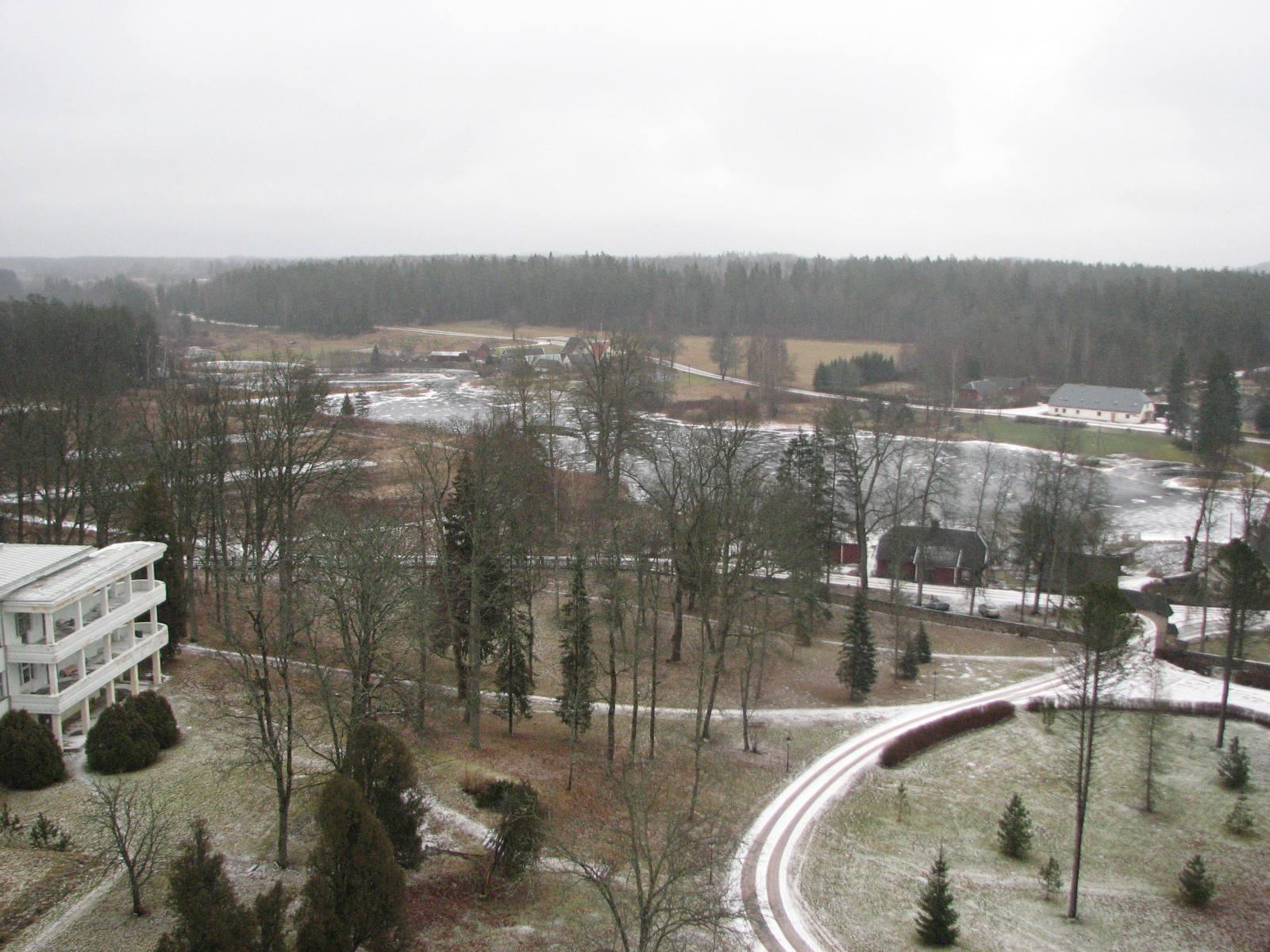
View from top floor of tower

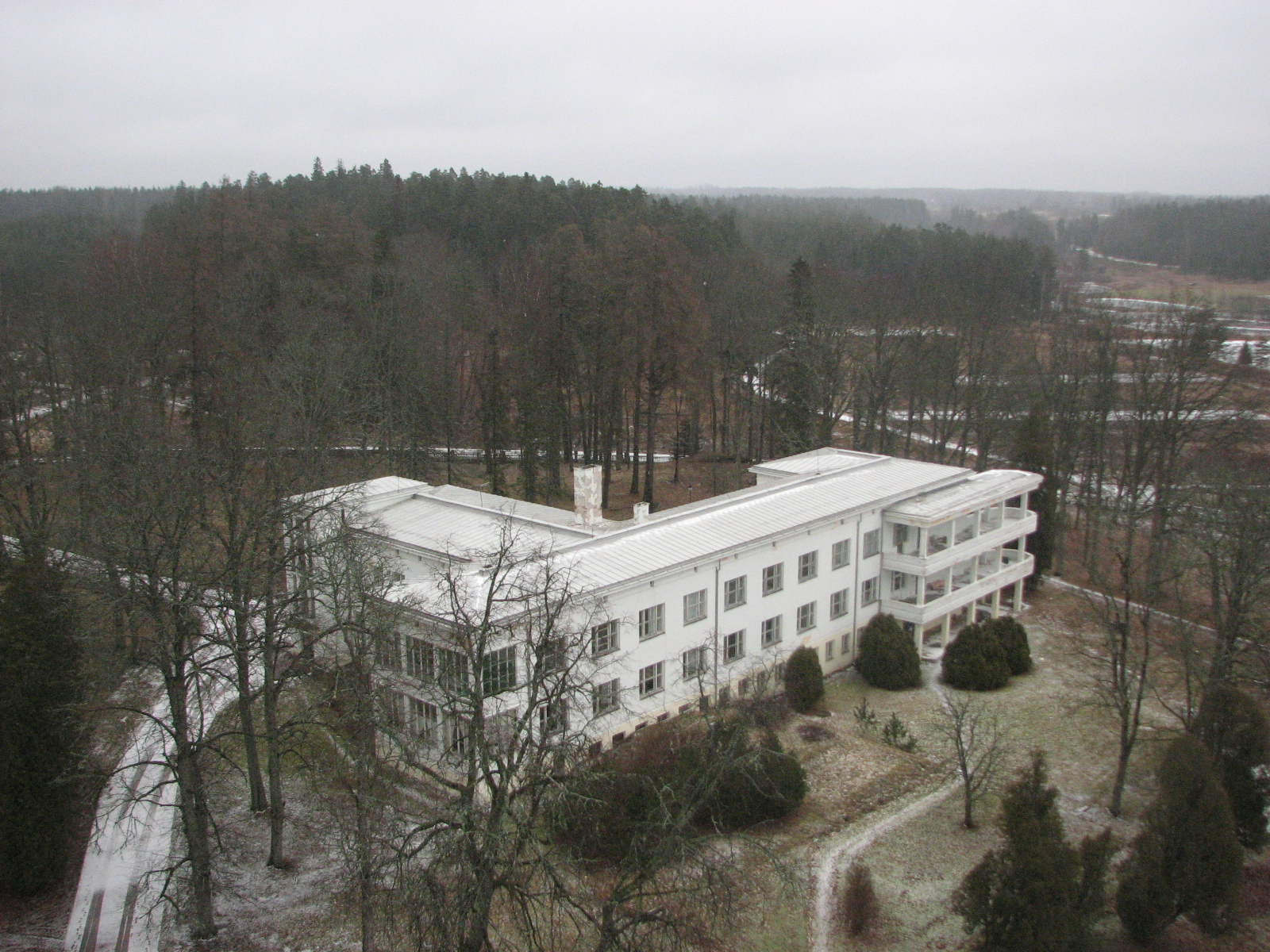
View from top floor of tower

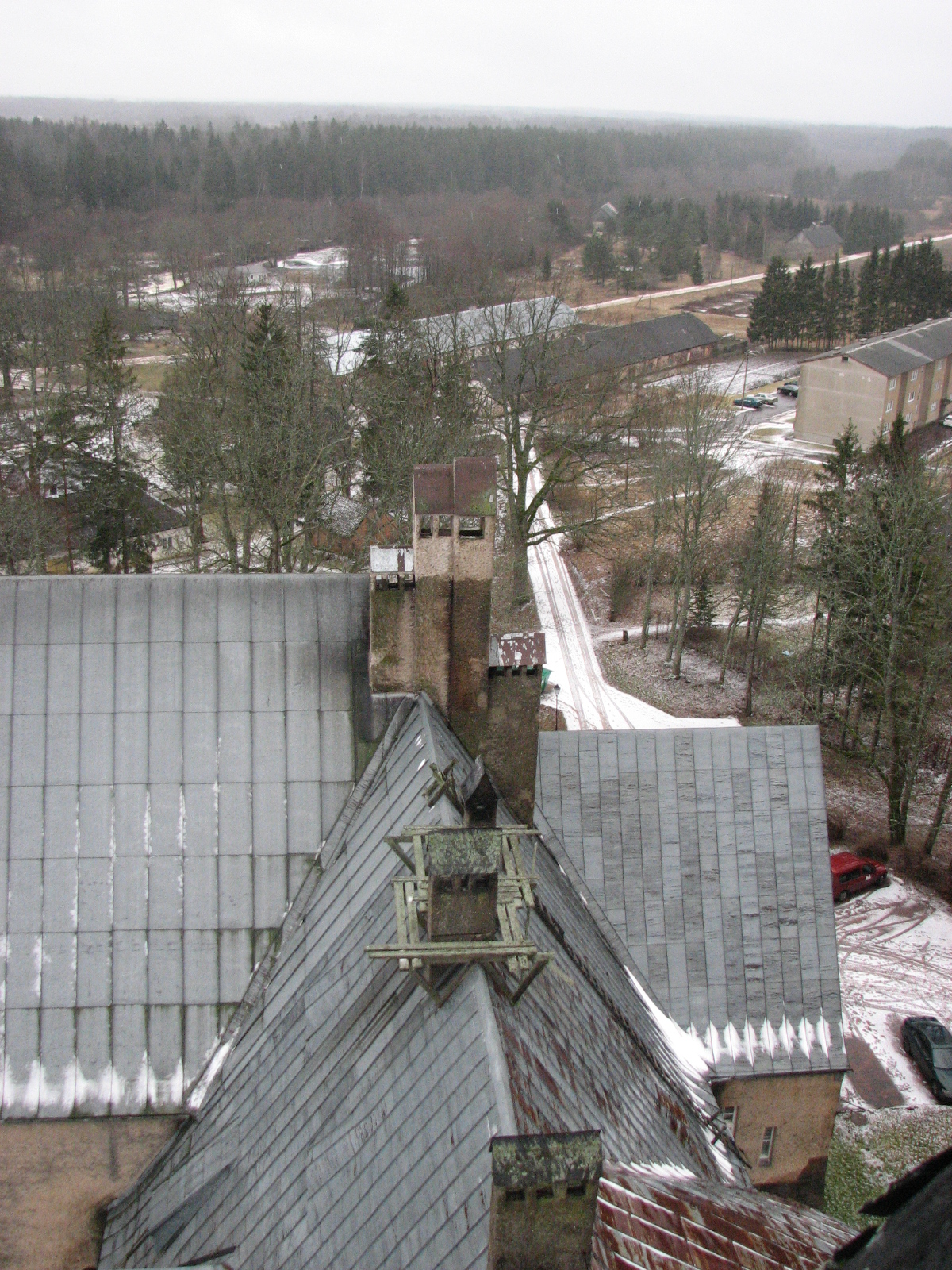
View from top floor of tower

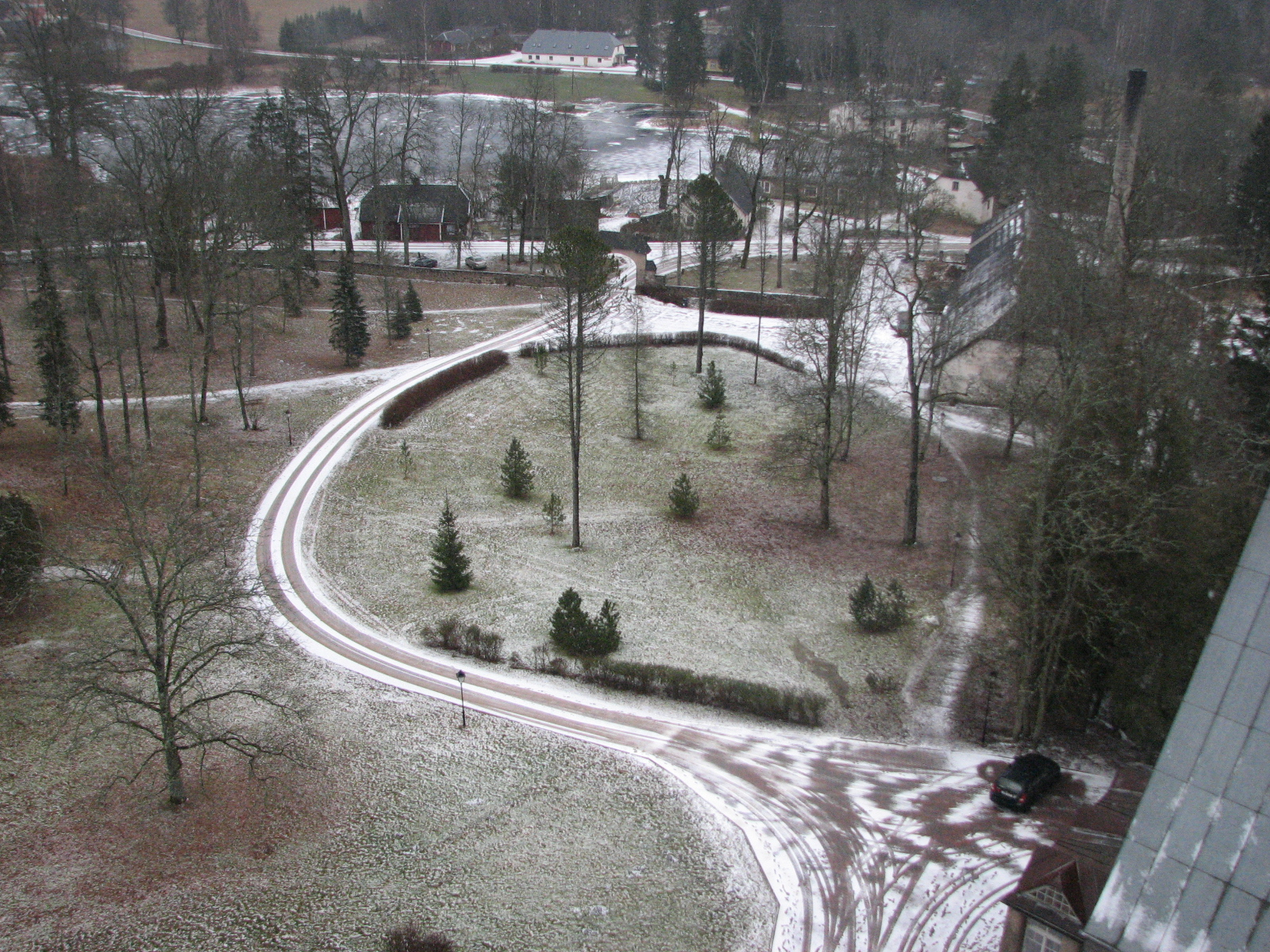
View from top floor of tower
