= Taagepera Church =

Church building in Valga County, Estonia

- Taagepera Kirik
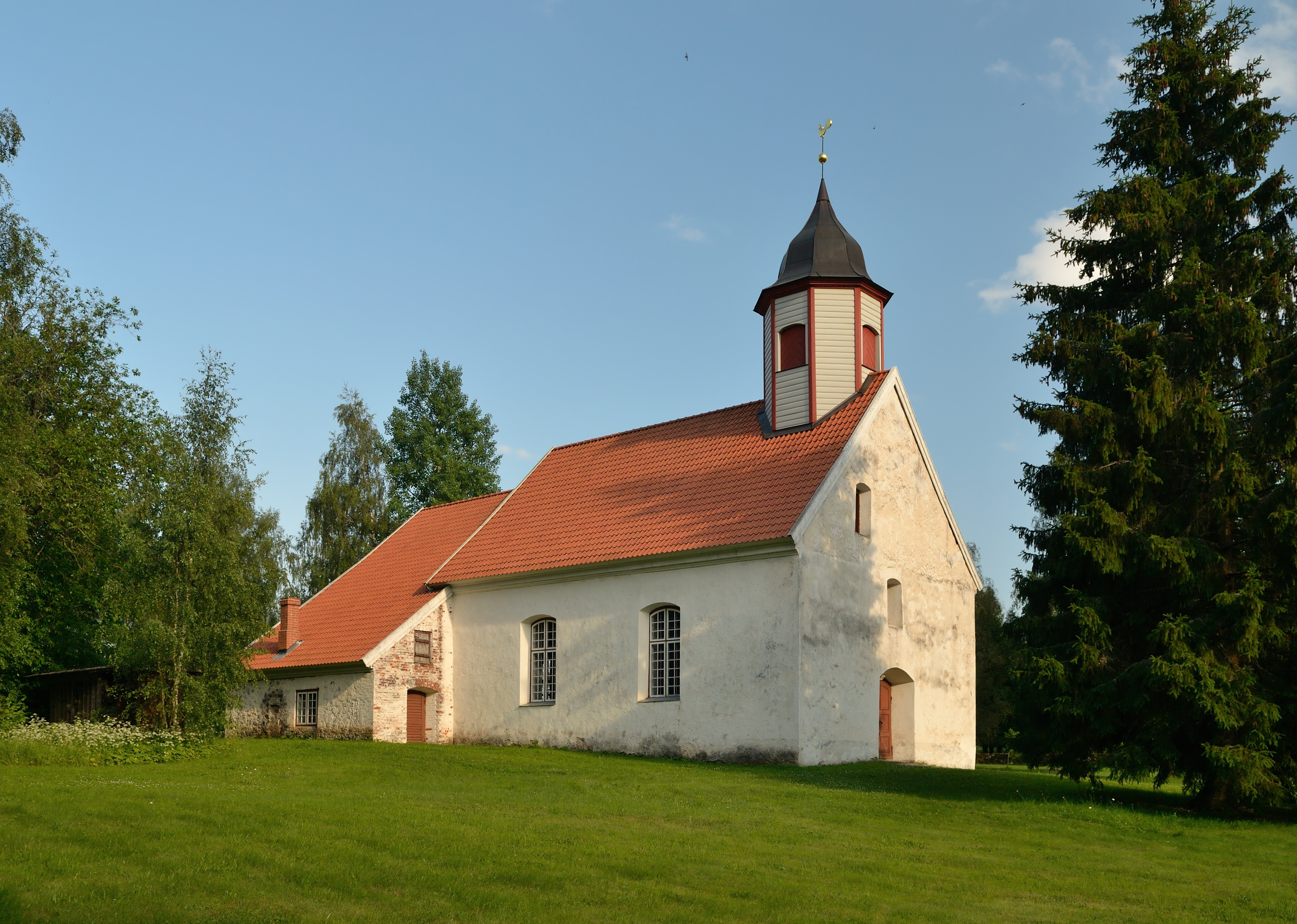

General information
- Location: Taagepera, Estonia
- Coordinates: 58.0135°N 25.6863°E

Taagepera Church (Taagepera's Saint John's church, Estonian: Taagepera Kirik) is a church in the village of Ala, Tõrva Parish, Valga County in southern Estonia. The building, which is made of stone and has a wooden tower, was constructed in 1674. It is located on a small hill overlooking the village of Taagepera and has an associated cemetery. It has an organ built by Ernst Carl Kessler, who made the first organ in Sitka, Alaska.

The building is registered in the Kultuurimälestiste riiklik register (National Register of Cultural Monuments) of Estonia, effective 27 September 1999.

== Sources ==
- Talvik, Merje (8 October 2008). "Taagepera kirik sai uue katuse, torni ja kuke" [The Taagepera Church received a new roof, a tower and a kuke]. Eesti Kirk (in Estonian).
- "Taagepera kiriku uuendamine algab kevadel" [The Taageper's Church will be renewed in the spring]. Eesti Kirk (in Estonian). 20 March 2007.
- "Taagepera kirik sai heade annetajate toel sepistatud küünla-aluse" [The Taagepera Church received a forged candle base with the help of the best donors]. Maaleht. 8 June 2013.
