= Aleksandrs Vanags (architect) =

Latvian architect

- Born: 5 March 1873; Liezēre parish, Russian Empire (now Latvia)
- Died: 19 March 1919 (aged 46); Rīga, Latvian Socialist Soviet Republic
- Known for: Architecture
- Movement: Art Nouveau
- Patrons: Konstantīns Pēkšēns

Aleksandrs Vanags (5 March 1873 – 19 March 1919) was a Latvian architect.

Vanags studied civil engineering between 1891 and 1899 and then pursued studies in architecture at Riga Technical Institute (today Riga Technical University). He never finished his studies in architecture but secured a permit to run a building practice in 1902. He worked in the office of Konstantīns Pēkšēns between 1895 and 1905 and then established his own firm. Vanags designed a number of churches in Riga and approximately 70 multi-storey apartment buildings in the city before World War I, most of which are in a National romantic style of Art Nouveau architecture. During World War I, he worked for the road construction department of the Imperial Russian army but during the German occupation of Riga he helped organise an exhibition in Berlin about Latvian art (in 1918). He returned to Riga in 1919 and worked with the building department of the city during the Communist occupation. He was a victim of the so called Red Terror because he was arrested and executed by firing squad for "counterrevolutionary activities".

== Examples of buildings by Aleksandrs Vanags ==
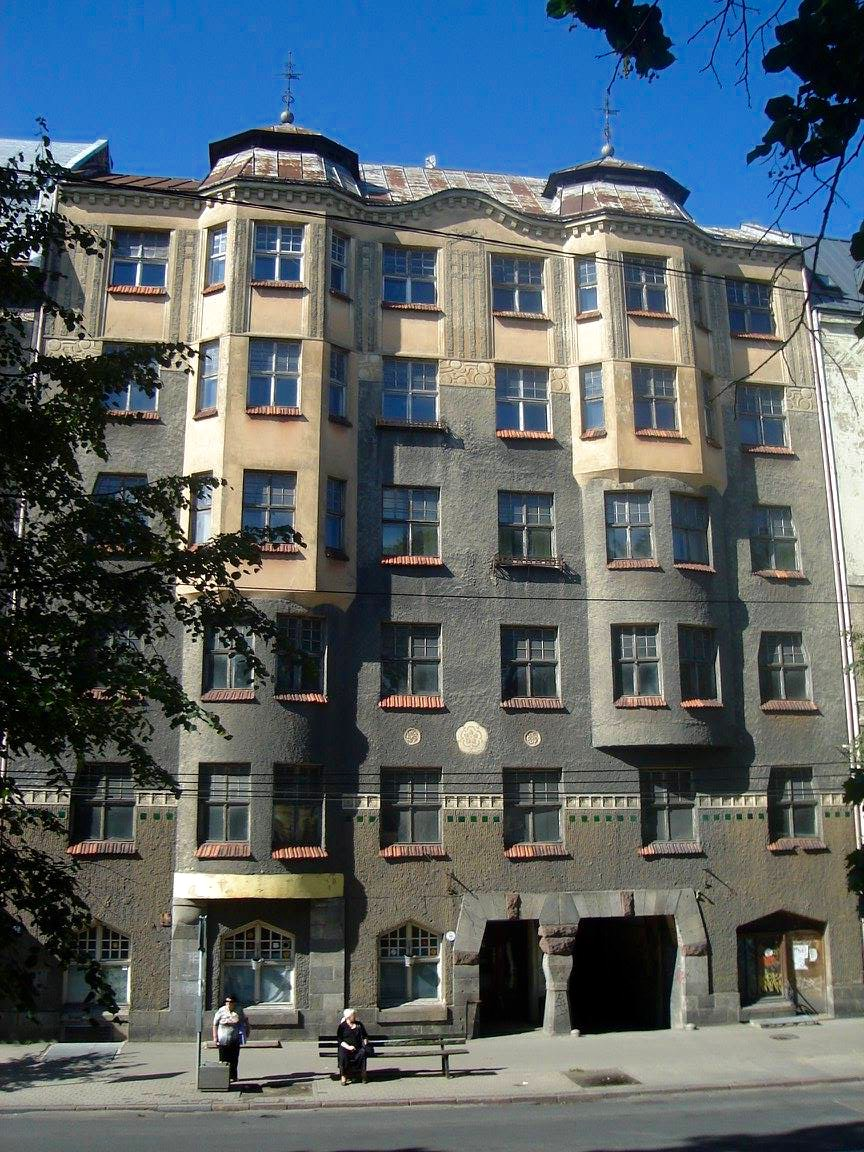
Building by Aleksandrs Vanags (together with Paul Kampe) on Krišjāņa Valdemāra iela 69, Riga

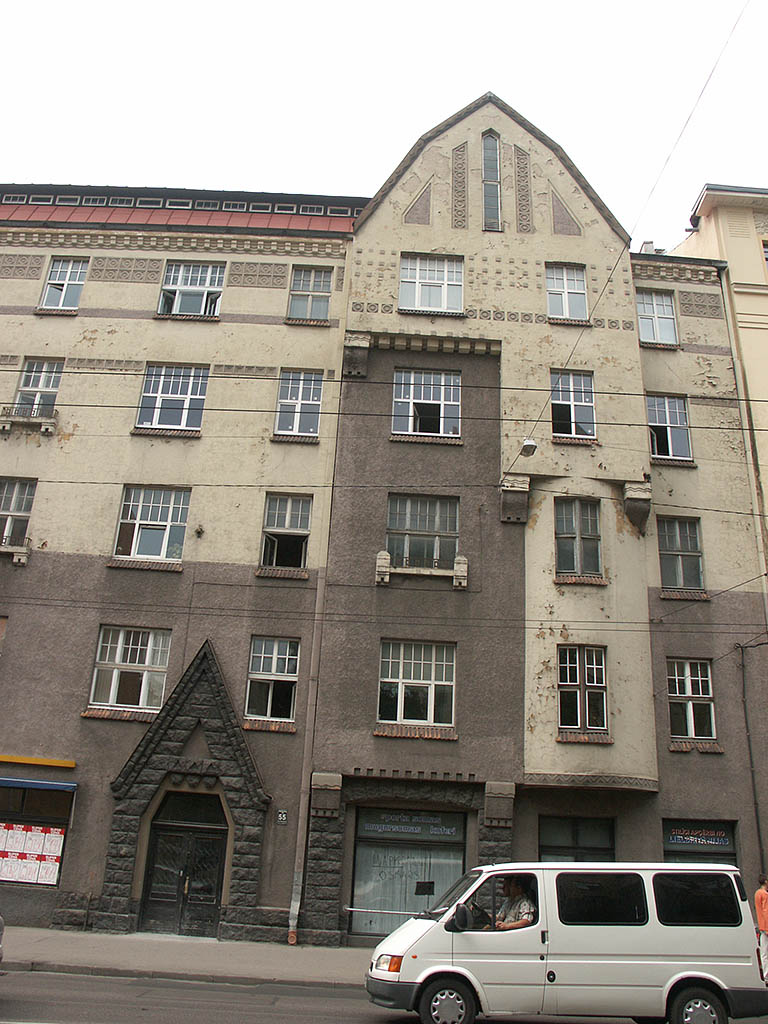
Building by Aleksandrs Vanags (together with Paul Kampe) on Aleksandra Čaka iela 55, Riga

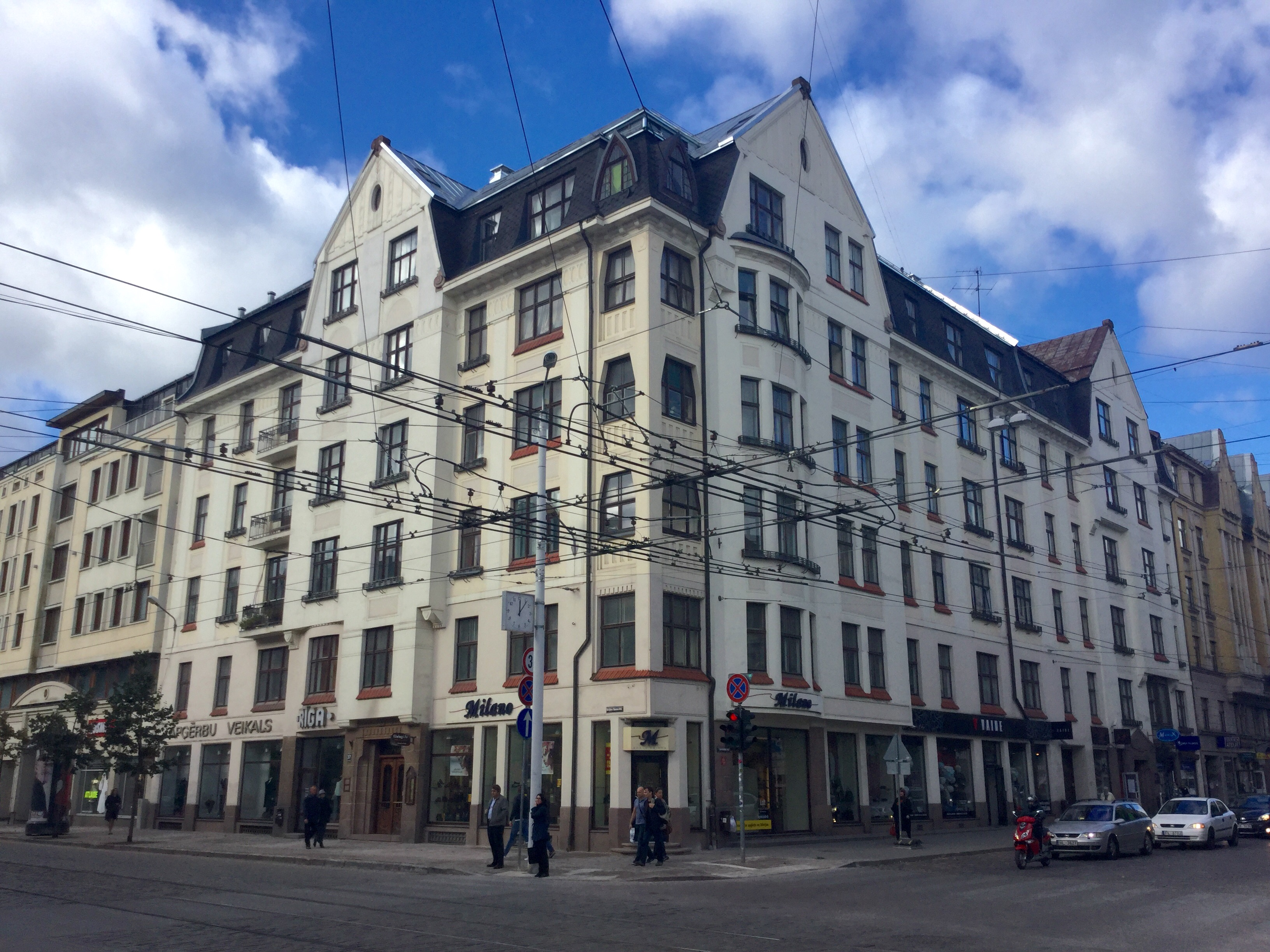
Building by Aleksandrs Vanags on Krišjāņa Barona iela 37, Riga

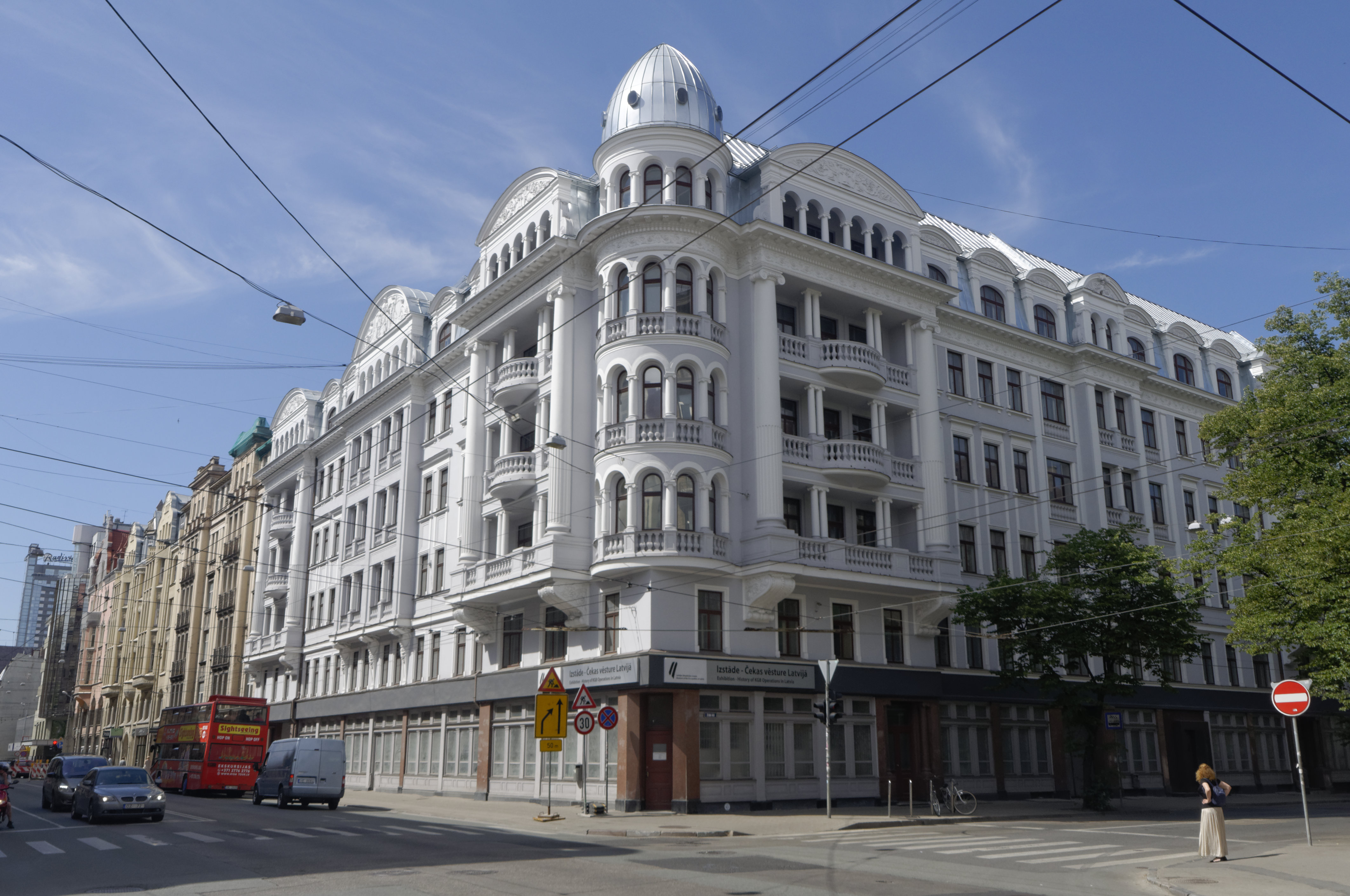
Building on Brīvības str. 58/61. So called Corner house.

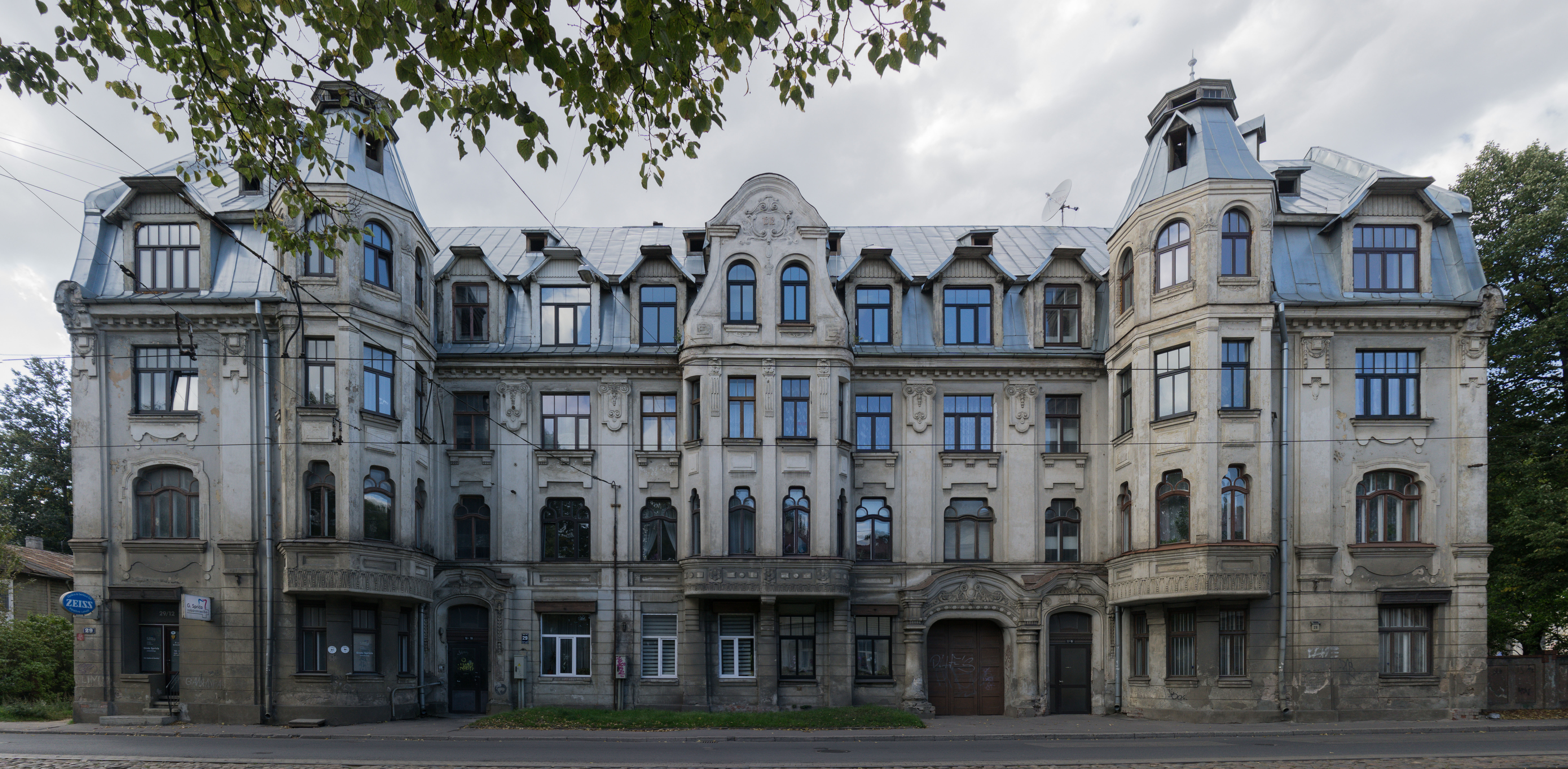
Residential building on the Slokas street 29/1, Riga. (1911).
