= Museum of the Occupation of Latvia =

Museum in Riga, Latvia

Coordinates: 56.947093°N 24.106364°E

- Latvijas Okupācijas muzejs

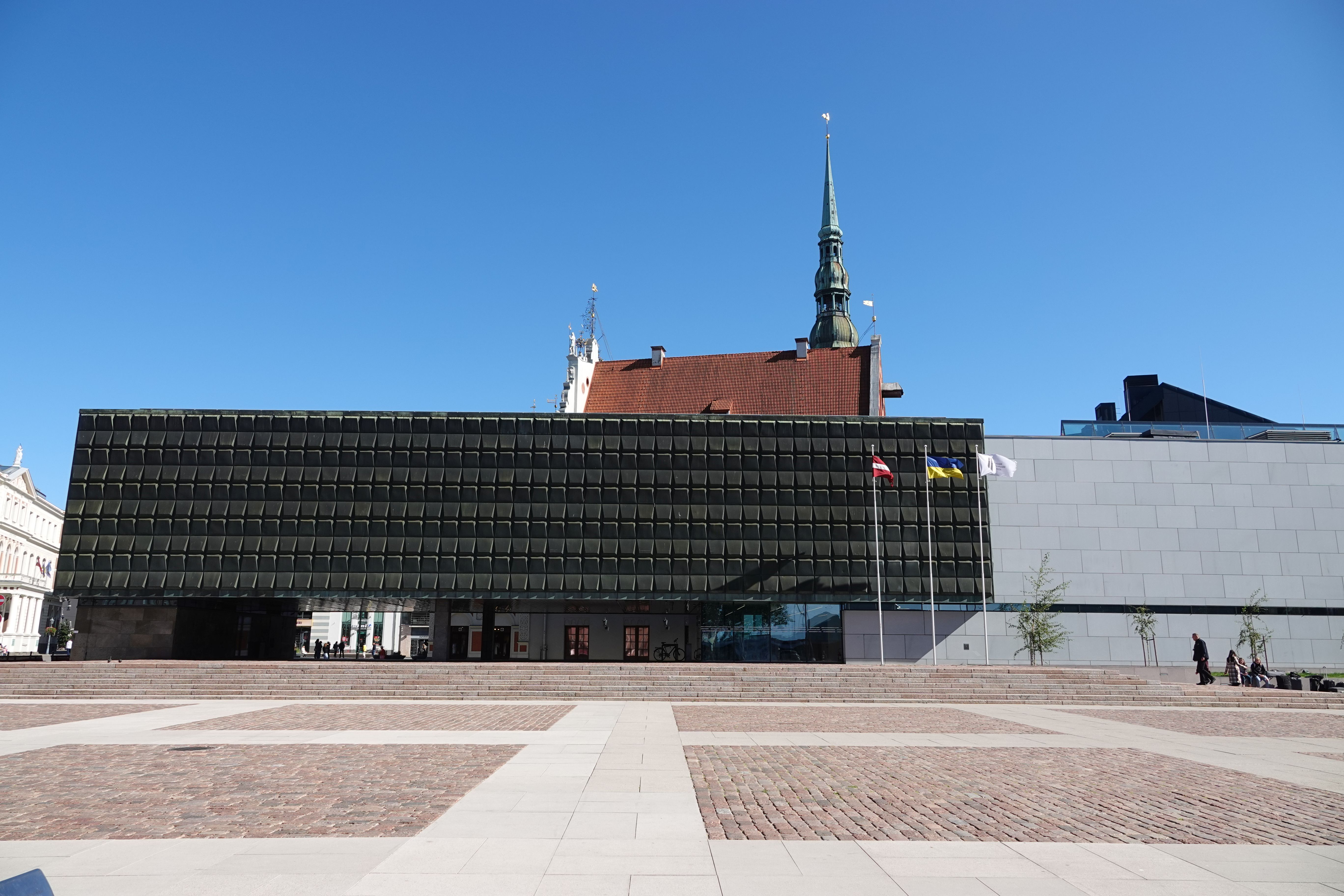
- Main building of the museum
- Established: 1993
- Location: Latviešu strēlnieku laukums 1, Rīga (main); Raiņa bulvāris 7, Rīga, Latvia (temporary location 2012–2022)
- Type: History museum, memorial museum
- Collection size: 60,000
- Director: Solvita Vība
- Owner: Occupation Museum Association
- Website: okupacijasmuzejs.lv/en

The Museum of the Occupation of Latvia (Latvian: Latvijas Okupācijas muzejs) is a museum and history education institution in Riga, Latvia. It was established in 1993 to exhibit artifacts, archive documents, and educate the public about the 51-year period in the 20th century when Latvia was successively occupied by the USSR in 1940–1941, then by Nazi Germany in 1941–1944, and then again by the USSR in 1944–1991. Official visits to Latvia by top level representatives of other countries normally include a visit to the Museum of the Occupation.

The institution also operates an exhibition in the Corner House – the former KGB headquarters in Riga.

After 10 years of reconstruction work, a new permanent exhibition was opened to the public on June 1, 2022. The day earlier the exhibition was attended by the President of Latvia, Egils Levits, and the Minister of Culture, Nauris Puntulis.

== History ==
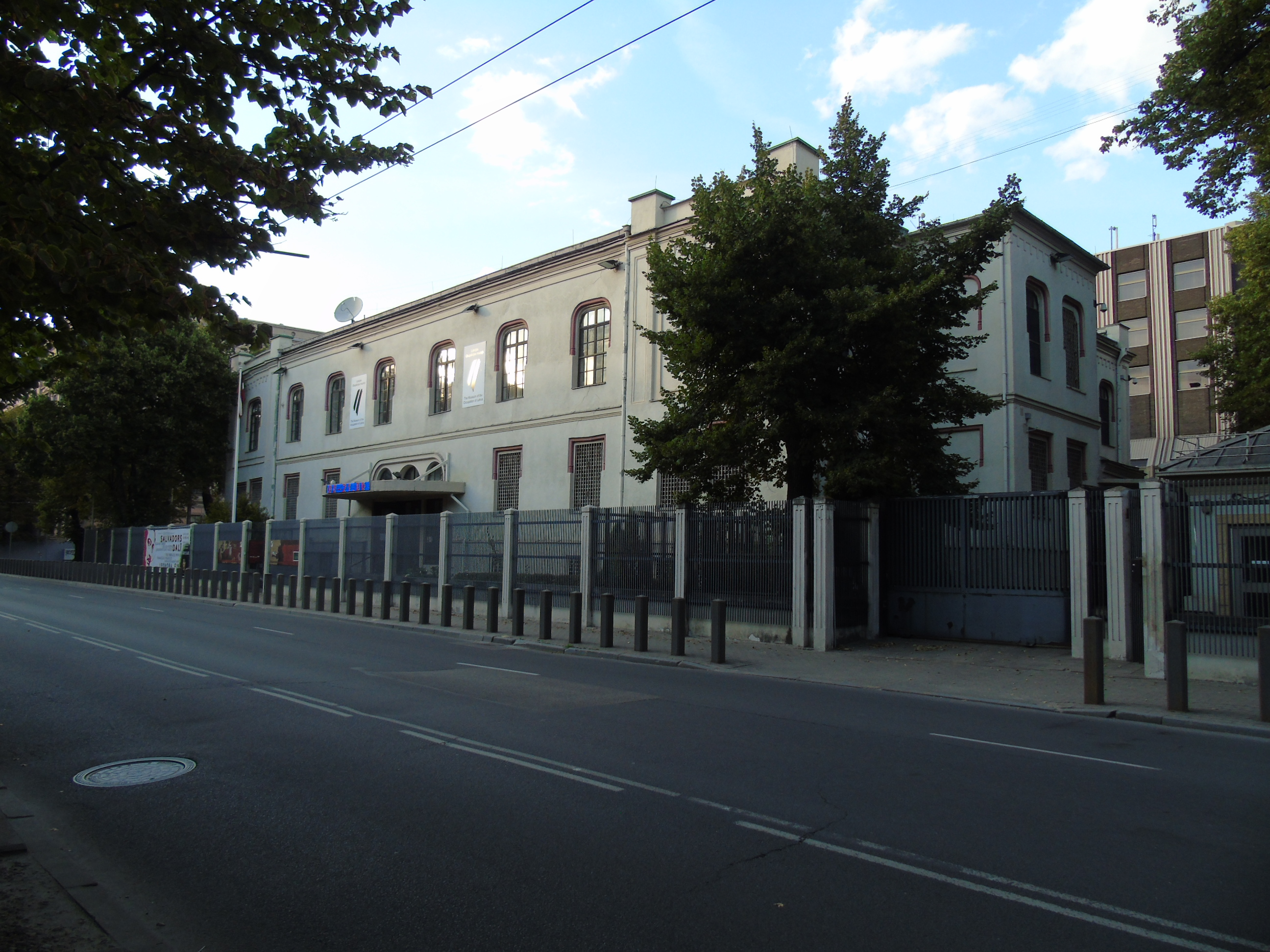
Former site of the museum at Raiņa bulvāris 7 (2012–2022)

The main building in 2011

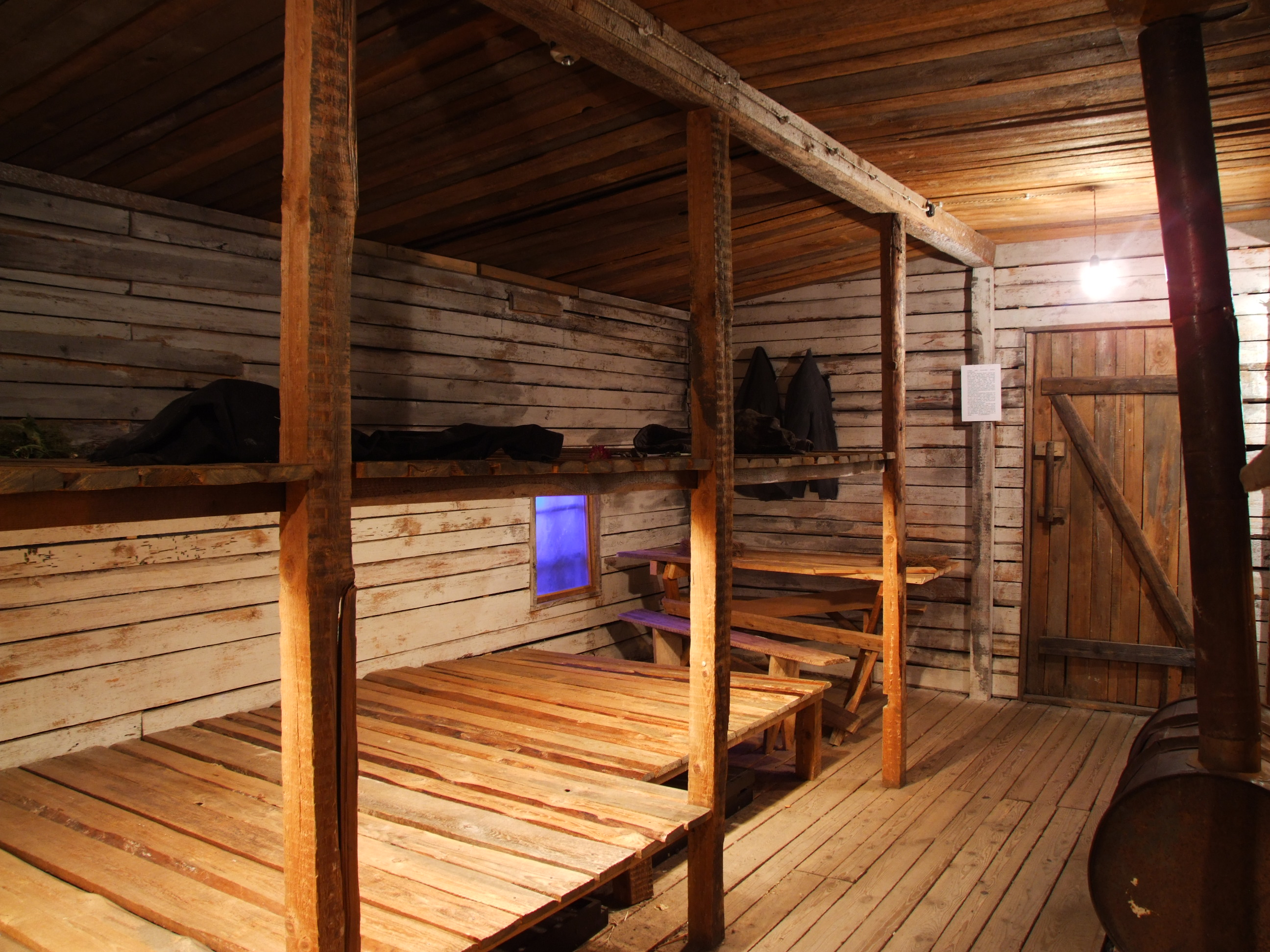
Reconstruction of a Gulag barrack in the original exhibition

The museum was established in 1993 after Paulis Lazda, a history professor at the University of Wisconsin–Eau Claire, proposed the idea to the Ministry of Culture of the Republic of Latvia to create a museum covering the occupation period of Latvia, from 1940 to 1991. This led to the establishment of the Occupation Museum Foundation (OMF), now the Occupation Museum Association (OMB), in spring 1993. The OMF was made of 11 people who aimed to establish, administer and finance the museum.

The first exhibition of the museum opened on 1 July 1993. The exhibition covered the period of the first Soviet occupation of Latvia from 1940 to 1941. The museum was expanded in the following years to cover the whole occupation period.

== Mission ==
The museum's stated mission is to:

- "Show what happened in Latvia, its land and people under two occupying totalitarian regimes from 1940 to 1991;
- "Remind the world of the crimes committed by foreign powers against the state and people of Latvia;
- "Remember the victims of the occupation: those who perished, were persecuted, forcefully deported or fled the terror of the occupation regimes.

== Collection ==
When the museum was established it began to collect objects relating to the occupation periods. The collection, as of the beginning of 2017, contained nearly 60,000 registered items. The collection also includes an audiovisual archive containing more than 2,300 video testimonials of deportees, refugees, and others affected by the occupations of Latvia. The audiovisual department has also made 10 documentary films.

== Building ==
The main museum building was built by the Soviets in 1971 to celebrate what would have been the 100th birthday of Lenin, and until 1991 it served as a museum commemorating the Red Latvian Riflemen. The planned renovation of the building, which began in the summer of 2018 after years of planning and negotiations, meant that since November 2012 the museum was temporarily housed in Raiņa bulvāris 7 (Rainis Boulevard), the site of the former United States Embassy, nearby the Freedom Monument. It was planned that the renovated museum building, dubbed "House For the Future" and designed by the Latvian-American architect Gunnar Birkerts, would be completed in 2020.

The works were ultimately finished in late 2021, and in November the museum started its relocation back to the original building and the construction of the new permanent exhibition. The wall-shaped "Tactile of History' (Latvian: Vēstures taktīla) memorial to the victims of Soviet occupation was unveiled next to the museum in summer 2021. The completed exhibition was opened to the public on June 1, 2022.

== See also ==
- Occupation of the Latvian Republic Day
- Museum of Occupations and Freedom Fights, Lithuania
- Vabamu Museum of Occupations and Freedom in Tallinn, Estonia
