= Augusts Malvess =

Latvian architect

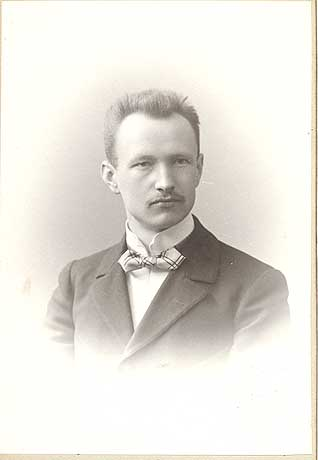
- Augusts Malvess around 1900
- Born: 2 November 1878; Spalvas, Vecgulbene parish, Russian Empire (now Gulbene Municipality, Latvia)
- Died: 9 May 1951 (aged 72); Rīga, Latvian SSR
- Known for: Architecture
- Movement: Art Nouveau
- Patrons: Konstantīns Pēkšēns

Augusts Malvess (2 November 1878, Gulbene – 9 May 1951, Riga) was a Latvian architect.

Augusts Malvess was born in Gulbene in northeastern Latvia and studied architecture at Riga Polytechnic Institute, today Riga Technical University. He graduated in 1906. The following two years he worked in the firm of Konstantīns Pēkšēns, and worked independently from 1909. He was a lecturer at the University of Latvia from 1919 to 1950. He was promoted to extraordinary professor there in 1939 and in 1944 he was promoted to full professor.

As an architect he designed about twenty residential buildings in Riga (several in Art Nouveau style) in addition to public and civic buildings, as well as buildings in Dzērbene, Cēsis, Sigulda and Smiltene. In addition, he also published a number of scientific articles on the subject of architecture.

== Gallery ==
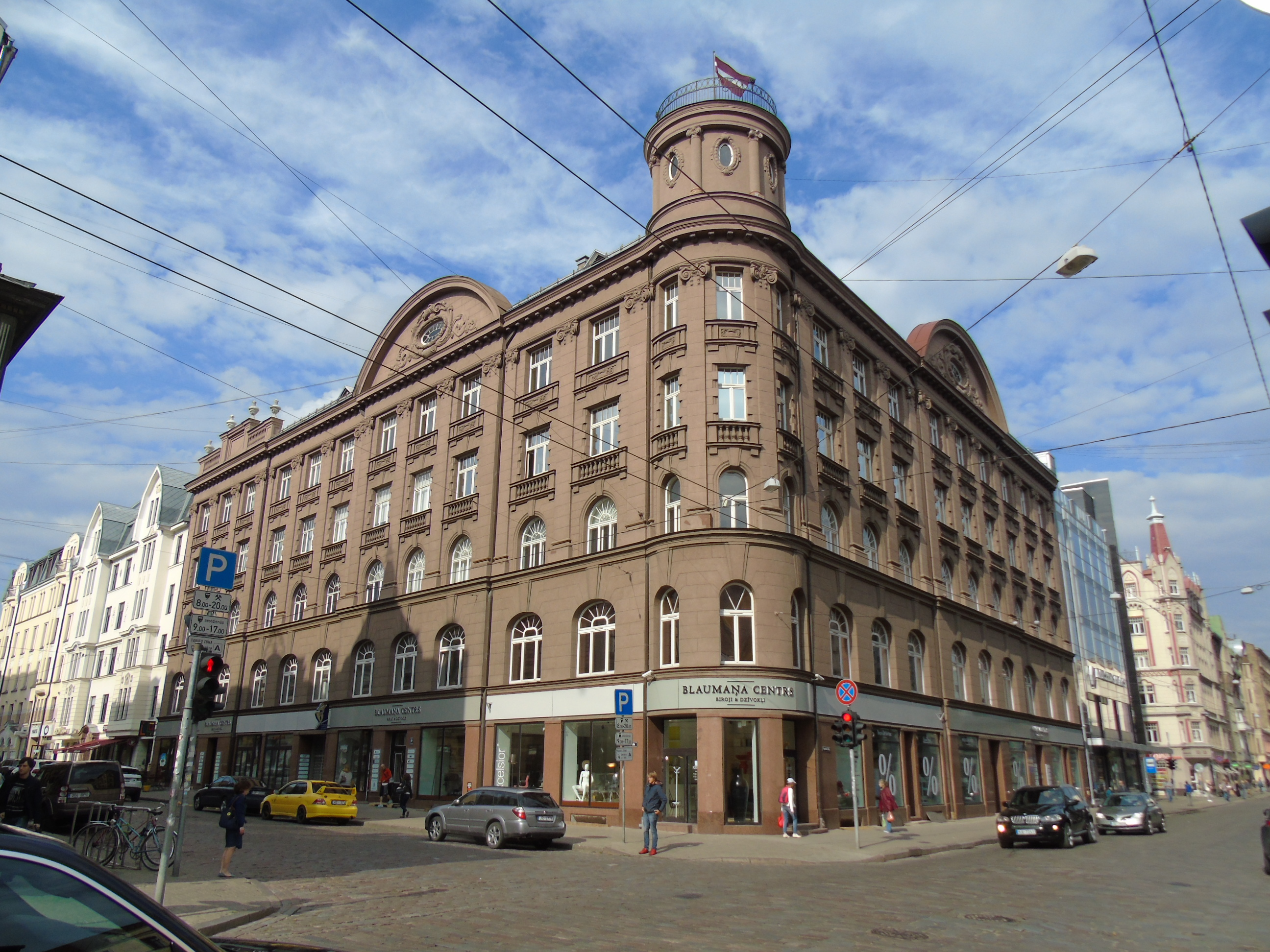
Former bank building at Blaumaņa iela 5, Riga. (1913)

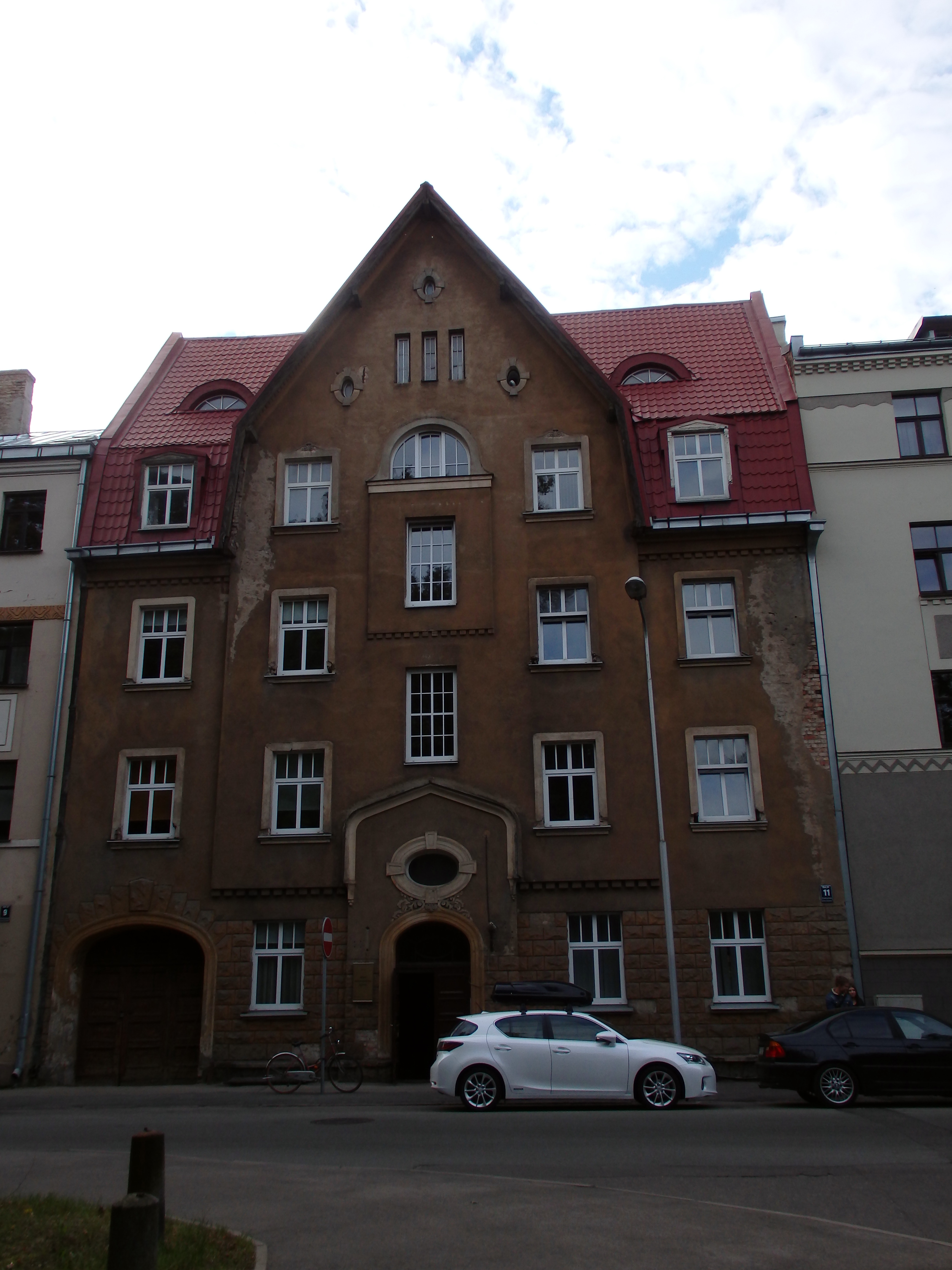
Residential building at Klusā iela 11, Riga. (1911)

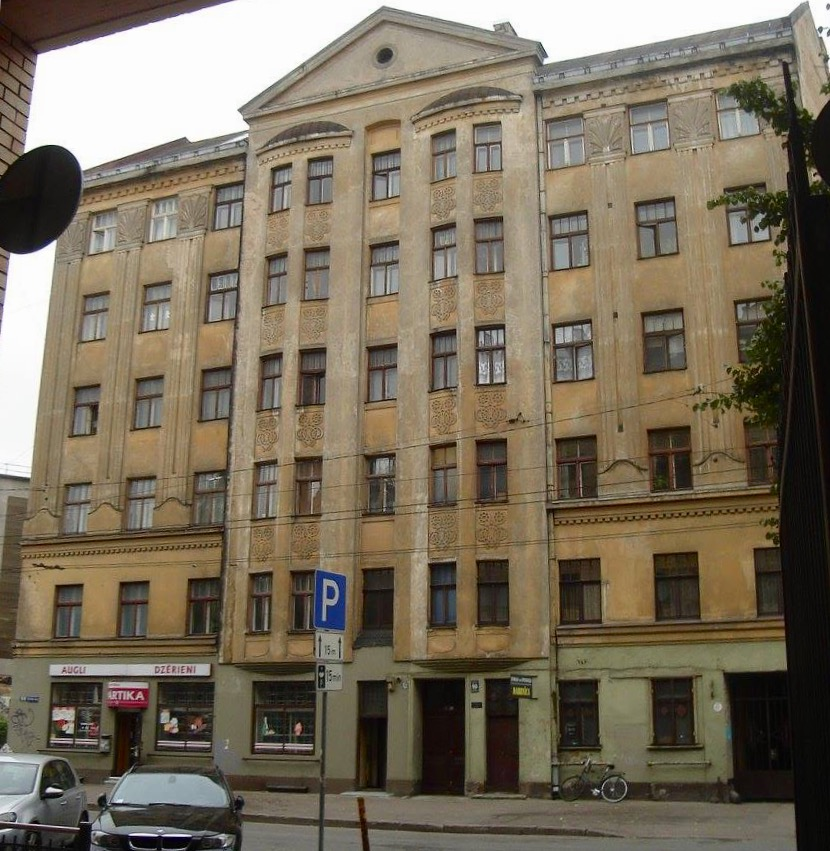
Residential building at Ģertrūdes iela 90, Riga. (1913).

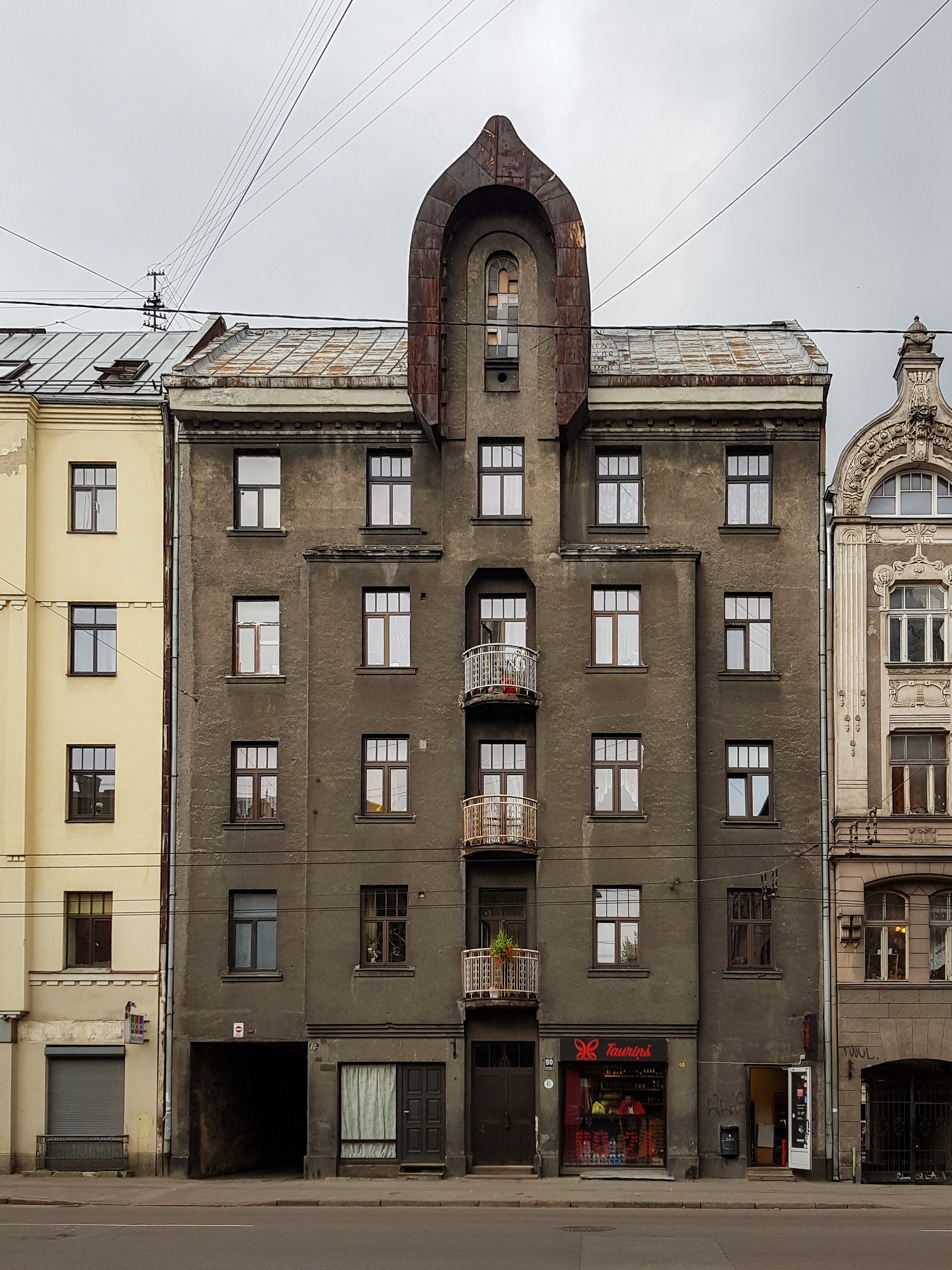
Residential building at Tallinas iela 90, Riga. (1913).
