= Konstantīns Pēkšēns =

Latvian architect (1859–1928)

- Born: 3 March 1859; Ņuki, Mazsalaca parish, Russian Empire (now Latvia)
- Died: 23 June 1928 (aged 69); Weimar Republic, Bad Kissingen
- Known for: Architecture
- Movement: Art Nouveau
- Patrons: Jānis Baumanis

Konstantīns Pēkšēns (born 3 March 1859, Mazsalaca parish, Russian Empire — died 23 June 1928, Bad Kissingen, Weimar Republic) is one of the most prominent Latvian architects of all time. After Jānis Baumanis he is the epitome of the second generation of Latvian architects. Many Latvian cities and towns take pride in buildings designed by Pēkšēns, but Riga alone can boast more than 250 multi-storey brick buildings and a great number of wooden houses erected following his designs.

== Career ==
Pēkšēns was born in the Nuķi estate near Mazsalaca but in 1869 his family moved to Riga. In 1875, Pēkšēns began studies at Riga Polytechnical Institute — at first in the Engineering Department, but from 1880 in the Department of Architecture. He took an active part in social life of students, was founding member of Selonija, a fraternity of Latvian students, participated much in sports. He graduated from the institute in 1885 and spent some time working for the construction office of Jānis Baumanis, in 1886 Pēkšēns opened his own practice. In 1889 he was among those who re-established Riga Architects Society that had disintegrated earlier. Pēkšēns also sat in the councils of a number of credit institutions and banks, and acted as a spokesman for the Riga Latvian Society. Since 1909 he was a member of the Riga City Council, but after World War I was actively involved in several technical commissions under the Riga City Executive Board. Pēkšēns also participated in the publishing of several Latvian newspapers. His broad professional experience allowed him to make a considerable contribution at the debate on how to restore the damages of World War I. Pēkšēns company of plumbing works was well known as the largest local enterprise dealing with the assembly of central heating systems in Riga prior to the war. This company remained in operation until 1940.

At the beginning of the 20th century Pēkšēns also acted as a jury member in several large-scale competitions, while in some other competitions his designs received the highest evaluation. For example, he won the competition for a residential house for workers in 1907, together with Eižens Laube, the Riga Merchants Credit Society Bank at 14, Tērbatas Street (1909), together with Arthur Moedlinger, and Ozoliņš' apartment building at 88, Brīvības Street (1910) together with Ernest Pole. All those associates of Pēkšēns, just like Aleksandrs Vanags, August Malvess, and others who later became well known in Riga in their own right, accumulated their professional experience while working in the construction and technical office of the master.

In 1928 in an attempt to improve his seriously deteriorating health Pēkšēns went to Bad Kissingen in Germany, but the trip was to no avail. The sad news of his death reached his native country on the night of the Līgo festival. The master was buried at the Forest Cemetery in Riga.

== Art Nouveau ==
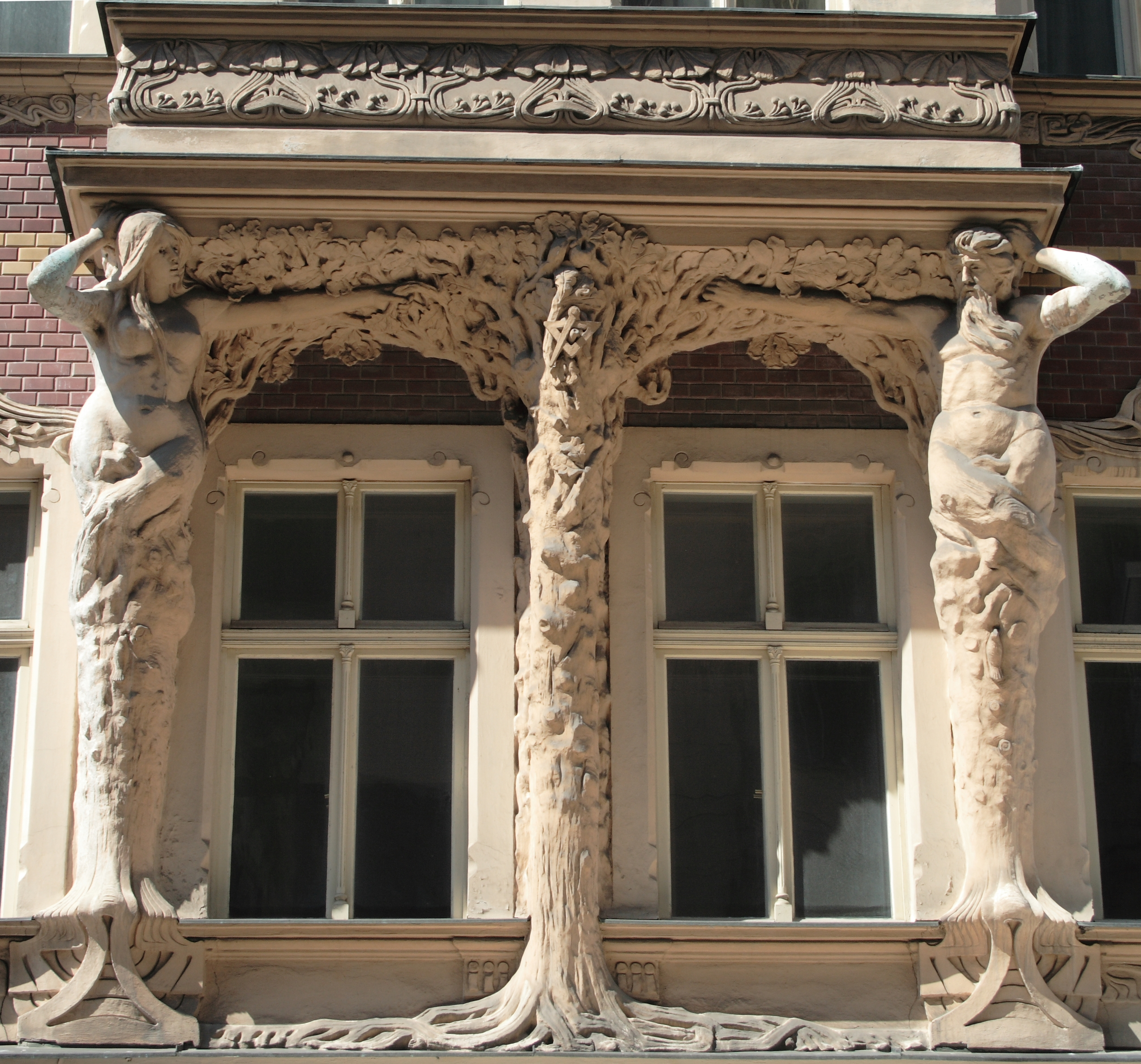
Miss Riga at 2, Smilšu Street to the left. Recognised as one of the most beautiful masterpieces on facades of Art Nouveau buildings in Riga

During the golden age of Art Nouveau of the early 20th century several buildings with a fascinating abundance and variety of decorative motifs typical for this new style were designed by Pēkšēns. Examples are the houses at 6, Strēlnieku Street, 13, Kaļķu Street and 2, Smilšu Street built in 1902. The peculiarity of the latter lies in the fact that an every single window decoration is different, and under the bay windows are hermas—supports as sculpted upper bodies. One of these sculptures was given the title Miss Riga from among the stone females displayed on the facades of the buildings in Riga.

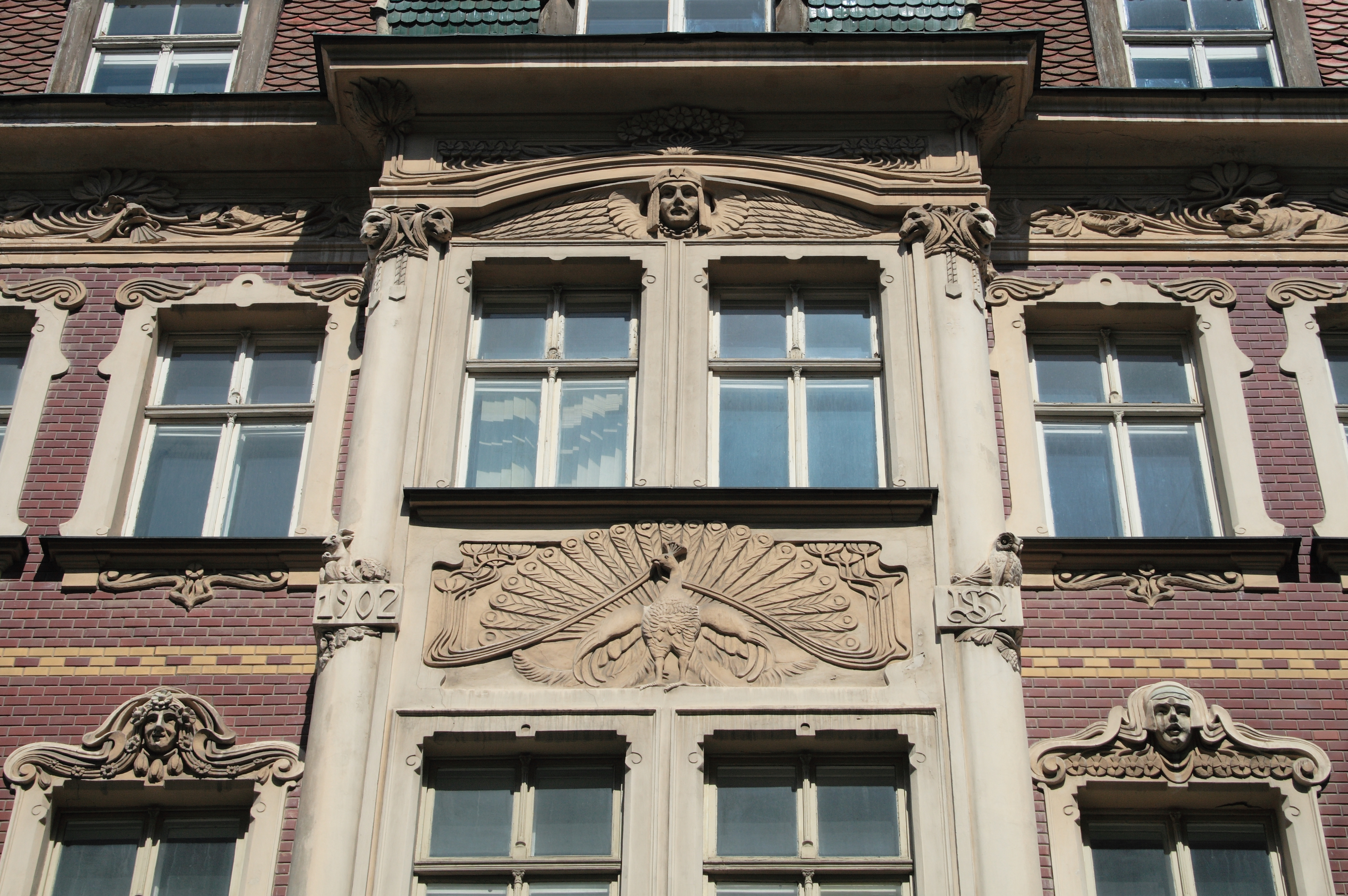
Detail from the building at 2, Smilšu Street

The most characteristic feature of Pēkšēns creative work, is the respective reserve and deep logic of architectural forms arising out of the Art Nouveau artistic principle, namely, the beauty of a building should not depend on outside applications, but derive from a practical and utilitarian layout. Most of Pēkšēns buildings are defined by a clear arrangement of volumes corresponding to the layout of interior spaces, careful choice of building materials and decor governed by the basic architectural form.

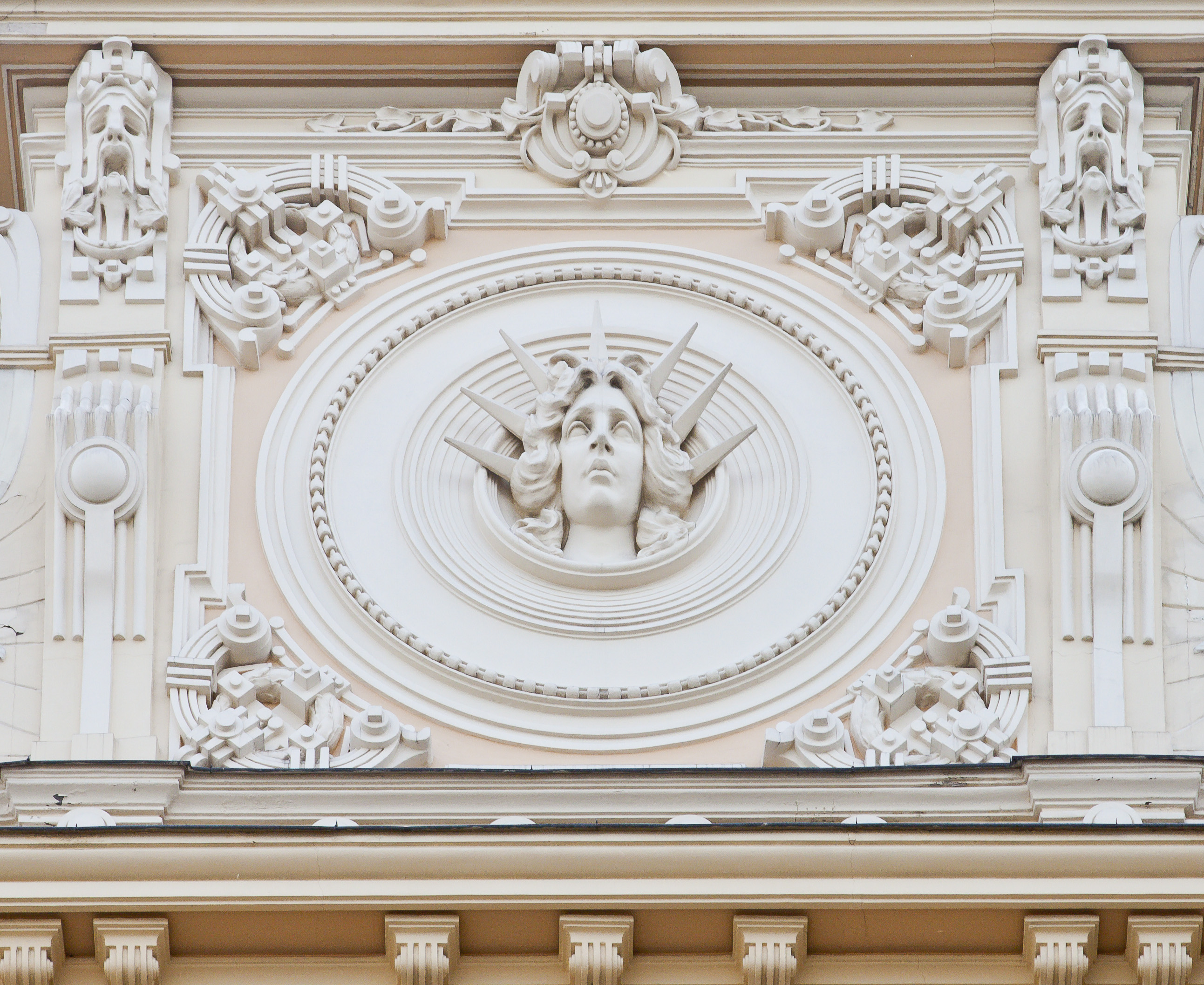
Detail from the building at 13, Alberta Street

Such rational Art Nouveau evidence is present in the buildings at 46, Brīvības Street (1907) and 14, Tērbatas Street (1909), apartment houses at 14, Ausekļa Street (1909), 1 and 44, Avotu Street (both 1904) and 66, Avotu Street (1912), 5, Krišjāņa Barona Street (1909), 45, Baznīcas Street (1909), 148 and 172, Brīvības Street (1912 and 1911), 5, Hospitāļu Street (1904), 6, Marijas Street (1904), 5, Noliktavas Street (1904), 3, 9 and 13, Rūpniecības Street (1908, 1910 and 1909), 32, Skolas Street (1904), 31, Slokas Street (1908), 9/11, Tērbatas Street (1912), 4 and 10, Vīlandes Street (both 1908), 12 and 14, Vīlandes Street (both 1909) and 16, Vīlandes Street (1910), — it is impossible to list them all. Some designs by Pēkšēns contain romanticised reminiscences of historical motifs, others stand out by a vertical compositional arrangement that became especially characteristic of Riga's Art Nouveau movement around 1910. Nevertheless, all the buildings are united by strong forms, elegance, and overall reserve in decorations perceivable only in close-up.

== National Romanticism ==
The National Romantic style had a special role within Riga's Art Nouveau style, and Pēkšēns was one of the originators of this stylistic trend. One of the first National Romantic buildings in Riga was the apartment house at 4, Lāčplēša Street (1905). It was followed by apartment buildings at 40, Krišjāņa Barona Street, 192, Brīvības Street, 1a, Sapieru Street (1907) and 46, Ģertrūdes Street (1908) designed in this idiom as interpreted by Pēkšēns. Today it is difficult to say how much of the architecture of those buildings was created by the master himself and what was contributed by his young associates. It is known with certainty that six very interesting buildings at 23, Tallinas Street, 12, Alberta Street, 26, Aleksandra Čaka Street, 10, Kronvalda Boulevard, as well as 15/17, Tērbatas Street and 33/35, Tērbatas Street, are the result of creative cooperation with Eižens Laube. Although the construction designs bear the signature by Pēkšēns, the author of the artistic ideas here was Laube. At the same time, the facade of the house at 192, Brīvības Street, contains patterns of expressions characteristic to buildings designed by August Malvess.

== Outside Riga ==
The most outstanding houses designed by Pēkšēns outside Riga are the District Council buildings in Ādaži and Dole, the church in Lejasciems (1895), his own summer house in Dzintari, the temporary concert hall in Jelgava built for the IV General Latvian Song Festival (1895), and Nicholas' Church of the Latvian parish in Jelgava (1904—09, demolished after World War II).

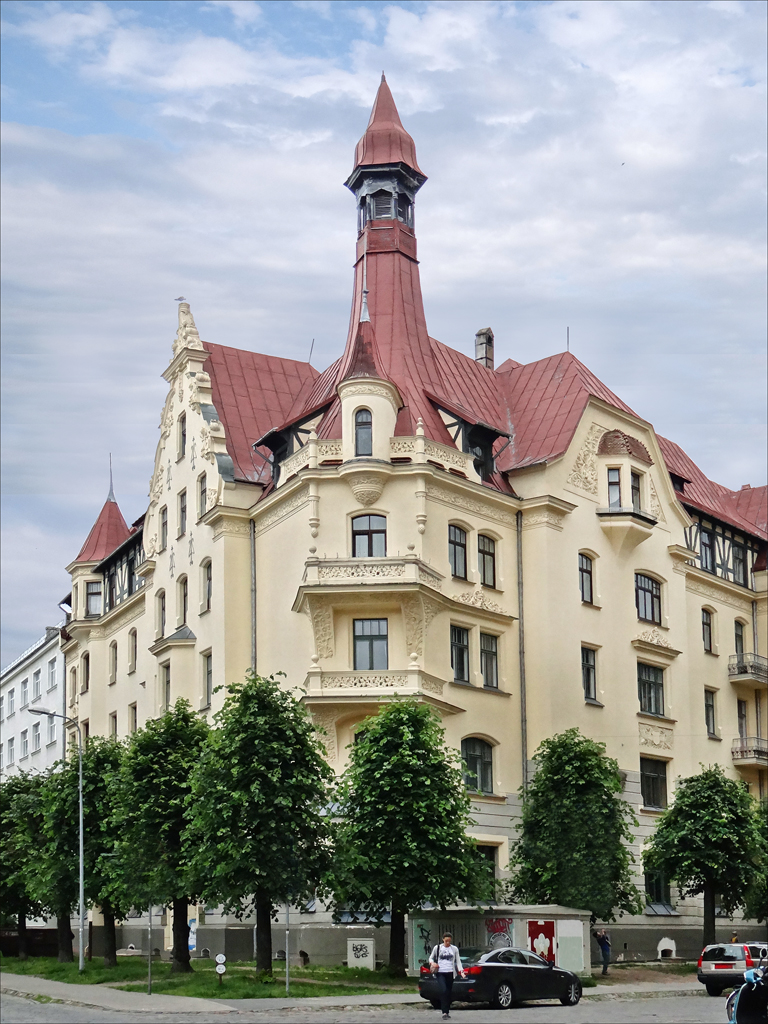
Building on the Alberta street, Riga. Built in 1903. Pēkšēns lived in this house his last years.

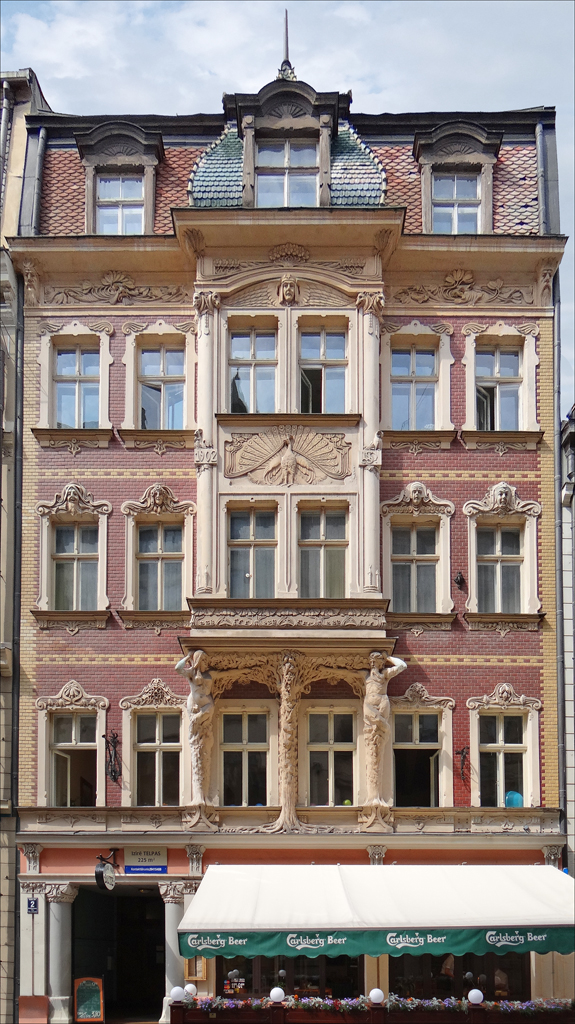
Building on the Smilšu street, Riga. Built in 1902

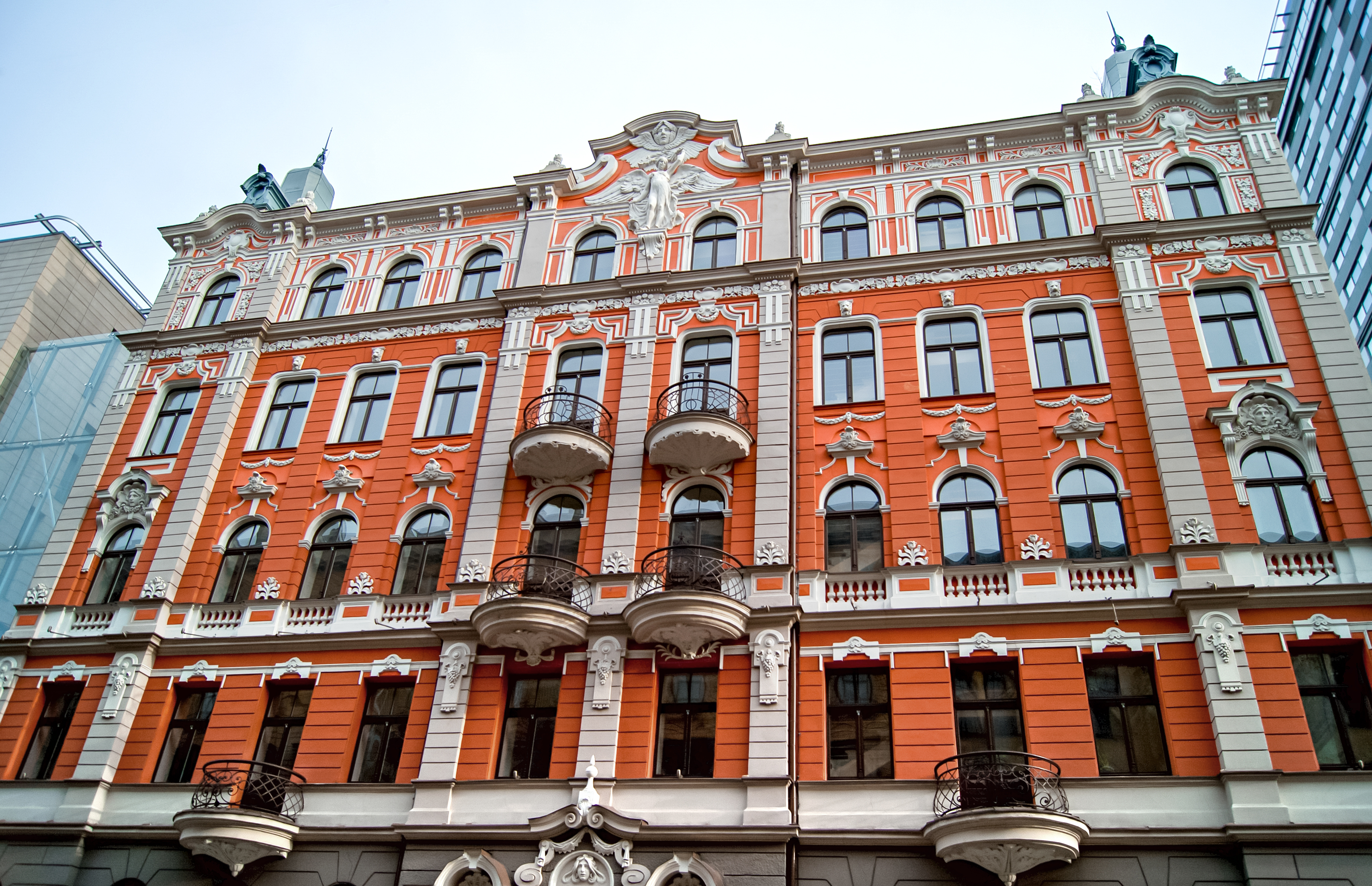
Building on the Baznīcas street 4a, (1901) Riga

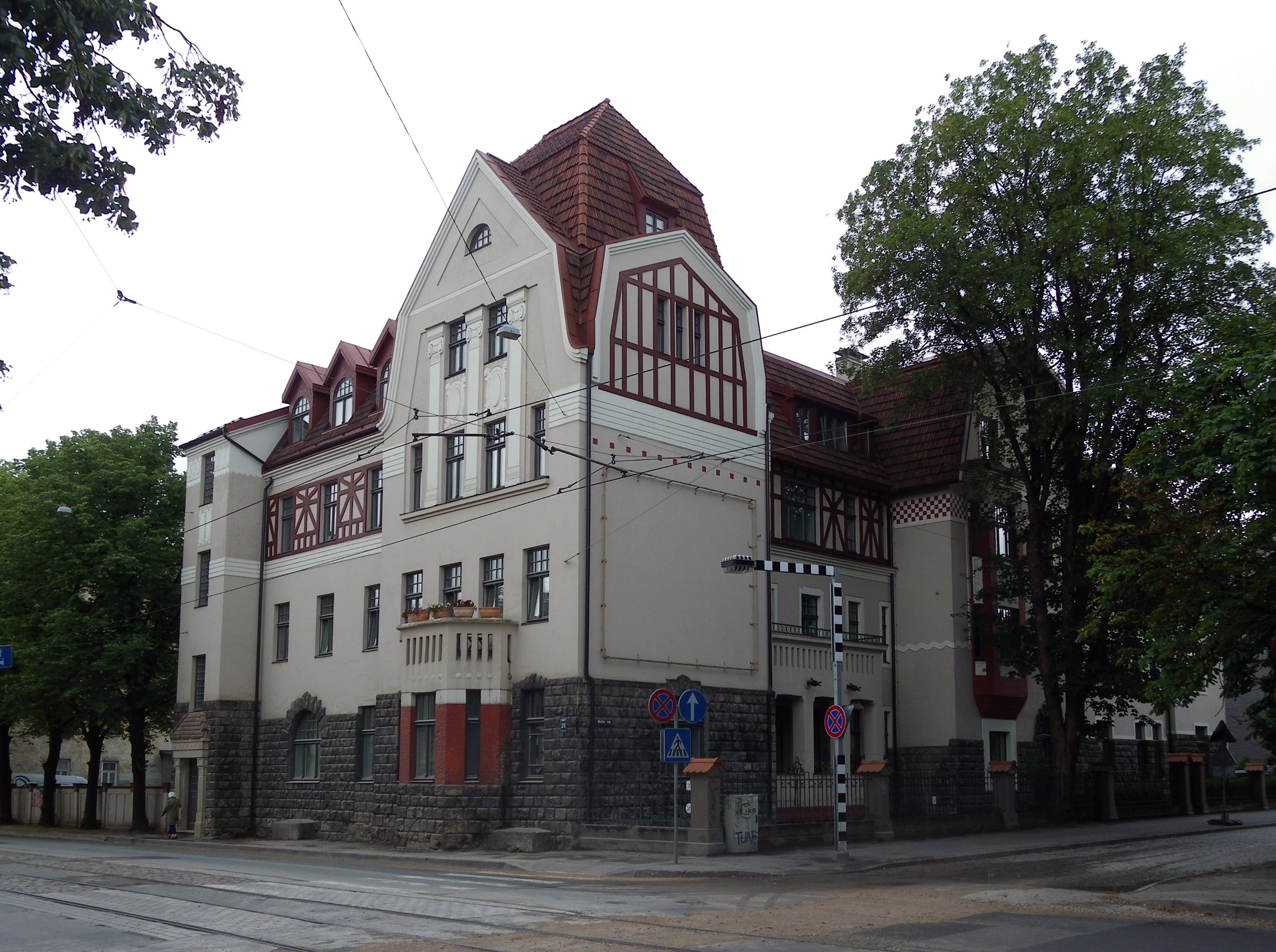
Building on the Slokas street 31 (1908) Riga.'

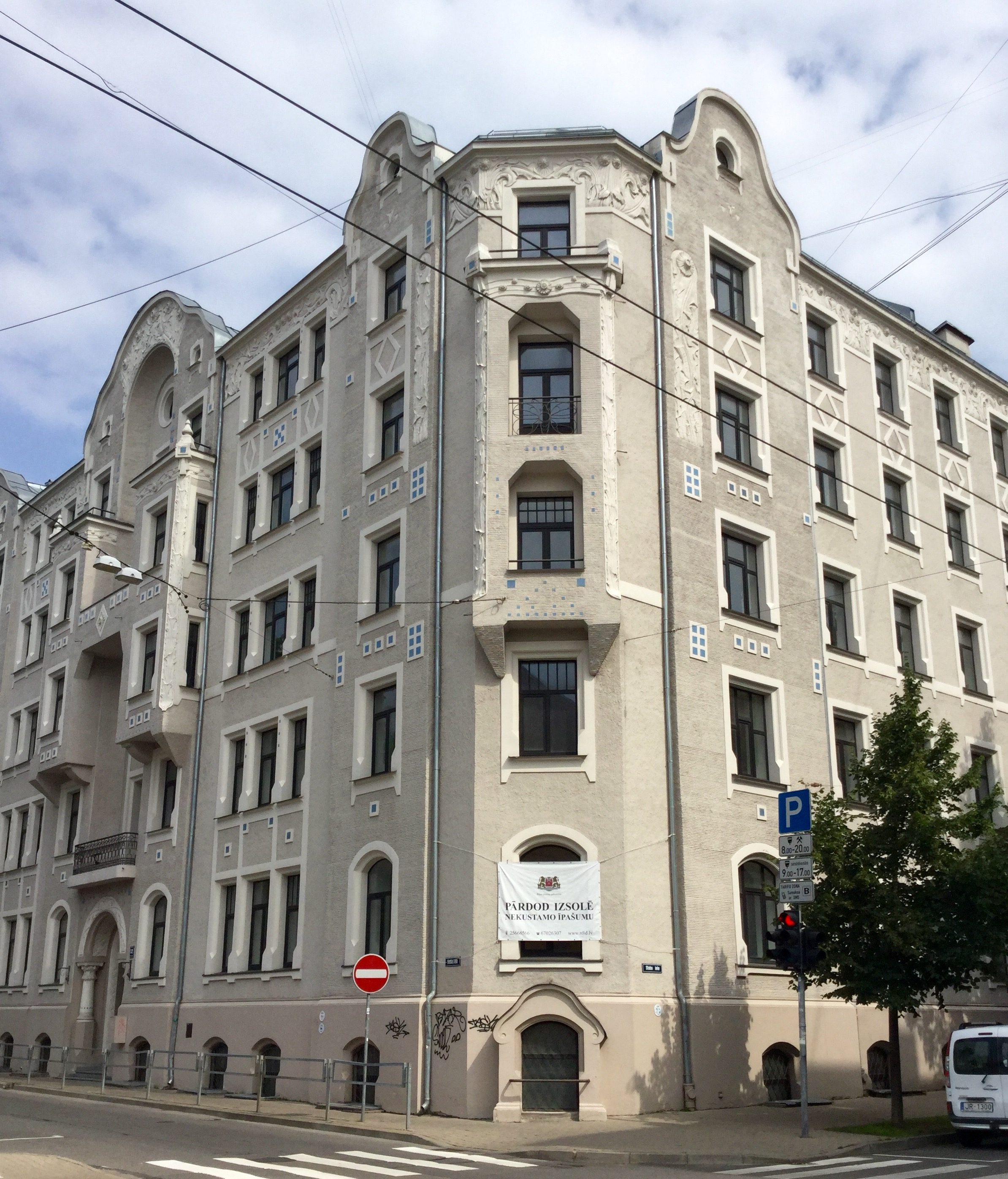
Building on the Skolas street 32, (1904) Riga.

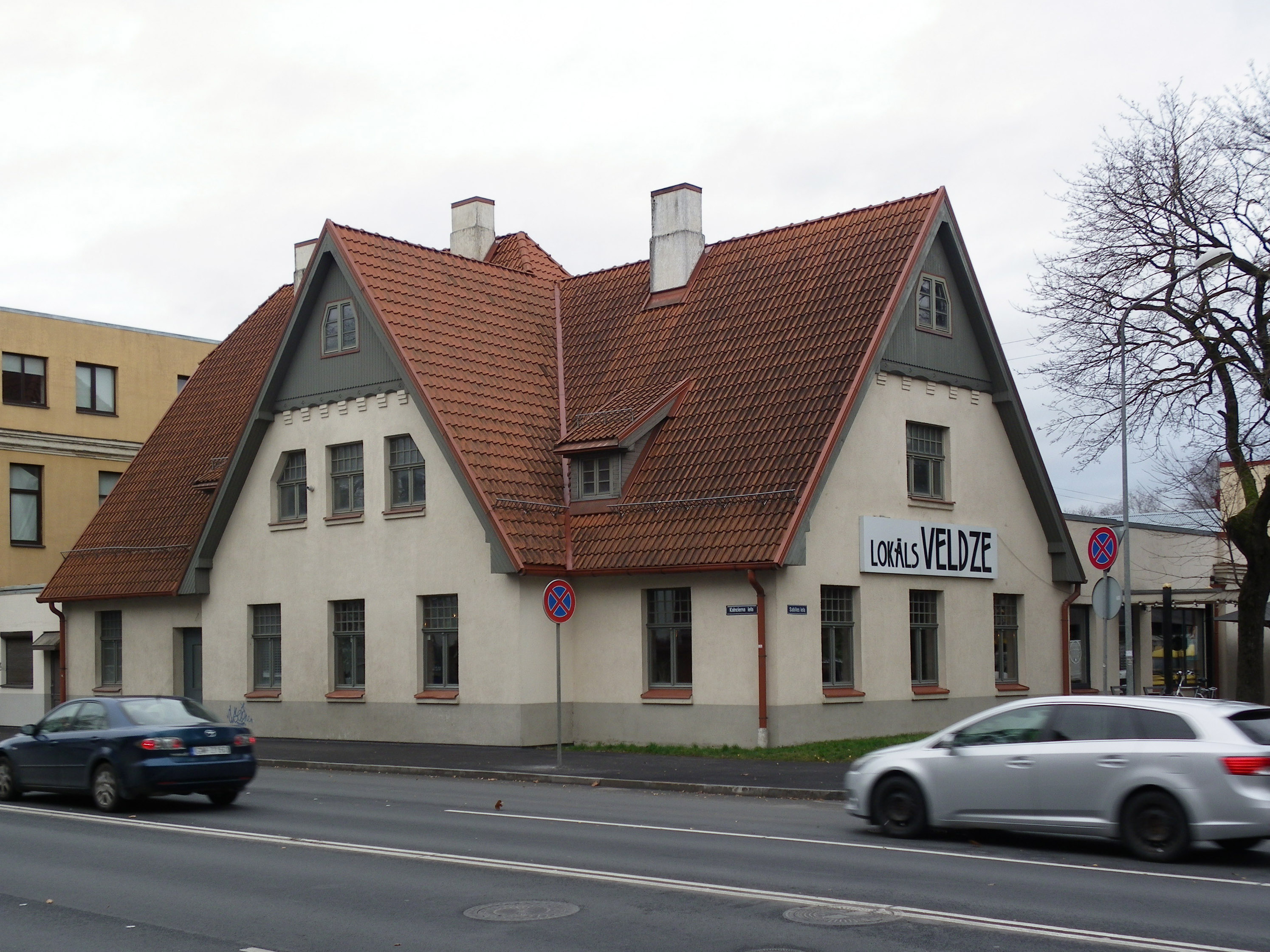
Building on the Kalnciema street 40F, (1907-1908), Riga.

== See also ==
- Art Nouveau architecture in Riga

== Sources ==
- Krastiņš, Jānis (2002). Rīgas arhitektūras meistari 1850-1940 : The masters of architecture of Riga 1850-1940 (in Latvian and English). Riga: Jumava. ISBN 9984-05-450-0. OCLC 52258305.
