= Corner House (Riga) =

Former KGB headquarters in Riga, Latvia

Coordinates: 56.9582°N 24.1238°E

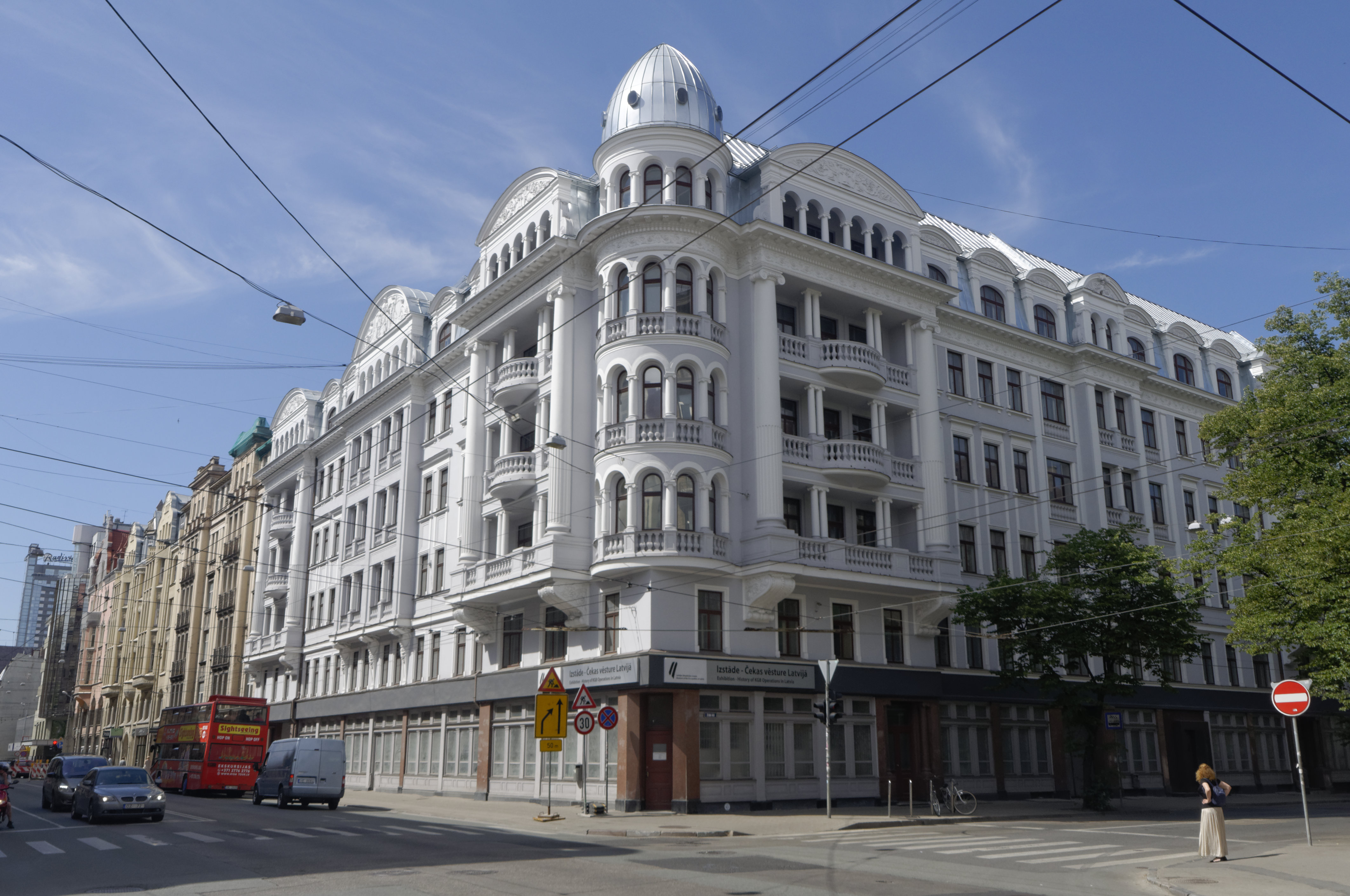
Corner House in Riga (2017)

The Corner House (Latvian: Stūra māja) is a historic building in the city center of Riga, Latvia. It was known as the headquarters of the Soviet KGB in Latvia from 1940 to 1941 and from 1944 to 1991. The official address is 61 Brīvības iela (Freedom Street).

Designed by architect Aleksandrs Vanags, the construction of the house was started in 1910, and was built in 1912 as apartments and shops. It housed the music school of the Imperial Russian Society of Music, a library and a bookstore, sweets and fruit, dairy products, flower shops, and a pharmacy of the Ministry of National Welfare. During the Latvian War of Independence, the Latvian Revolutionary War Committee used the building briefly in 1919. In 1920, the new government of independent Latvia took over the building for government use, including the Ministry of the Interior and other offices. The Interior Affairs Ministry of Latvia used the building in the 1920s and 1930s. At different times the building was owned by the Public Affairs Ministry, State Statistical Bureau, and Forestry Department. It was home to the Latvian Anti-Alcohol Society, different publishing houses, as well as Education and Culture Directorate, Art and Public Affairs Department, Church and Confessions Department, as well as other institutions.

In 1940, during the Soviet occupation of Latvia in 1940, the house was converted into KGB offices and dozens of cells. In 1941–1944, during most of the German occupation of Latvia during World War II, a youth group called “National Watch” occupied the building, as well as Latvia's puppet government, appointed by the Nazis. With the Soviet re-occupation of Latvia in 1944, the Soviet Red Army took over the house once again.

After the restoration of Latvia's independence, State Police occupied this building from the beginning of 1990 until mid-July 2008. In 2014, the house was opened as part of Riga's tenure as a European Capital of Culture. From 2015 the house is used by the Museum of the Occupation of Latvia for an exposition about the history of the KGB in Latvia. In 2015, the house underwent a facade renovation. In 2020, the house was offered at auction by the government.

== Gallery ==
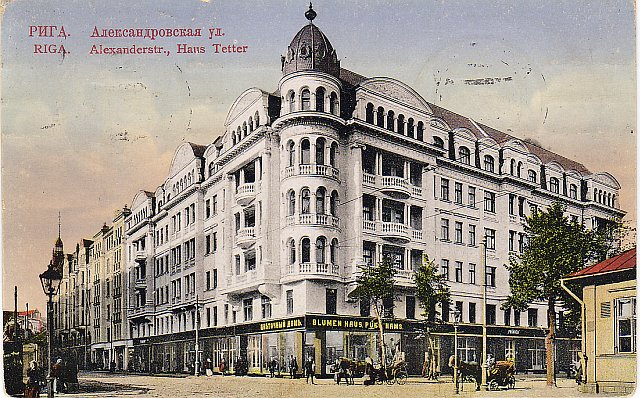
Old Postcard

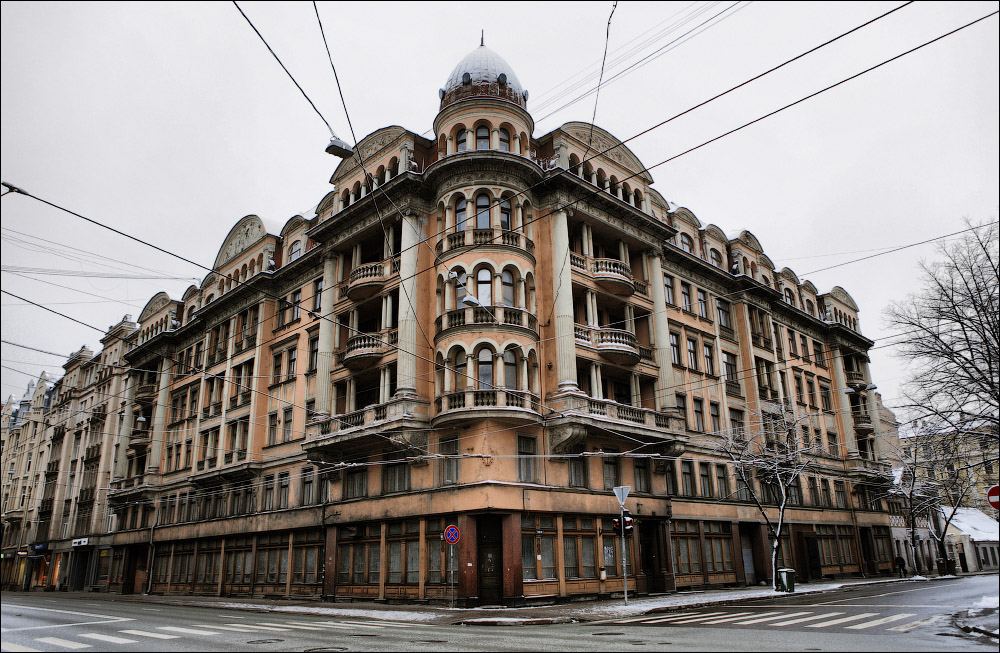
Before renovation in 2014

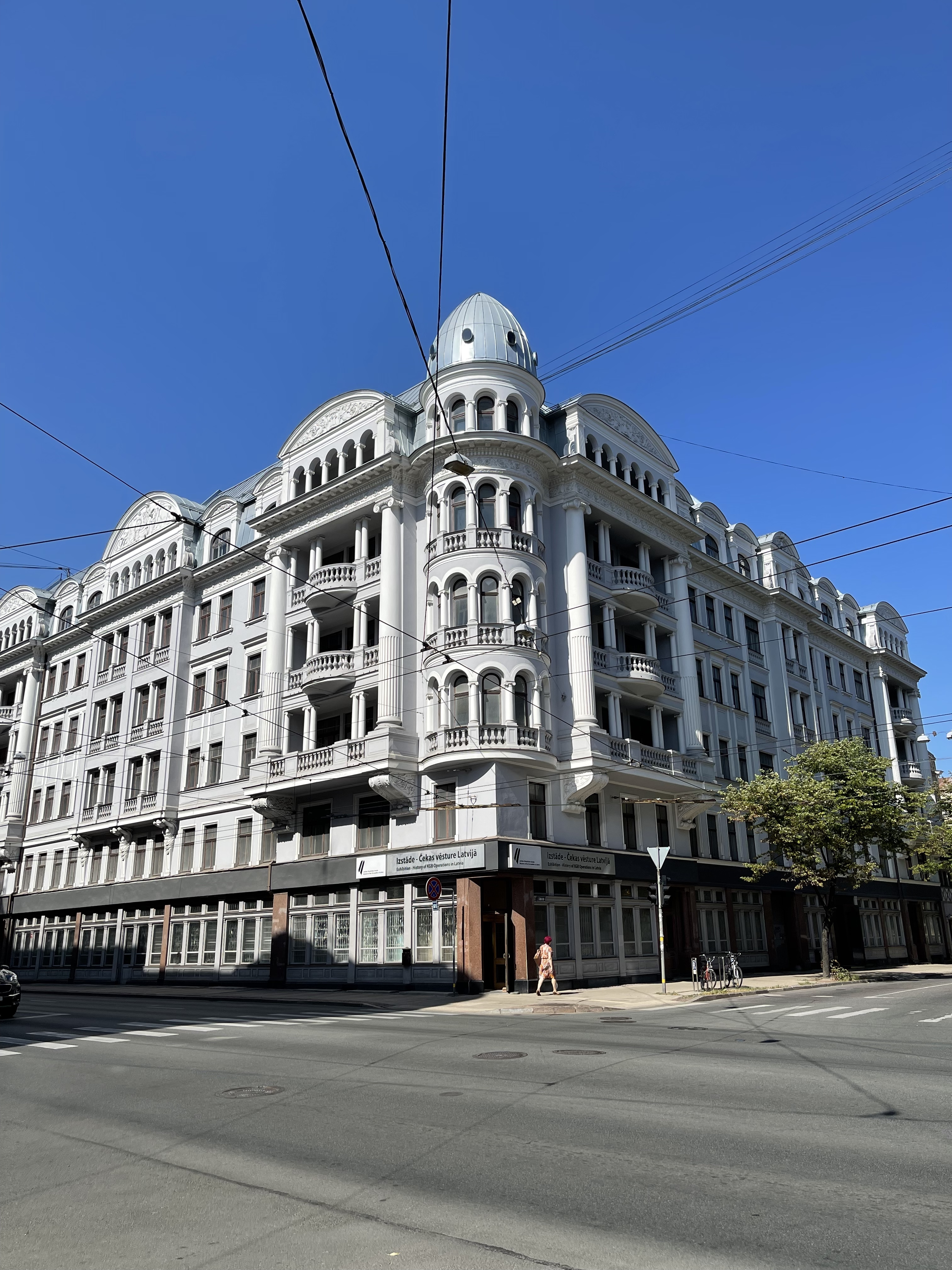
After renovation in 2021

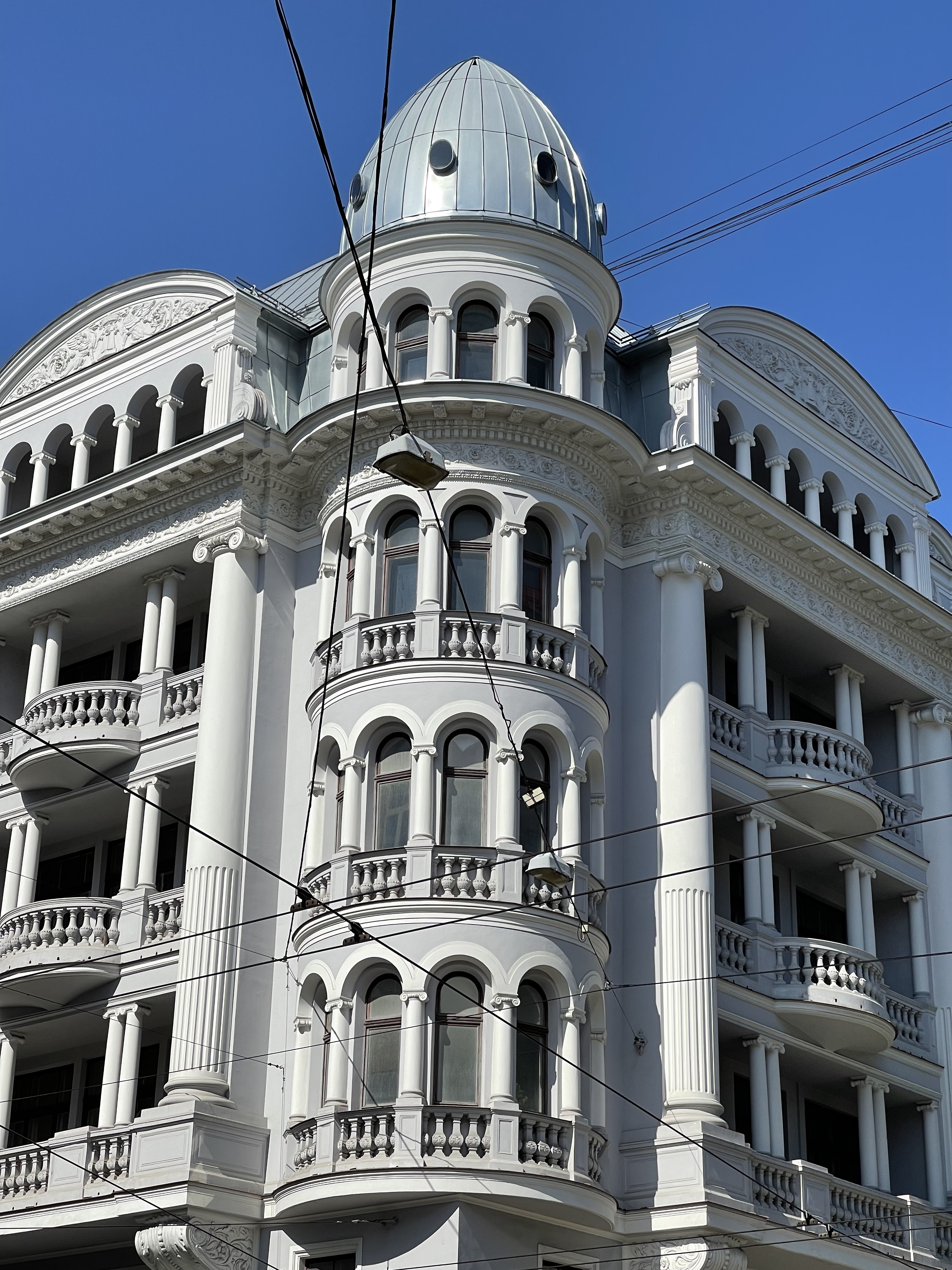
Stūra māja 2021
