= Committee for State Security of the Latvian Soviet Socialist Republic =

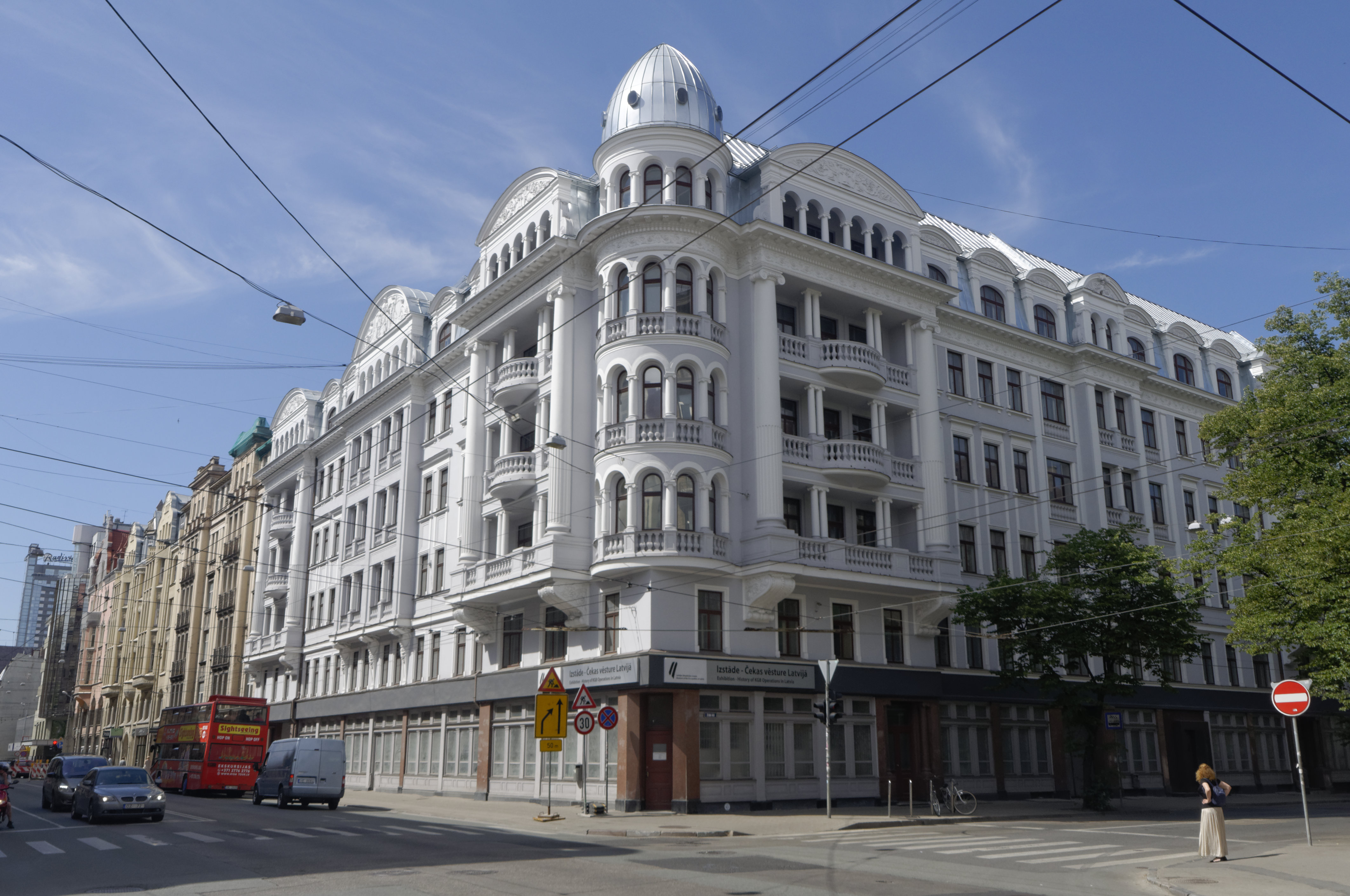
Corner House, the headquarters of the organization.

Committee for State Security of the Latvian Soviet Socialist Republic (Latvian: Latvijas Padomju Sociālistiskās Republikas Valsts drošības komiteja; Russian: Комитет государственной безопасности Латвийской ССР) or KGB of LSSR (Latvian: VDK) was the secret police and state security organization of the Latvian Soviet Socialist Republic.

Legally and hierarchically, the Security Committee was subordinate to the Council of Ministers of the Latvian SSR as well as the KGB as a territorial unit. Orders were issued by the Communist Party of the Soviet Union, the Central Committee, Latvian Communist Party Central Committee, and the KGB. Both full-time and freelance employees of the committee were commonly referred to as "Chekists".

It was controlled by the Soviet KGB and was established on April 10, 1954 and dissolved on August 24, 1991.

== Genocide, terror, and crimes against humanity ==
Immediately after the occupation of Latvia, Soviet NKVD officers, led by Simons Šustins (Симон Шустин), arrived in Riga. Until the official annexation of the country on August 5, he operated under the alias "Silnieks" in a conspiratorial manner, formally under the command of Vikentijs Latkovskis, head of the Latvian Republic's Political Police.

The NKVD's repressive machinery was fully activated after the annexation of Latvia on August 5, 1940. On August 30, 1940, the Latvian SSR People's Commissariat of Internal Affairs was established under Alfons Noviks, with Šustins as his deputy and head of the State Security Directorate. The State Security Directorate moved from its previous location on Albert Street to the former building of the Latvian Republic's Ministry of Internal Affairs at the corner of Brīvības and Stabu Streets, which was rapidly remodeled to include detention cells and an execution chamber in the basement.

On November 6, 1940, a decree signed by Mikhail Kalinin was enacted, applying the Russian SFSR Criminal Code to Latvia. Article 3 of this decree criminalized participation in organizations such as the Latvian Farmers' Union, the Aizsargi voluntary militia group, Latvian special services, the army, and the border guard. Mass burial sites for executed individuals were established in Baltezers, Katlakalns, and Dreiliņi (Ulbroka forest).

The terror perpetrated by the committee and its predecessors bears the hallmarks of genocide as defined in Article 2 of the United Nations Genocide Convention (adopted on December 9, 1948). Consequently, on February 8, 1996, the Latvian Prosecutor General's Office initiated criminal proceedings against Semjons Šustins under Article 68-1 of the Latvian Criminal Code, titled "Crimes Against Humanity and Genocide." The Latvian court convicted Alfons Noviks on December 13, 1995, for genocide and crimes against humanity, sentencing him to life imprisonment.

== Espionage operations ==
After World War II, the Latvian SSR Ministry of Internal Affairs created a fictitious network of Latvian partisans ("national partisans") who pretended to be Latvian freedom fighters. They conducted fake radio transmissions to intelligence services in Sweden and attempted to establish contacts with real anti-Soviet "Forest Brothers" hiding in Latvia’s forests.

As a result, Latvian agents sent by British intelligence fell into the hands of the KGB (then VDK – the Committee for State Security of the Latvian SSR). One such agent was Rihards Zande. At the same time, VDK agents—posing as nationalist partisans—infiltrated British intelligence and underwent training in London. Upon their return to Latvia, they continued working for the VDK as double agents.

Later, it was revealed that the KGB had even recruited Kim Philby, the head of MI6's Eastern Bloc operations, who later defected to the USSR and visited Riga after his escape.

== Structure of the VDK (Latvian KGB) ==
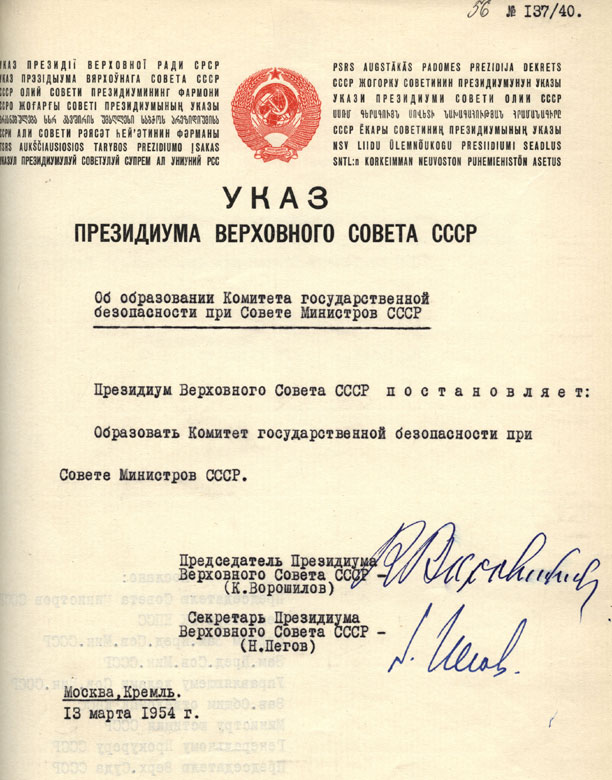
Decree of the Presidium of the Supreme Soviet of the USSR of March 13, 1954, establishing the USSR State Security Committee

The fundamental regulatory document governing the KGB was the "Regulations on the USSR Committee for State Security under the USSR Council of Ministers and its Regional Organs."

The basic organizational unit of the KGB was a department. The next levels were divisions and groups.

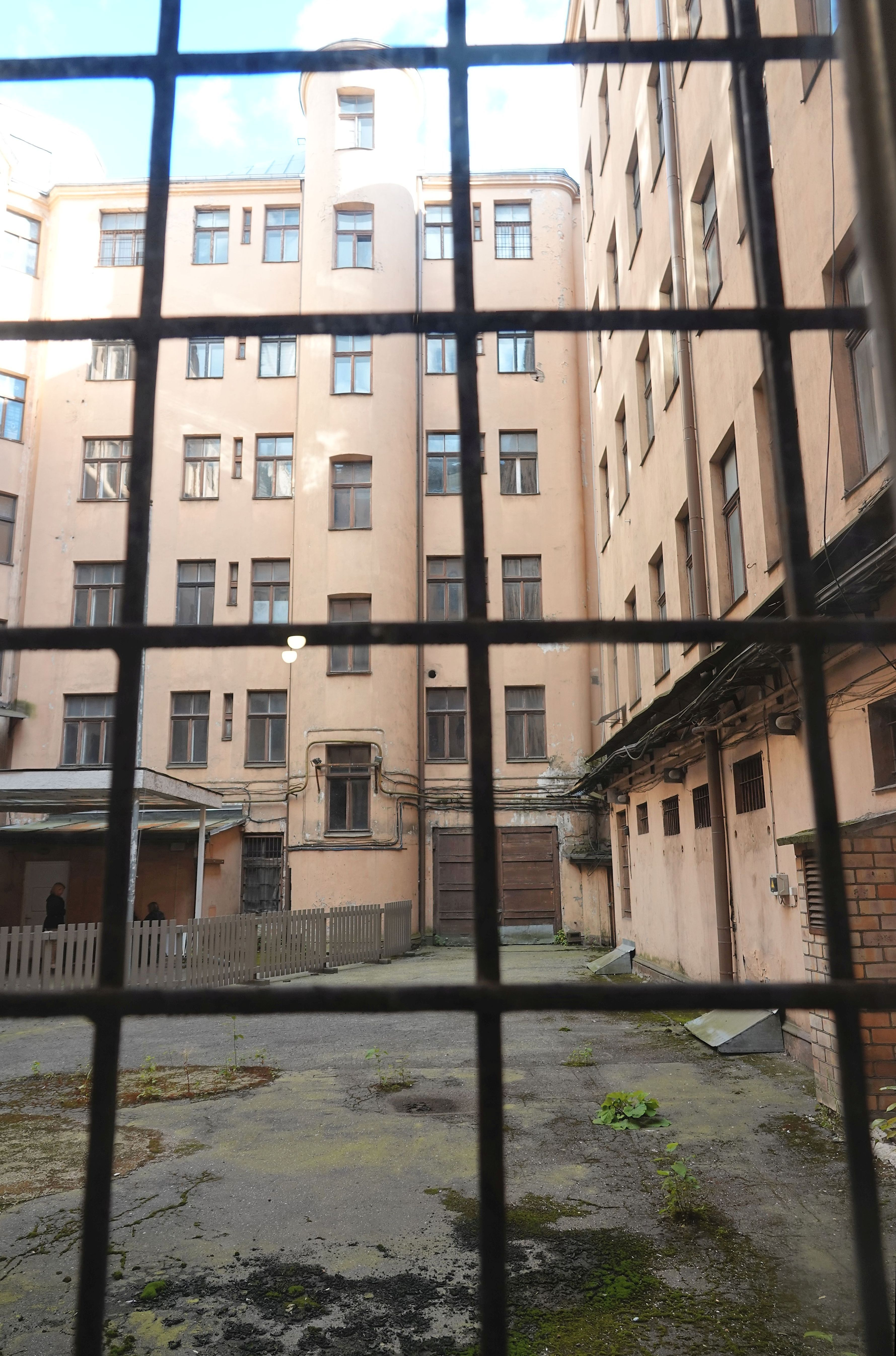
Inner courtyard at Stūra māja (Corner House)

The committee was structured as follows:

- Leadership
- Administration
- Operational Divisions ("Departments"):
  - Intelligence (1st Department)
  - Counterintelligence (2nd Department)
  - Specialized Counterintelligence (Departments 3, 4, 5, 6, and "R" Department)
- Operational Support Departments:
  - External surveillance
  - Technical operations
  - Mail interception (perlustration)
  - Cryptography
  - Communications
  - Other logistical divisions
- Investigation Department: Conducted pre-trial criminal investigations related to KGB jurisdiction
- Special Inspection: Reported directly to the KGB chairman, monitored "socialist legality" within the organization, investigated personnel misconduct, and prepared cases for military tribunals.

=== Leadership structure ===
The KGB was headed by a chairman and three deputies:

1. First Deputy – an emissary from the USSR KGB
2. Second Deputy – usually a local official responsible for ideology (5th Department)
3. Third Deputy – responsible for personnel management

The ruling body of the committee was a collegium, consisting of twelve high-ranking officers, including:

- The chairman and his deputies
- Heads of the 1st, 2nd, and 5th Departments
- Heads of the 4th or 6th Department
- The Ventspils city division head
- One of the Daugavpils, Liepāja, or Jelgava division heads
- One of the district department heads
- The Baltic Military District’s Special Division head or a similar officer from other military branches

Additionally, the Latvian SSR KGB had an internal Communist Party committee (PSKP).

== KGB headquarters and operations in Latvia ==
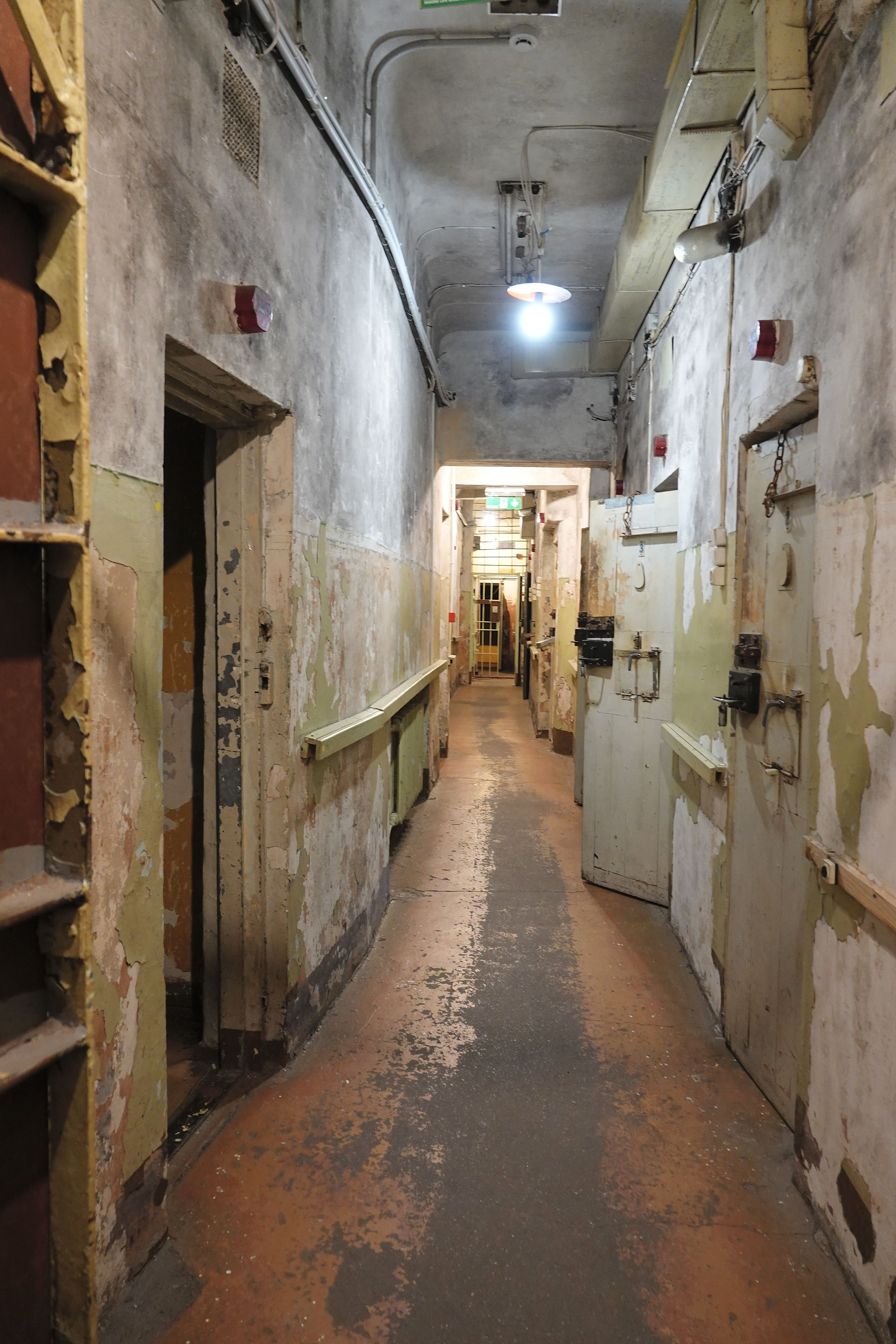
Hallway with cells at Stūra māja (Corner House)

The central KGB headquarters was located at the corner of Lenin Street (Brīvības iela) and Friedrich Engels Street (Stabu iela) in Riga. It was commonly known as the "Stūra māja" in Latvian (Corner House), currently located at Brīvības Street 61 in Riga.

The KGB also established secret apartments (safe houses) where full-time officers met with informants (known in Latvian as "stukači" or snitches). Additionally, KGB offices were embedded in various institutions, such as the 18th floor of the House of Press in Riga.

The KGB was officially dissolved in Latvia by the Supreme Council of the Republic of Latvia on August 24, 1991, under the decree "On Termination of Activities of the USSR State Security Institutions in the Republic of Latvia".

== Key KGB officials in Latvia (1940–1991) ==
After the occupation of Latvia in June 1940, Soviet NKVD officers took control of the Latvian Republic’s Political Police Department. From June to August 1940, this department effectively functioned as the NKVD in Latvia.

In August 1940, Latvia’s government was reorganized to mirror the Soviet administrative model. By 1991, the majority of the Latvian SSR KGB archives—including personnel files—had been removed to Moscow.

The known heads of the Latvian SSR KGB and its predecessors were:

- Vikentijs Latkovskis – Chief of the Political Police under the Kirhenšteins government (1940)
- Semjons Šustins – Head of the State Security Directorate of the Latvian SSR NKVD (1940), later head of the People’s Commissariat for State Security (1941)
- Alfons Noviks (1940–1953) – People's Commissar of State Security of the Latvian SSR, from 1946 Minister of State Security of the Latvian SSR, Deputy Aleksejs Salomatovs (1944–1949), Andrejs Yefimovs (1947–1952) and Allaberts Vladimirs (1952-1953)
- Nikolajs Kovaļčuks (1953) – Minister of State Security of the LSSR, then Minister of Internal Affairs of the LSSR (transferred from Ukraine, temporarily replaced Alfons Novik after his dismissal during the chaotic period after Stalin's death)
- Jānis Vēvers (April 10, 1954 – January 30, 1963) – Chairman, Deputy Chairman of the State Security Committee of the Council of Ministers of the Latvian SSR Nikolajs Velikanovs (1954–1958), Mintauts Ziediņš (1954-1959), Vladimirs Sēja (1958);
- Longīns Avdjukēvičs (January 30, 1963 – November 21, 1981) – Chairman of the State Security Committee of the Council of Ministers of the Latvian SSR, from 1978 Chairman of the State Security Committee of the Latvian SSR, Deputy Jānis Lukaševičs (1963-1964 and 1969-1972), Jānis Rullis (1965–1968), Nikolajs Galkins (1969–1974), Yevgenijs Kravčenko (1974–1981), 1st Deputy Boriss Pugo (1977–1980);
- Boriss Pugo (November 21, 1981 – May 24, 1984) – Chairman of the State Security Committee of the Latvian SSR, First Deputy Boris Vasiliev (1981-1985);
- Staņislavs Zukulis (May 24, 1984 – March 15, 1990) – Chairman of the State Security Committee of the Latvian SSR, Deputy Edmunds Johansons (1986–1989), then Jānis Trubiņš (1989–1990)
- Edmunds Johansons (March 15, 1990 – August 24, 1991) – Last head of the KGB in Latvia.

== State Security Committee Archive ==
Also known in Latvian as "Čekas maisi" (Cheka's bags). The committee’s documents are systematically stored in eight collections at the Latvian National Archive’s Latvian State Archive. The main group of these documents consists of records detailing the Soviet totalitarian regime’s repressions against the people of Latvia.

According to the Latvian Law on the Preservation, Use, and Determination of Collaboration with the Former State Security Committee, documents classified as state secrets—such as the KGB agent registry—are maintained by the Constitution Protection Bureau, specifically its Center for Documenting the Consequences of Totalitarianism. Under this law, the scientific interdisciplinary research of these archival materials is overseen by the Government’s KGB Research Commission, which operates under the supervision of the Minister of Education and Science. The commission was established by the Cabinet of Ministers on August 5, 2014, and its research on KGB documents was to be completed by May 31, 2018.

On October 4, 2018, the Latvian Parliament 12th Saeima passed amendments to the law, which were signed into effect by President Raimonds Vējonis on October 16, 2018.

These amendments mandated the publication of the alphabetical and statistical registries of KGB agents, the records of freelance operational employees, and the KGB employee telephone directories containing information on official KGB personnel, along with descriptions available in the archive regarding the Central Committee of the Latvian Communist Party. The Center for Documenting the Consequences of Totalitarianism was required to hand over these documents to the Latvian National Archive by December 3, 2018, with publication on the archive’s website set for December 31, 2018.

=== Research on leading LPSR KGB officials ===
In 2016, Arturs Žvinklis, a member of the KGB Scientific Research Commission, published a study on 120 high-ranking LPSR KGB officials based on personnel files from the Latvian Communist Party’s Central Committee nomenclature.

The first NKVD group, consisting of Russian Latvians, was sent to Latvia even before the Soviet occupation—on June 11, 1940, following a one-month special training course in Russia. These operatives were assigned to the 3rd Army Military Council. After the formation of the Kirhenšteins government, the group took over the Political Police Department and began forming structures for the LPSR State Security Service.

In July 1940, former underground Latvian communists—many of whom had previously been imprisoned—were promoted to leading positions. For example:

- Alfons Noviks became head of the Daugavpils district Political Police in late June 1940
- Josifs Trukšāns took over in Rēzekne
- Jēkabs Šalms was assigned to Liepāja

During the final phase of World War II and in the first post-war years, the ranks of the LPSR State Security Service were reinforced with Latvian soldiers who had served in the Soviet Red Army.

Between 1948 and 1950, after completing higher operational training at the USSR Ministry of State Security (MGB) School, a new wave of security personnel was assigned to leadership positions within the LPSR Ministry of State Security. These officers had never worked in the KGB (Cheka) before, and none of them were Latvian or spoke Latvian.

A 1946 personnel assessment signed by Jānis Kalnbērziņš, First Secretary of the Latvian Communist Party Central Committee, concerning Alfons Noviks, Minister of State Security, noted:

"... The Ministry is still not fully staffed with personnel. Among security officers, only 23.3% are Latvian. The recruitment and preparation of new personnel is unsatisfactory. The ministry's leadership does not show enough demanding oversight toward employees who fail to improve their cultural and political education. Meanwhile, in the central administration of the ministry alone, 57.7% of employees have only the lowest level of education..."
