= Sangaste Parish =

Former municipality of Estonia

Coordinates: 57°55′31″N 26°18′54″E

Sangaste Parish Sangaste vald
- Former municipality of Estonia
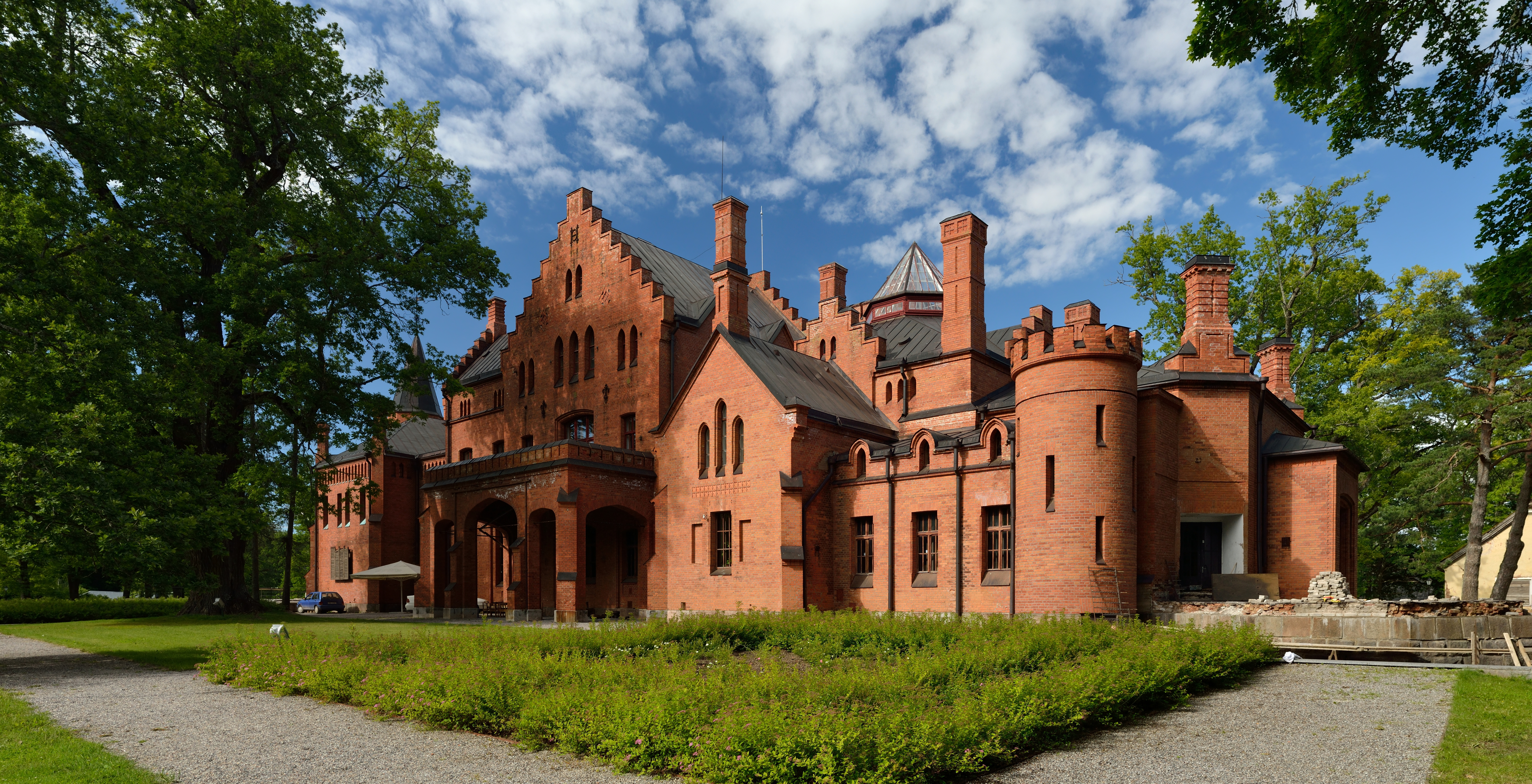
- Sangaste manor

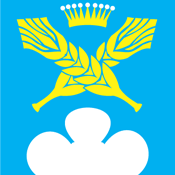
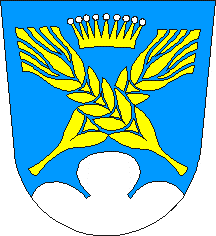
- Flag Coat of arms

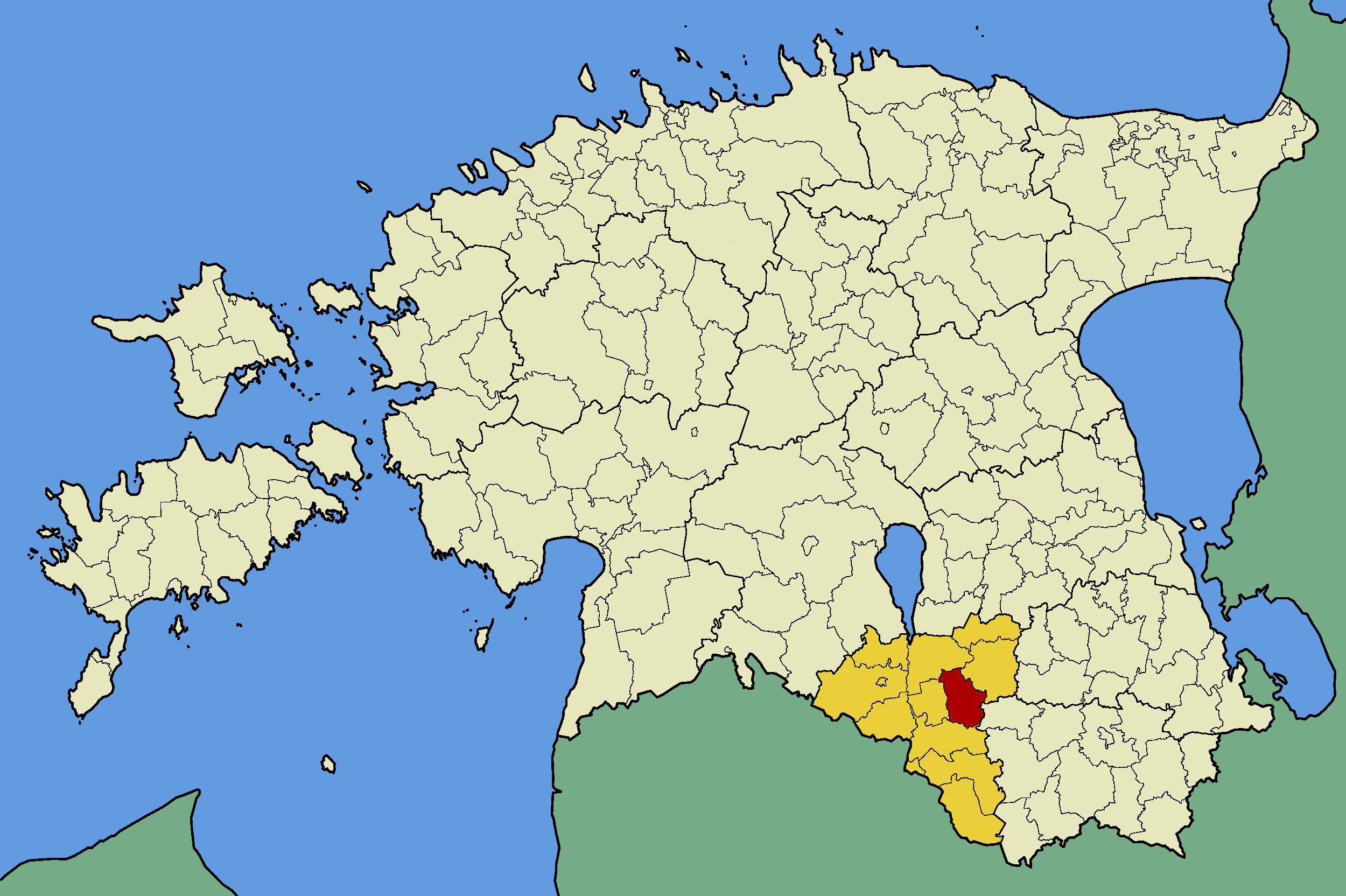
- Sangaste Parish within Valga County.
- Country: Estonia
- County: Valga County
- Administrative centre: Sangaste

Government
  - Mayor: Kaido Tamberg (Social Democrates)

Area
  - Total: 144.72 km^{2} (55.88 sq mi)

Population (01.01.2010)
  - Total: 1,464
  - Density: 10.12/km^{2} (26.20/sq mi)
- Website: www.sangaste.ee

Sangaste Parish (Estonian: Sangaste Vald) was a rural municipality of the Estonian county of Valga with a population of 1,464 (as of 1 January 2010) and an area of 144.72 km^{2}.

Sangaste features attractions, including the Sangaste Castle, where Friedrich Wilhelm Rembert von Berg (1793–1874), the Governor-General of Finland (1855–1861), was born. It has a hotel and a restaurant. Sangaste is also the birthplace of the Estonian writer August Gailit (1891–1960) and Estonian opera singer Aarne Viisimaa (1898–1989).

The village was first mentioned in 1272 as Toyvel.

The mayor of Sangaste Parish is Kaido Tamberg from the Social Democratic Party.

== Settlements ==
Small borough

Sangaste

Villages

Ädu - Keeni - Kurevere - Lauküla - Lossiküla - Mäeküla - Mägiste - Pringi - Restu - Risttee - Sarapuu - Tiidu - Vaalu
