= Puka Parish =

Former municipality of Estonia

Coordinates: 58°02′59″N 26°13′35″E

Puka Parish Puka vald
- Municipality of Estonia
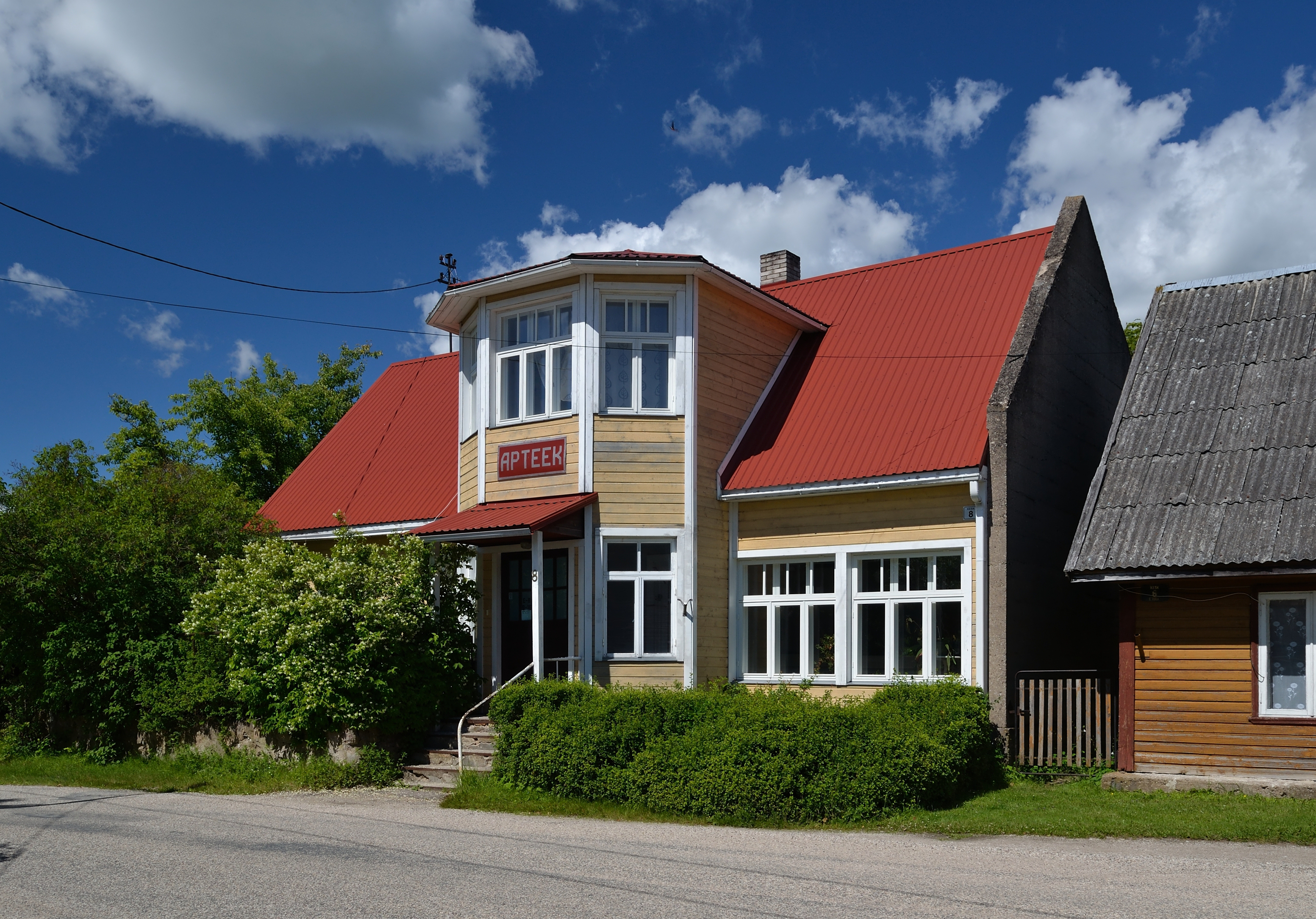
- Pharmacy in Puka

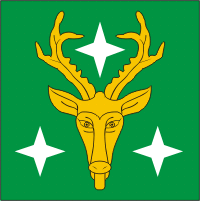
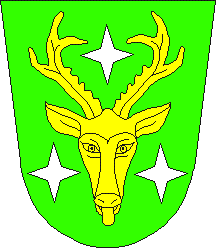
- Flag Coat of arms

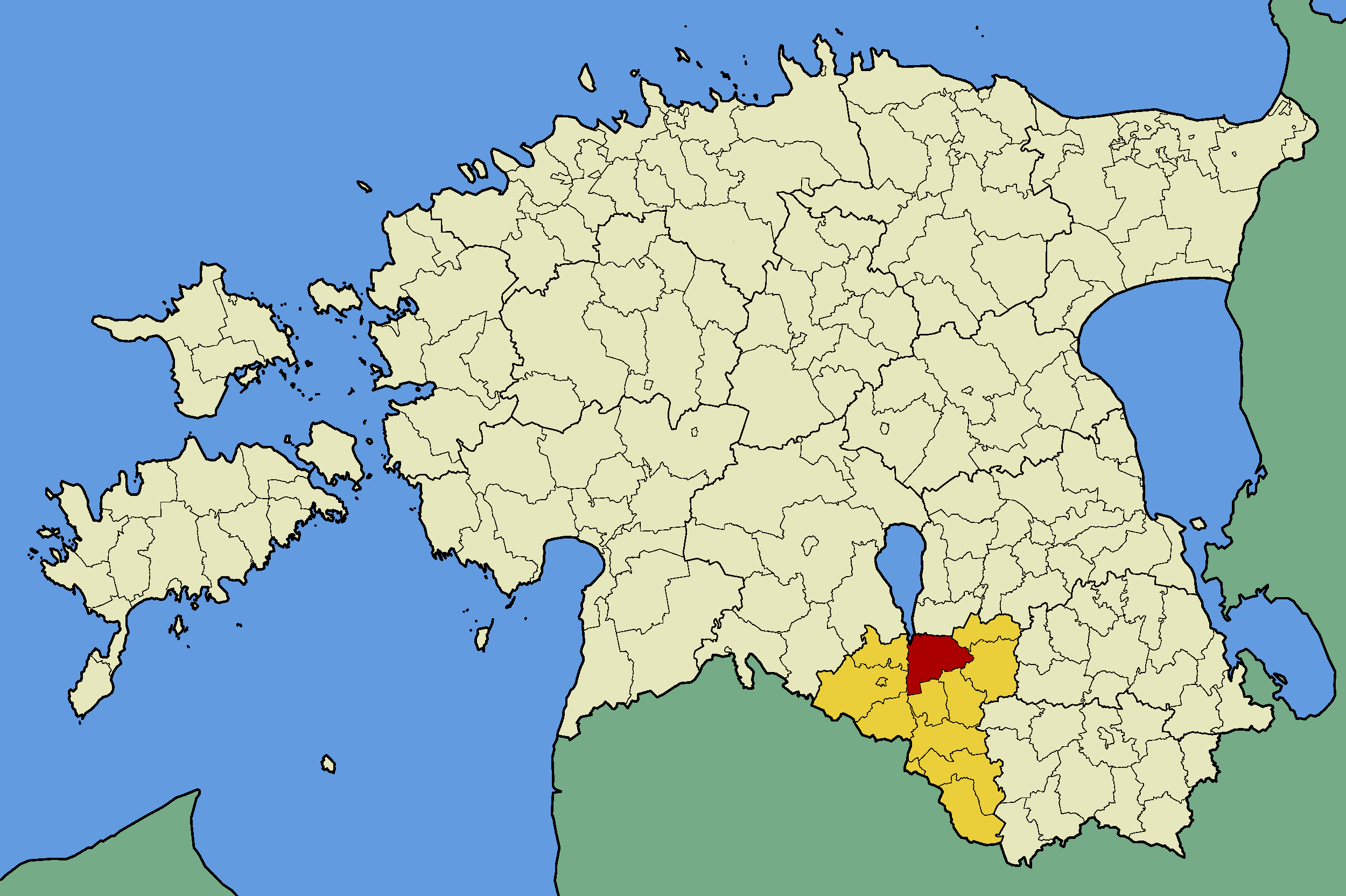
- Puka Parish within Valga County.
- Country: Estonia
- County: Valga County
- Administrative centre: Puka

Area
  - Total: 200.9 km^{2} (77.6 sq mi)

Population (01.01.2006)
  - Total: 1,881
  - Density: 9.363/km^{2} (24.25/sq mi)
- Website: www.puka.ee

Puka Parish was a rural municipality of the Estonian county of Valga.

== Settlements ==
Small borough

Puka

Villages

Aakre - Kähri - Kibena - Kolli - Komsi - Kuigatsi - Meegaste - Palamuste - Pedaste - Plika - Põru - Prange - Pühaste - Purtsi - Rebaste - Ruuna - Soontaga - Vaardi

== Gallery ==
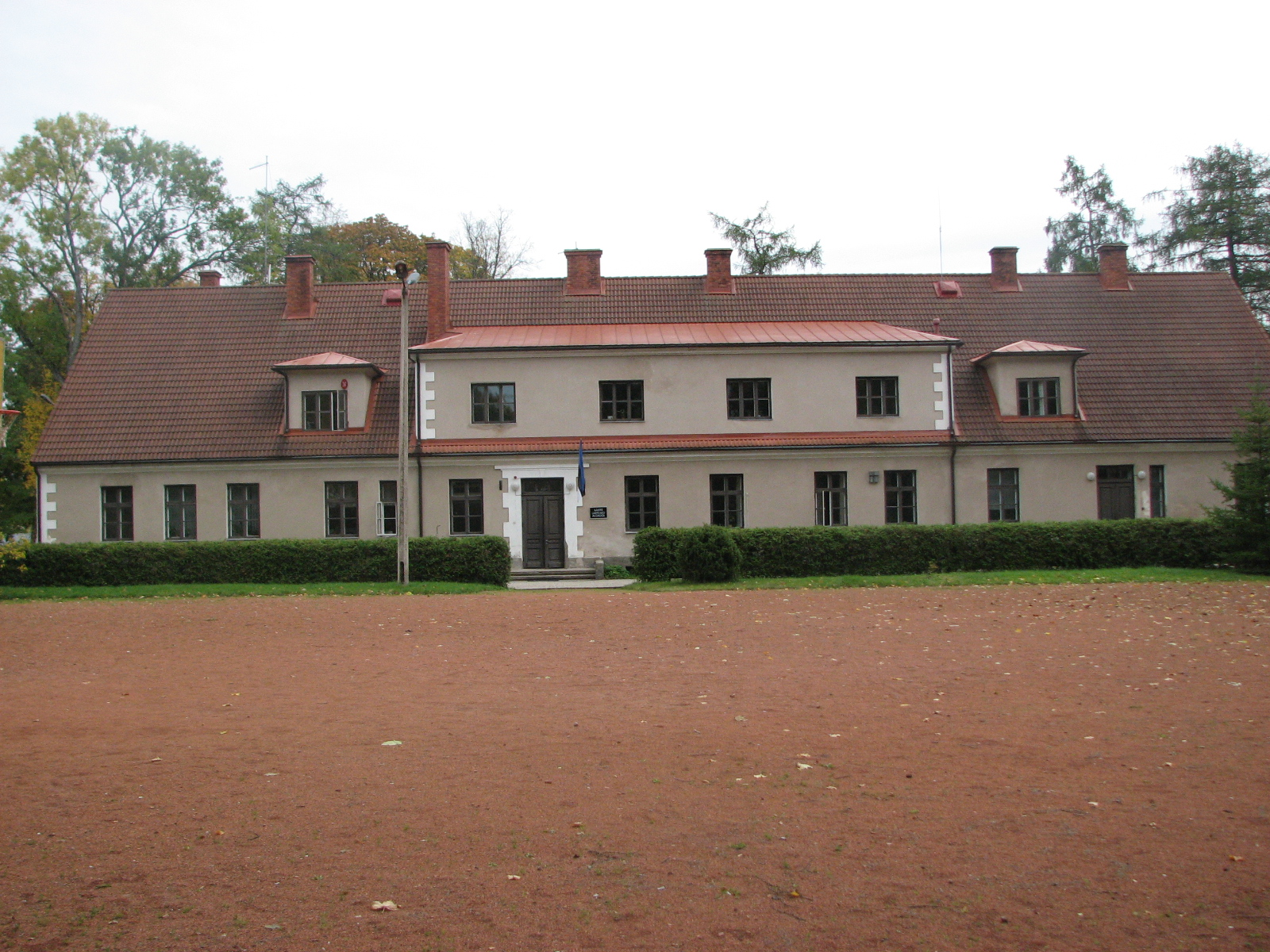
Aakre manor

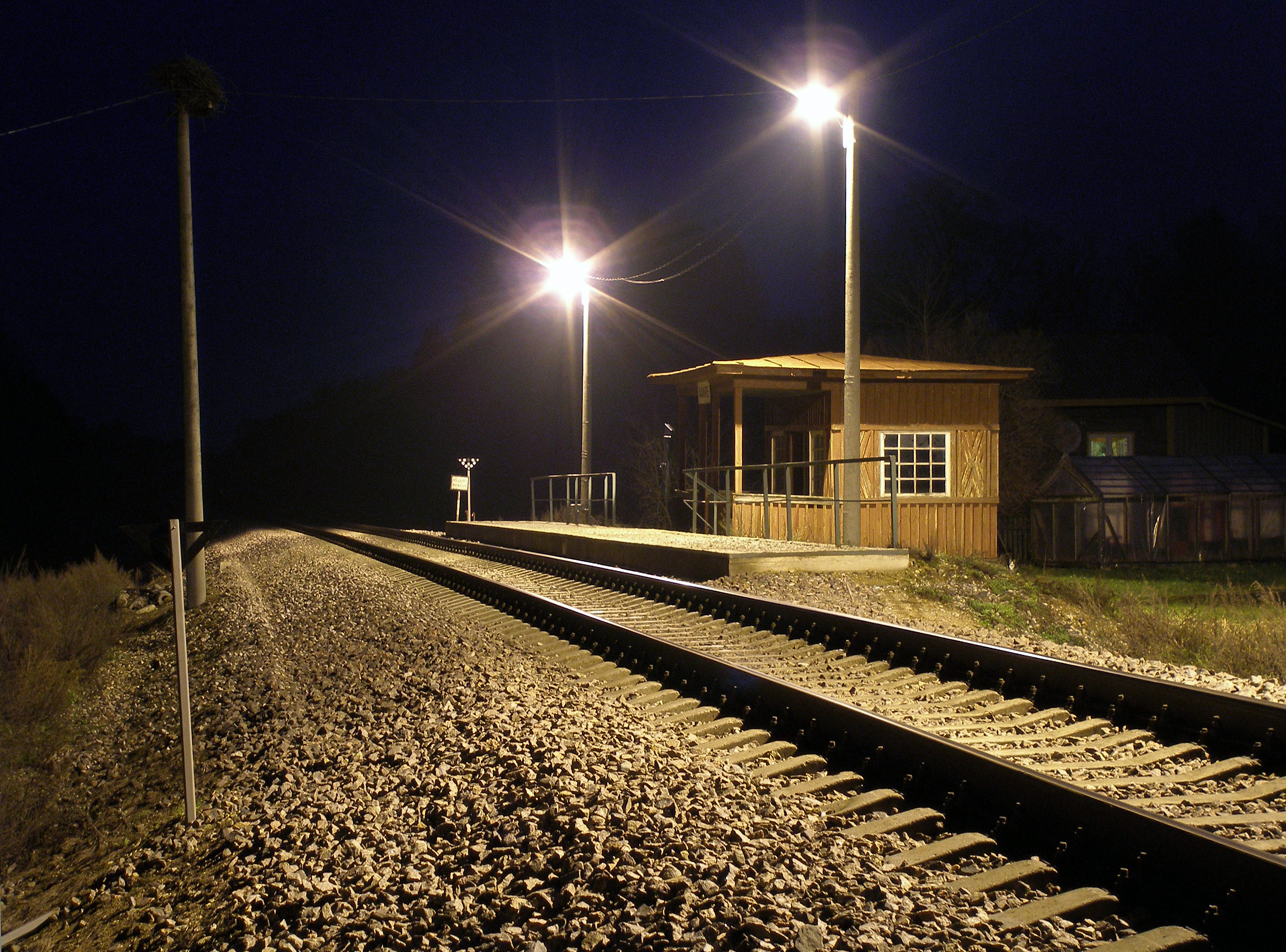
Aakre train station

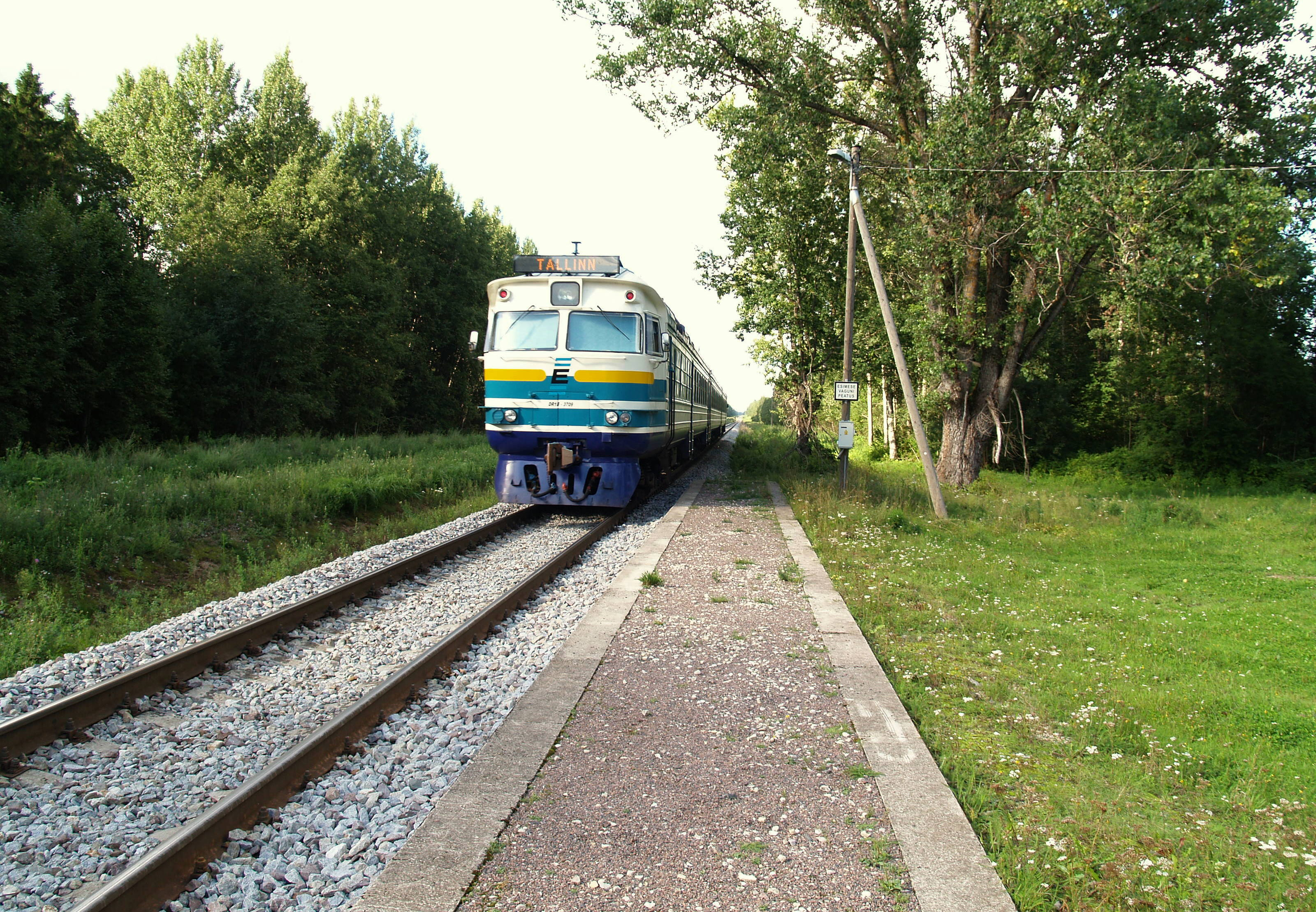
Tallinn train in Mägise train station

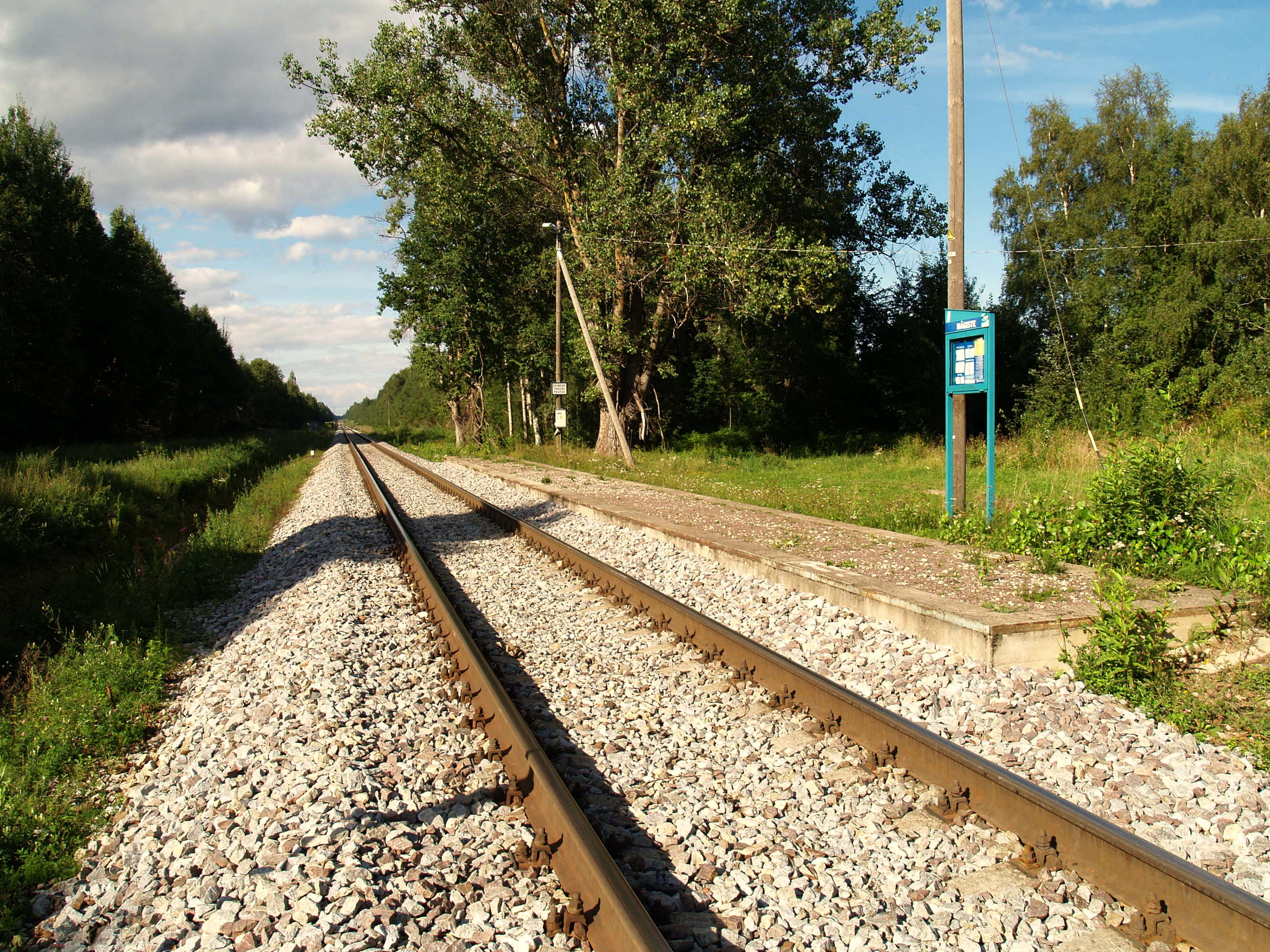
Mägise train station
