= Lake Kauru =

Lake in Estonia

- Kauru järv (Estonian)
- Location within Estonia
- Coordinates: 57°58′29″N 26°29′24″E
- Basin countries: Estonia
- Max. length: 400 meters (1,300 ft)
- Surface area: 7.0 hectares (17 acres)
- Max. depth: 2.7 meters (8 ft 10 in)
- Shore length^{1}: 1,100 meters (3,600 ft)
- Surface elevation: 132.8 meters (436 ft)
- ^{1} Shore length is not a well-defined measure.

Lake Kauru (Estonian: Kauru järv, also Ilmjärv) is a lake in Estonia. It is located in the village of Kaurutootsi in Otepää Parish, Valga County.

== Physical description ==
The lake has an area of 7.0 hectares (17 acres). The lake has a maximum depth of 2.7 meters (8 ft 10 in). It is 400 meters (1,300 ft) long, and its shoreline measures 1,100 meters (3,600 ft).

== See also ==
- List of lakes of Estonia
