= Hermann Lerchenbaum =

Estonian-American rower

Hermann Lerchenbaum (18 November 1862 Keeni, Sangaste Church Parish – 20 June 1942 Annapolis, USA) was an Estonian-American rower. He was probably the first Estonian athlete who participated in the 1896 Olympic Games. He was a member of the United States Navy rowing team, but due to a storm, the competition was cancelled.
