= Puka, Estonia =

Borough in Estonia

Puka
- Small borough
- Location in Estonia
- Coordinates: 58°3′11″N 26°14′28″E
- Country: Estonia
- County: Valga County
- Municipality: Otepää Parish

Population (2011 Census)
  - Total: 580

Puka (German: Bockenhof) is a small borough (Estonian: alevik) in Otepää Parish, Valga County, southern Estonia. It was the administrative centre of Puka Parish until 2017. At the 2011 Census, the settlement's population was 580.

Architect Georg Hellat (1870–1943) was born in Puka.

On 1 May 1897, a military train derailed 3 km north of Puka. Fifty-eight people were killed and forty-four badly injured in the accident.

== Gallery ==
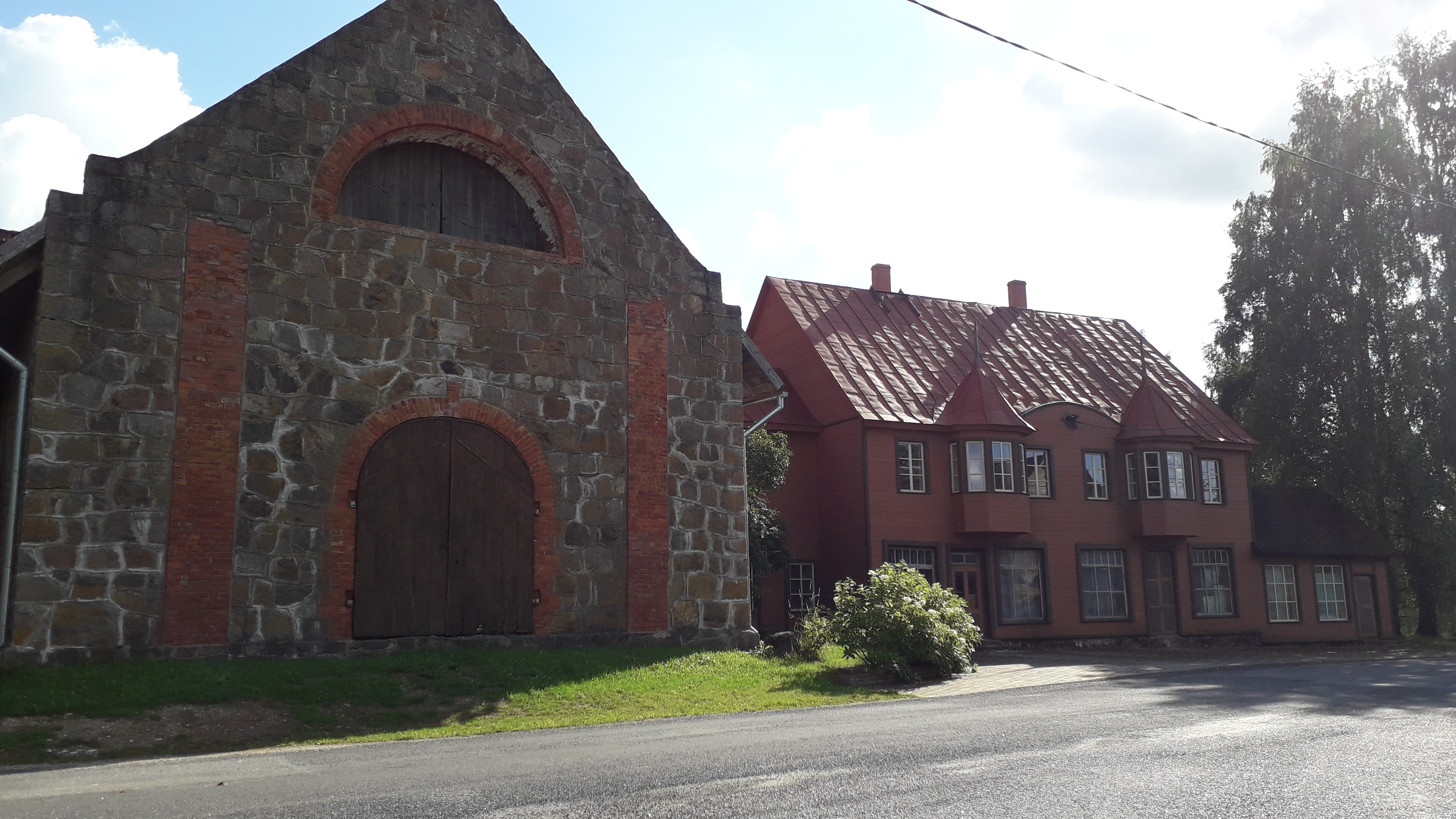
Puka, central part

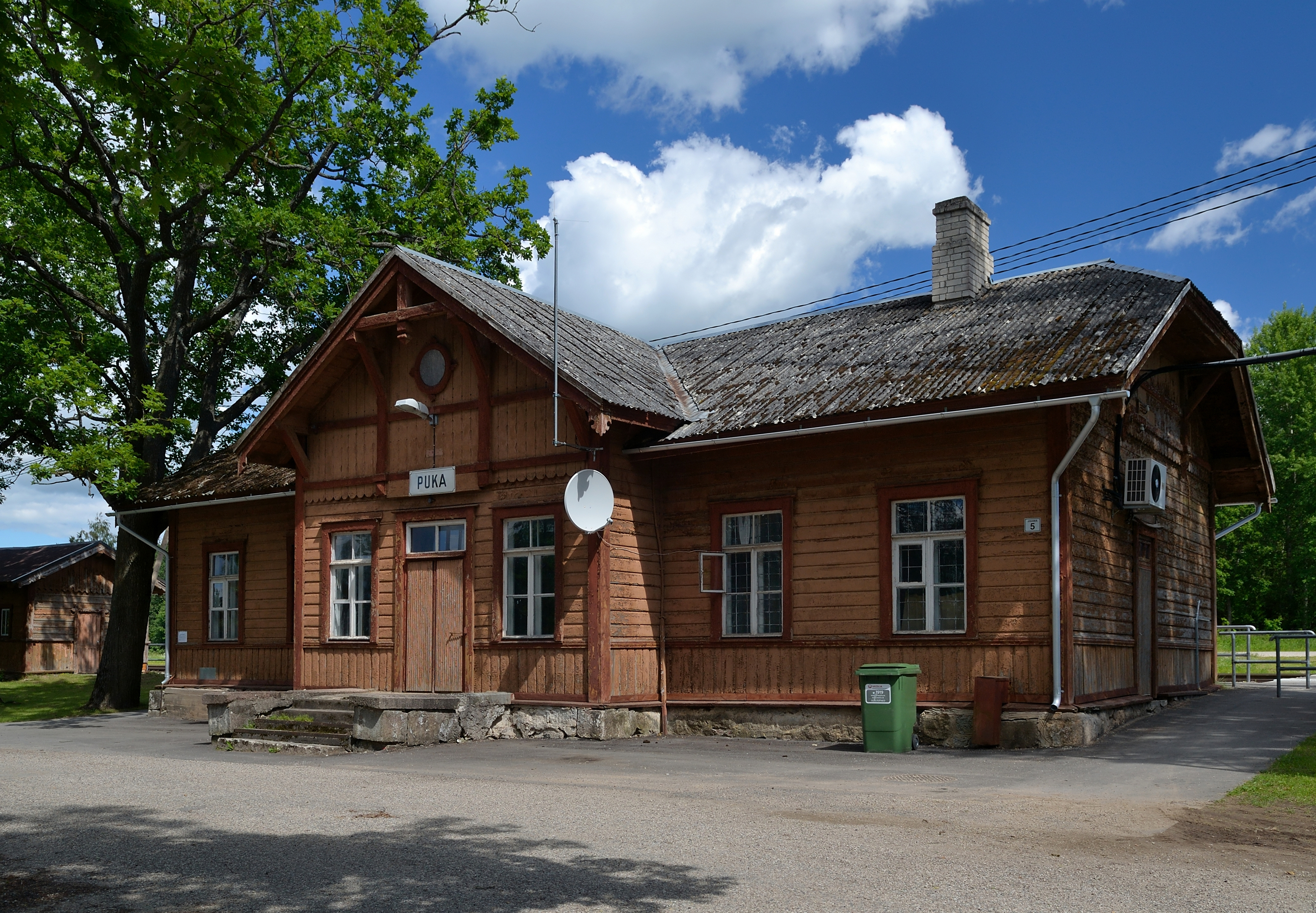
Railway station

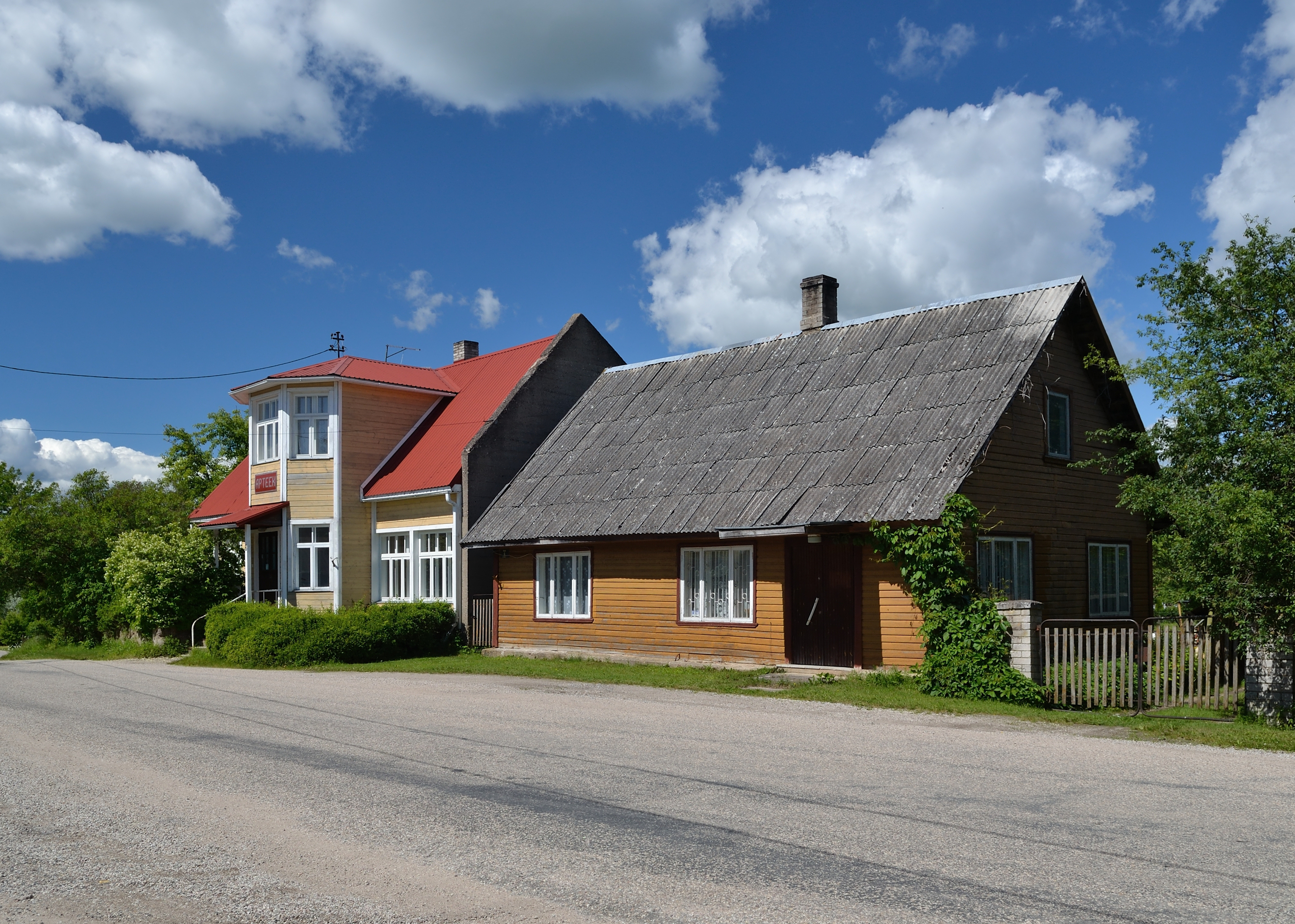

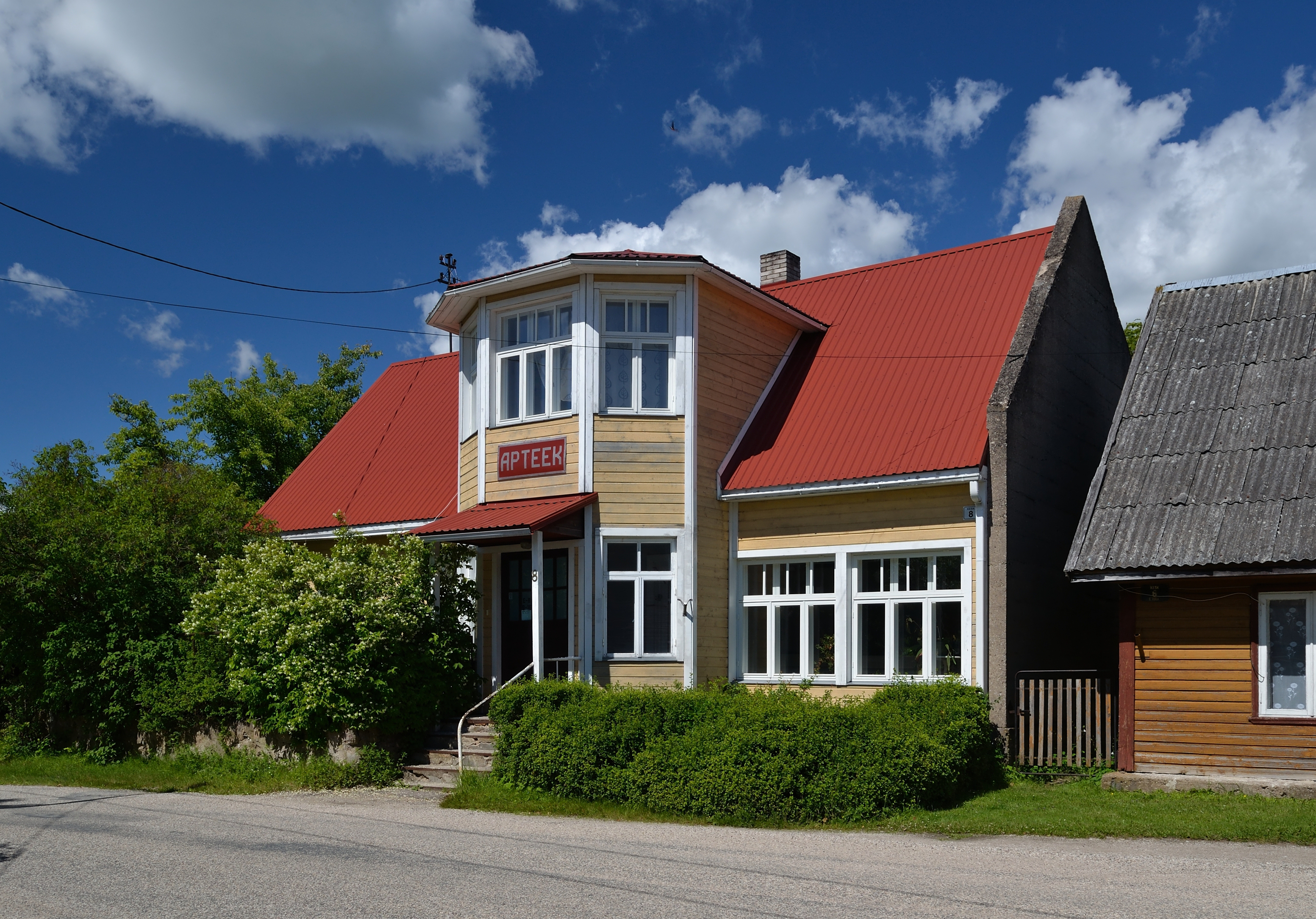
Pharmacy-house in Puka

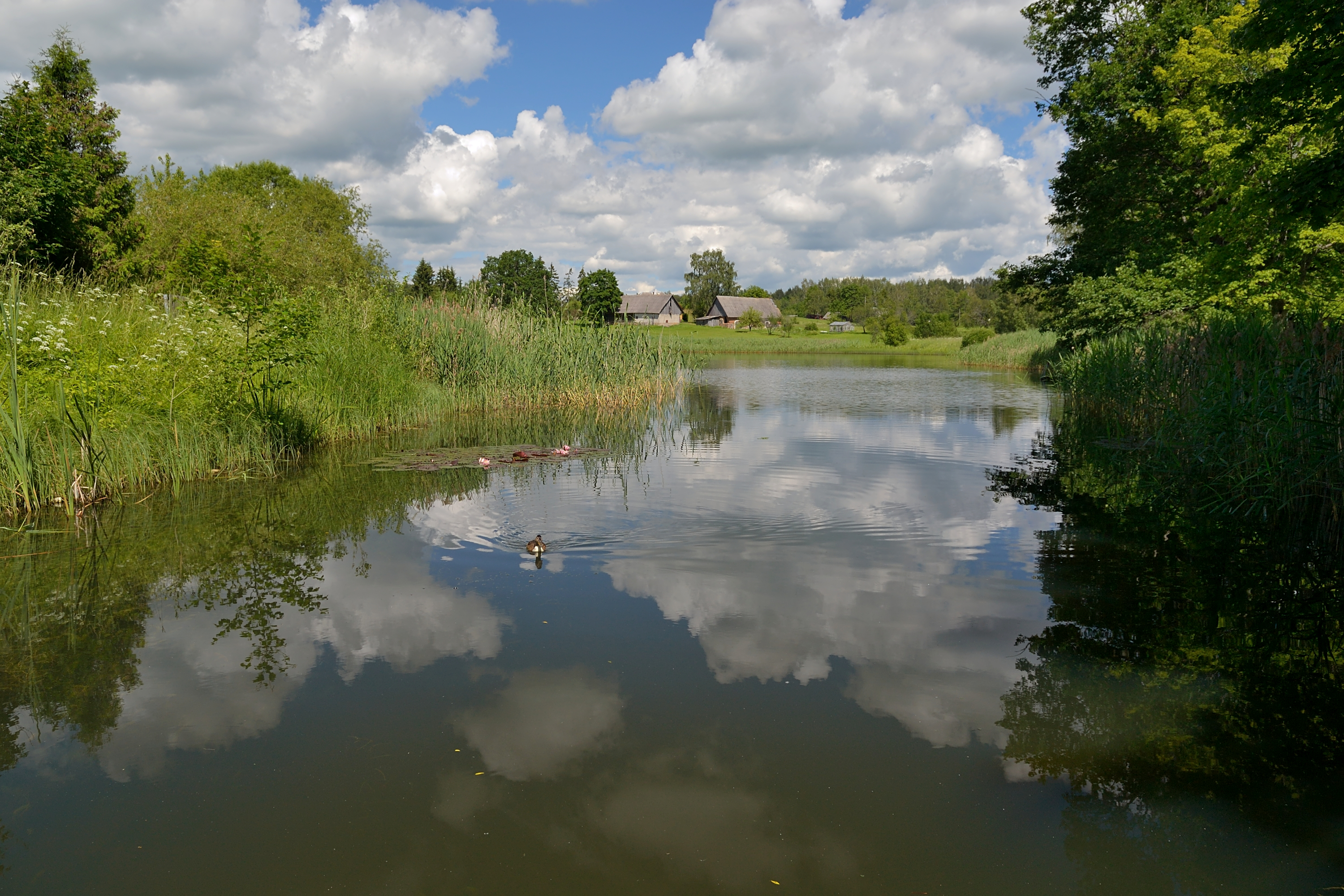
Reservoir

| Preceding station | Elron | Following station |
|---|---|---|
| Palupera towards Tallinn | Tallinn–Tartu–Valga | Mägiste towards Valga |
