= Jaan Raudsepp =

Estonian politician

Jaan Raudsepp (15 August 1873 in Vaalu – 16 March 1945 in Dresden, Germany) was an Estonian politician.

In 1932 he was Minister of Roads. Raudsepp fled the Soviet occupation of Estonia as a refugees in 1944 for Germany and was killed in an Allied air raid in Dresden in 1945 aged 71.
