= Pilkuse =

Village in Estonia

- Village
- Location within Estonia
- Coordinates: 58.0514°N 26.5367°E
- Country: Estonia
- County: Valga County
- Parish: Otepää Parish
- Time zone: UTC+2 (EET)
  - Summer (DST): UTC+3 (EEST)

Pilkuse (German: Bremenhof) is a village in Otepää Parish, Valga County in Estonia.
