= Pedajamäe =

Village in Estonia

- Village
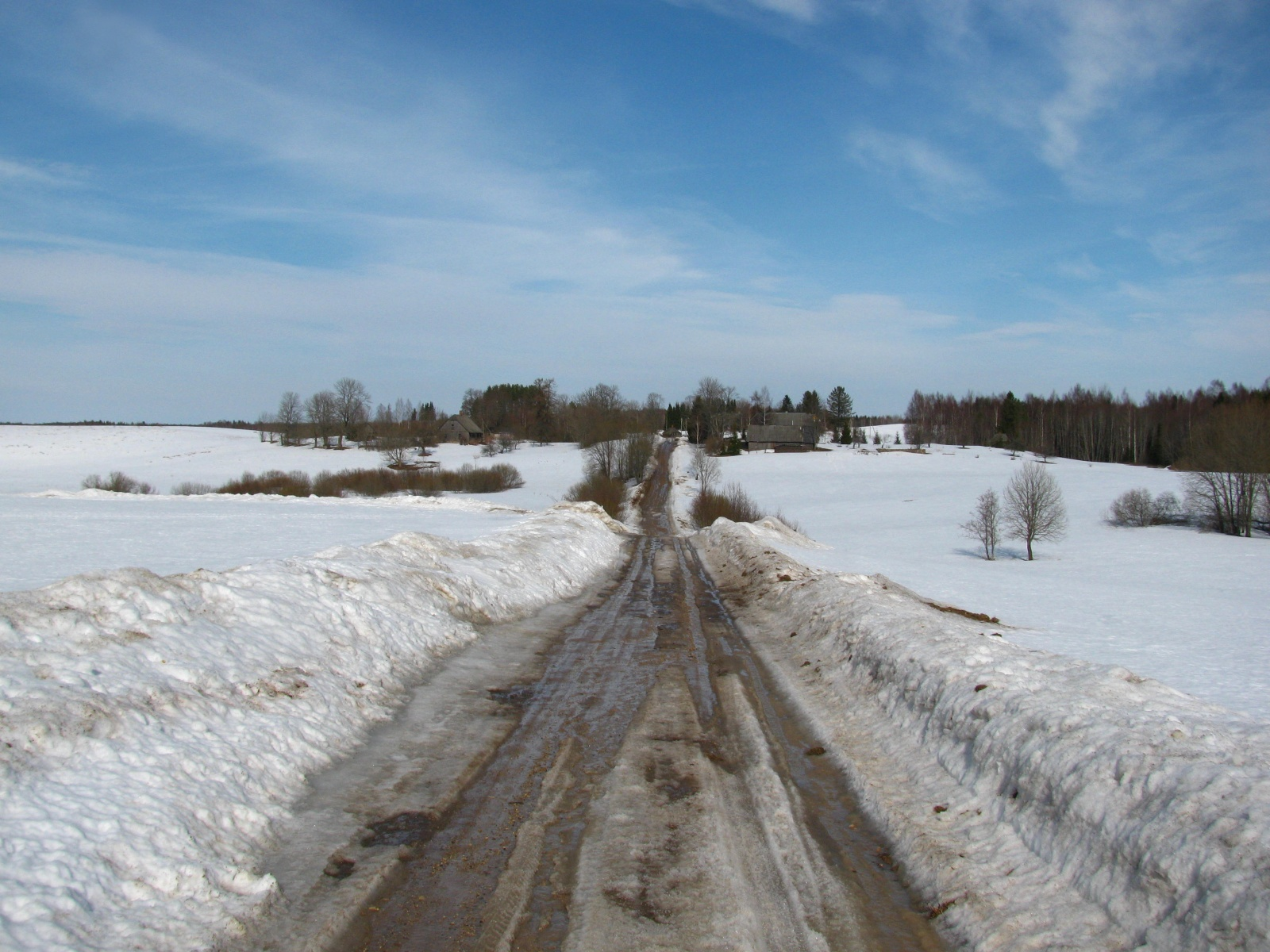
- Landscape in Pedajamäe

- Location within Estonia
- Coordinates: 58.0714°N 26.4408°E
- Country: Estonia
- County: Valga County
- Parish: Otepää Parish

Area
  - Total: 9.3 km^{2} (3.6 sq mi)

Population
  - Total: 90
- Time zone: UTC+2 (EET)
  - Summer (DST): UTC+3 (EEST)

Pedajamäe is a village in Otepää Parish, Valga County in Estonia.
