= Räbi =

Village in Estonia

- village
- Location in Estonia
- Coordinates: 58°07′25″N 26°26′38″E
- Country: Estonia
- County: Valga County
- Municipality: Otepää Parish

Population (01.01.2011)
  - Total: 58

Räbi is a village in Otepää Parish, Valga County in southeastern Estonia. It's located about 6.5 km (4 mi) north of the town of Otepää. Räbi has a population of 58 (as of 1 January 2011).

Räbi Lake and Päidla Väikejärv are located in the village.

== Räbi Lake ==
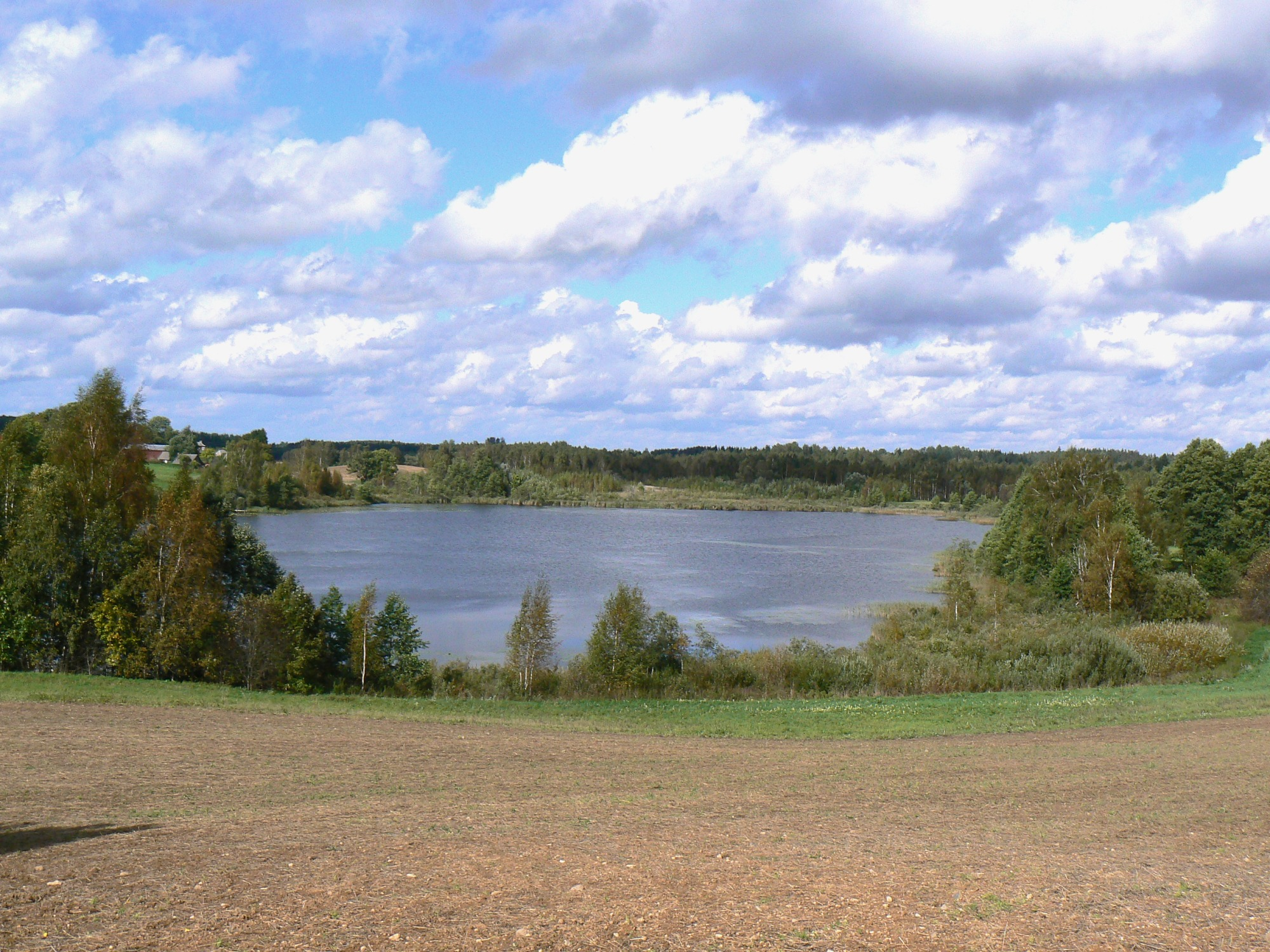

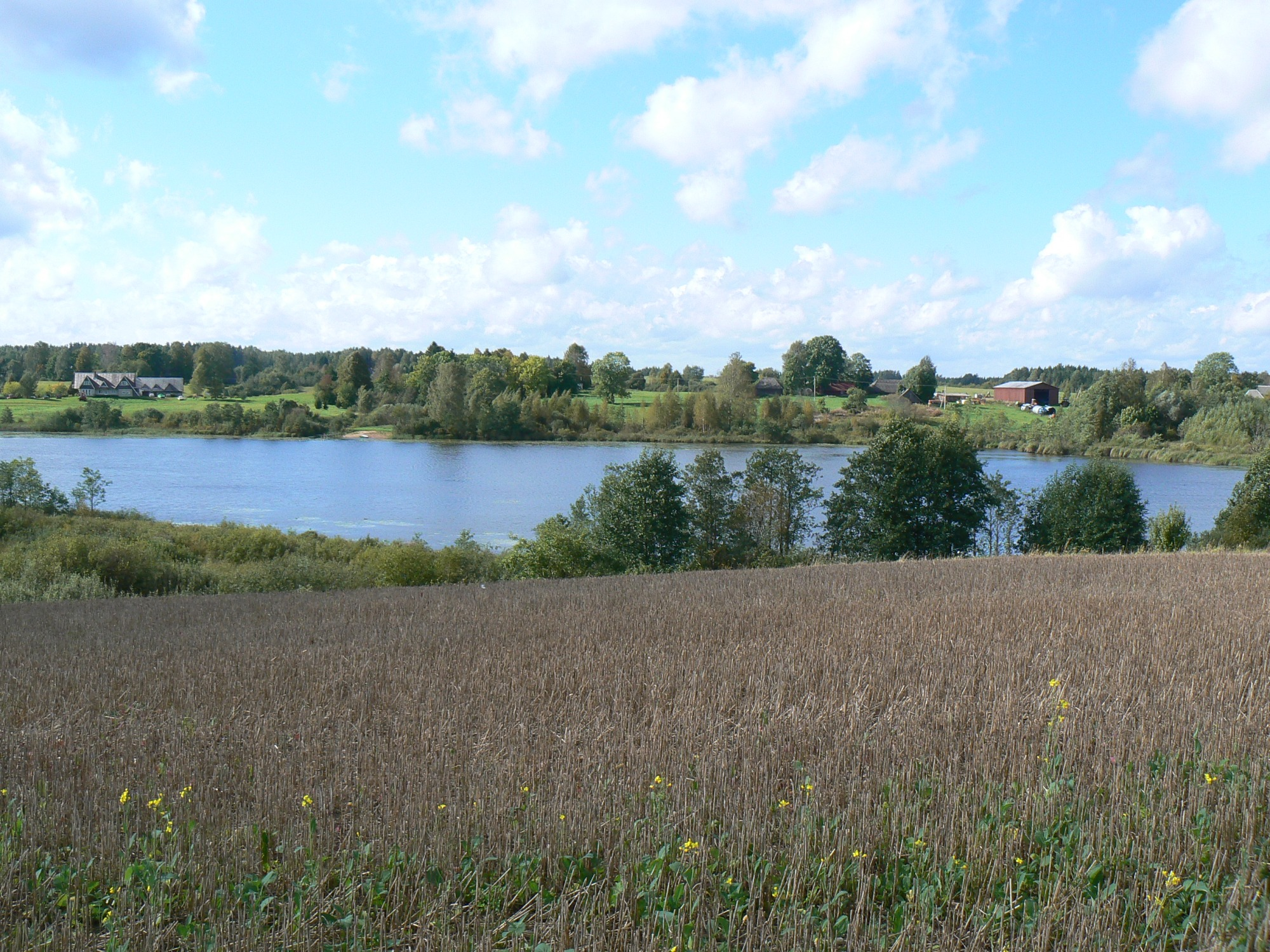
