= Kastolatsi =

Village in Estonia

- Village
- Location in Estonia
- Coordinates: 58°05′03″N 26°28′51″E
- Country: Estonia
- County: Valga County
- Municipality: Otepää Parish

Population (07.02.2008)
  - Total: 65

Kastolatsi (German: Kastolatz) is a village in Otepää Parish, Valga County in southeastern Estonia. It has a population of 65 (as of 7 February 2008).

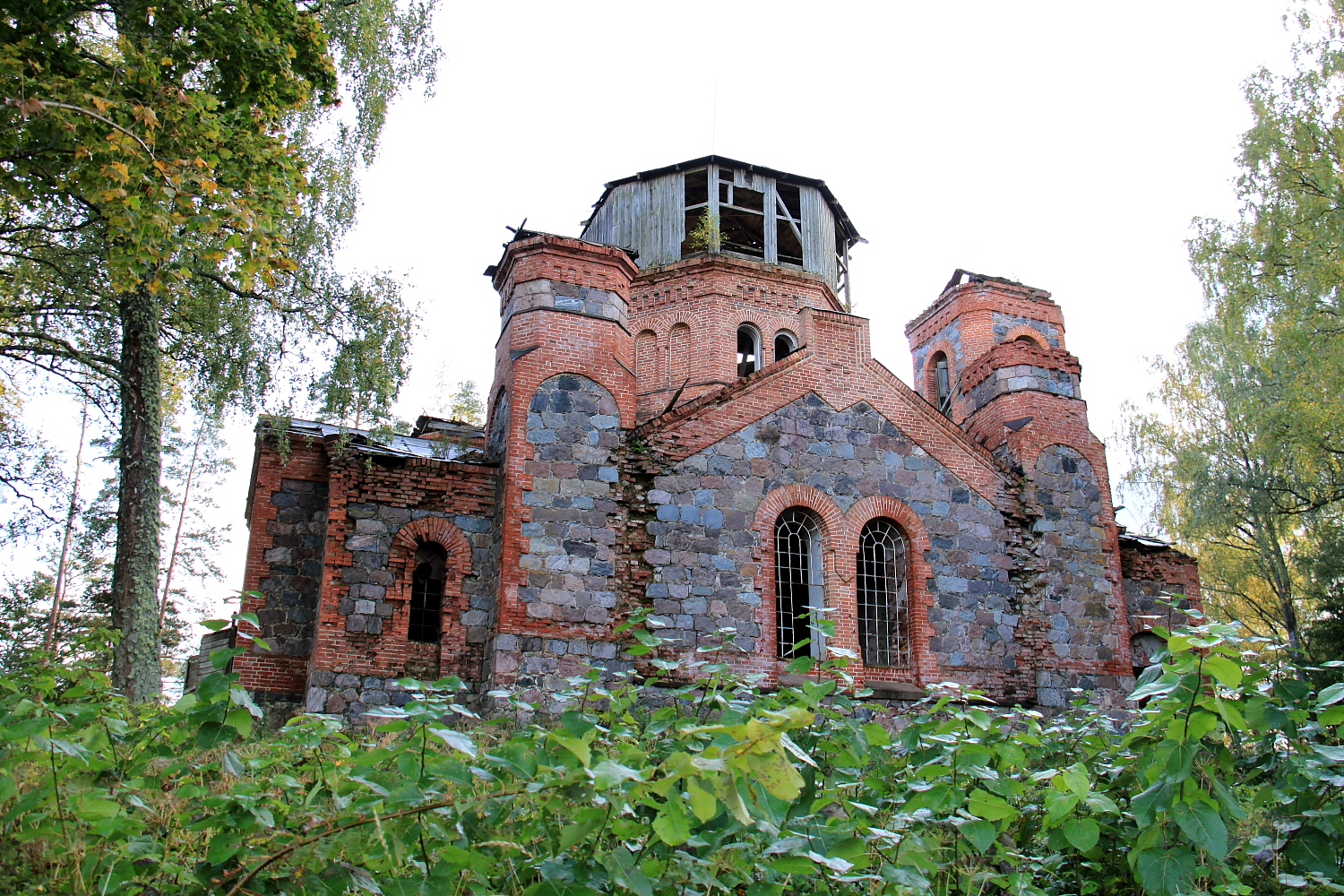
Ruins of Kastolatsi Orthodox Church in Kastolatsi.
