= Makita, Estonia =

Village in Estonia

Makita
- Village
- Location in Estonia
- Coordinates: 58°09′16″N 26°33′00″E
- Country: Estonia
- County: Valga County
- Municipality: Otepää Parish
- Official village: 2007

Area
  - Total: 4.20 km^{2} (1.62 sq mi)

Population (01.01.2011)
  - Total: 22
  - Density: 5.2/km^{2} (14/sq mi)

Makita is a village in Otepää Parish, Valga County in southeastern Estonia. It is located about 10 km (6 mi) southeast of the town of Elva and about 11 km (7 mi) north of the town of Otepää. Makita has a population of 22 (as of 1 January 2011).
