= Otepää Parish =

Municipality of Estonia (2017)

Coordinates: 58°03′N 26°29′E

Otepää Parish Otepää vald
- Municipality of Estonia
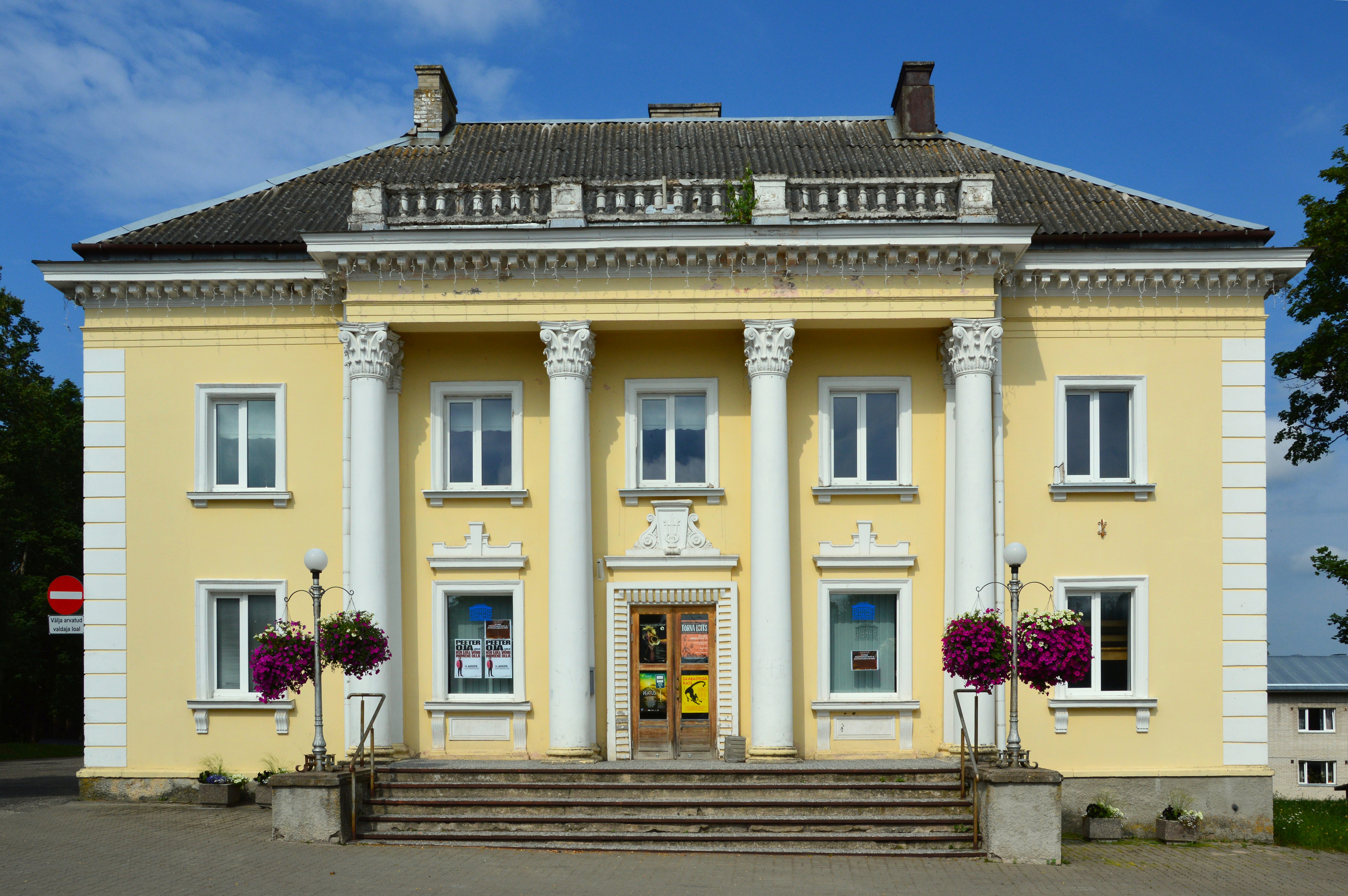
- Otepää Cultural Building

- Flag Coat of arms

- Otepää Parish within Valga County.
- Country: Estonia
- County: Valga County
- Administrative centre: Otepää

Government
  - Mayor: Jorma Riivald

Area
  - Total: 520 km^{2} (200 sq mi)

Population (1 January 2019)
  - Total: 6,456
  - Density: 12/km^{2} (32/sq mi)
- ISO 3166 code: EE-557
- Website: www.otepaa.ee

Otepää Parish (Estonian: Otepää vald) is a rural municipality in Valga County, southern Estonia. It includes the town of Otepää, which is referred to as the "winter capital" of Estonia.

The parish was formed in 2017 by merging of the former Otepää Parish, Sangaste Parish, 7 villages of Palupera Parish, and 12 villages of Puka Parish.

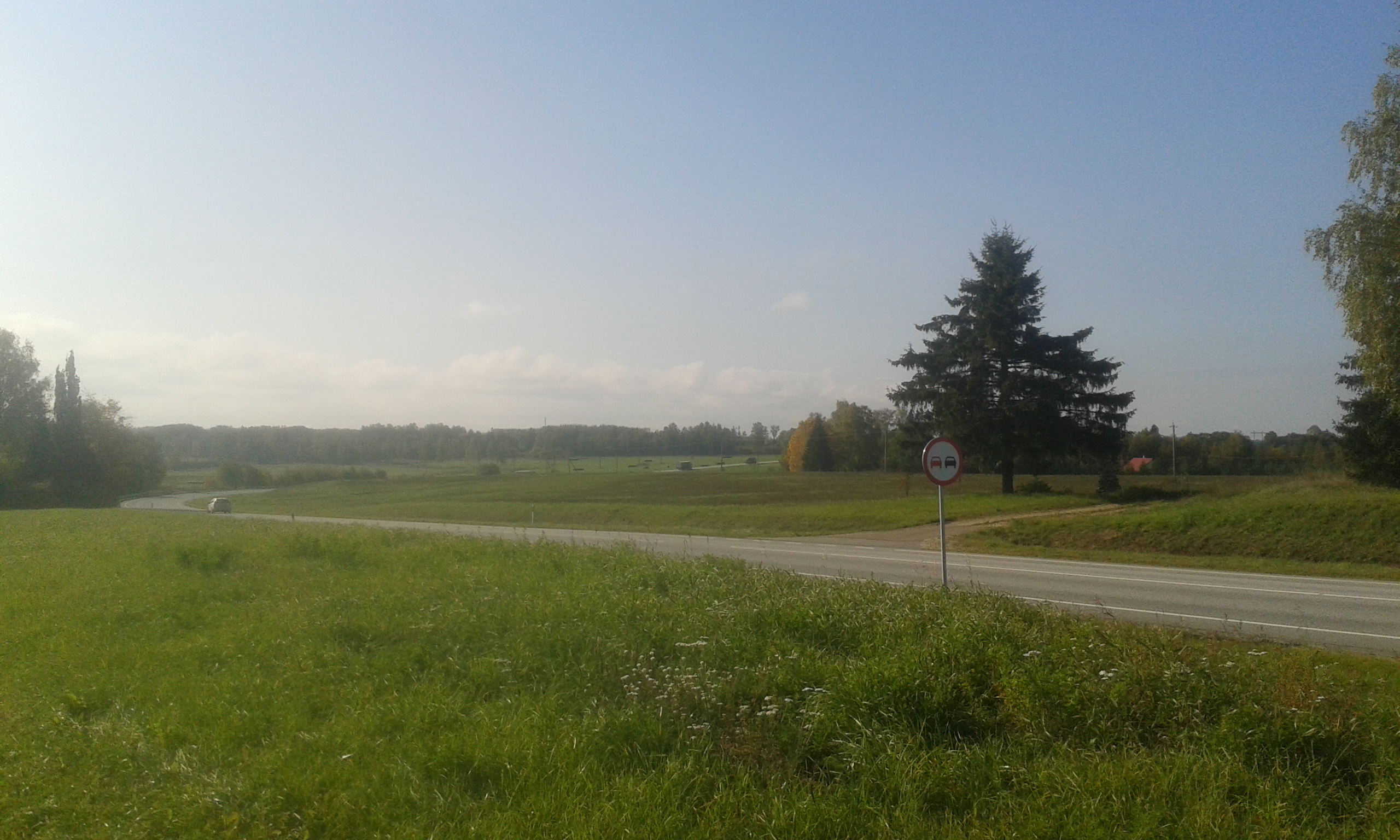
Riga-Tartu road in Otepää parish

== Settlements ==
The parish has one town, two small boroughs and 52 villages.

Town

Otepää

Small boroughs

Puka - Sangaste

Villages

Ädu - Arula- Ilmjärve - Kääriku - Kähri - Kassiratta - Kastolatsi - Kaurutootsi - Keeni - Kibena - Koigu - Kolli - Komsi - Kuigatsi - Kurevere - Lauküla - Lossiküla - Lutike - Mäeküla - Mägestiku - Mägiste - Mäha - Märdi - Makita - Meegaste - Miti - Neeruti - Nõuni - Nüpli - Otepää küla - Pedajamäe - Päidla - Pilkuse - Plika - Põru - Prange - Pringi - Pühajärve - Räbi - Raudsepa - Restu - Risttee - Ruuna - Sarapuu - Sihva - Tiidu - Tõutsi -Truuta - Vaalu - Vaardi - Vana-Otepää - Vidrike

=== Neighboring parishes ===
Elva, Nõo, Kambja, Kanepi, Antsla, Valga ja Tõrva vald.

Religion in Otepää Parish (2021)
1. Unaffiliated (84.6%)
2. Lutheran (9.00%)
3. Orthodox (2.00%)
4. Others Christians (0.50%)
5. Others Religions (1.30%)
6. Unknown (2.60%)

== Notable people ==
- Friedrich Wilhelm Rembert von Berg (1793 in Sangaste Castle –1874), Baltic German Field Marshal, Governor-General of Finland
- Aleksander Eduard Thomson (1845 in Pringi – 1917), composer, a founder of the folk music choral tradition in Estonia
- Kaarel Parts (1873 in Otepää Parish – 1940), lawyer, judge and politician; Chief Justice of Estonia, 1919 to 1940
- August Gailit (1891 in Kuiksilla – 1960), writer, influenced by neo-romanticism
- Yri Naelapea (1896 in Arula – 1969), writer, journalist, and publisher.
- Aarne Viisimaa (1898 in Sangaste – 1989), operatic tenor, opera director; director of the Estonian National Opera, 1927 to 1944
- Friedrich Kurg (1898 in Sangaste Parish – 1945), a military major and a Forest Brother partisan.
- August Englas (1925 in Pühajärve Parish – 2017), wrestler, won fourth place at the 1952 Summer Olympics
- Mats Traat (1936 in Arula – 2022), poet, poetry translator, author; also a singer and an actor.
- Harri Õunapuu (born 1947 in Sangaste Parish), agronomist and politician. Governor of Rapla County, 1989 to 1991; Minister of Finance, 2002 to 2003.
- Madis Vihmann (born 1995 in Sangaste), footballer who played over 170 games and 19 for Estonia

== See also ==
- Tehvandi Sports Center
