= Koigu, Valga County =

Village in Estonia

Koigu
- Village
- Location in Estonia
- Coordinates: 57°58′11″N 26°34′11″E
- Country: Estonia
- County: Valga County
- Municipality: Otepää Parish

Population (07.02.2008)
  - Total: 23

Koigu is a small village in Otepää Parish, Valga County in southeastern Estonia. It has a population of only 23 residents (as of February 7, 2008).
