= Vidrike =

Village in Estonia

- Village
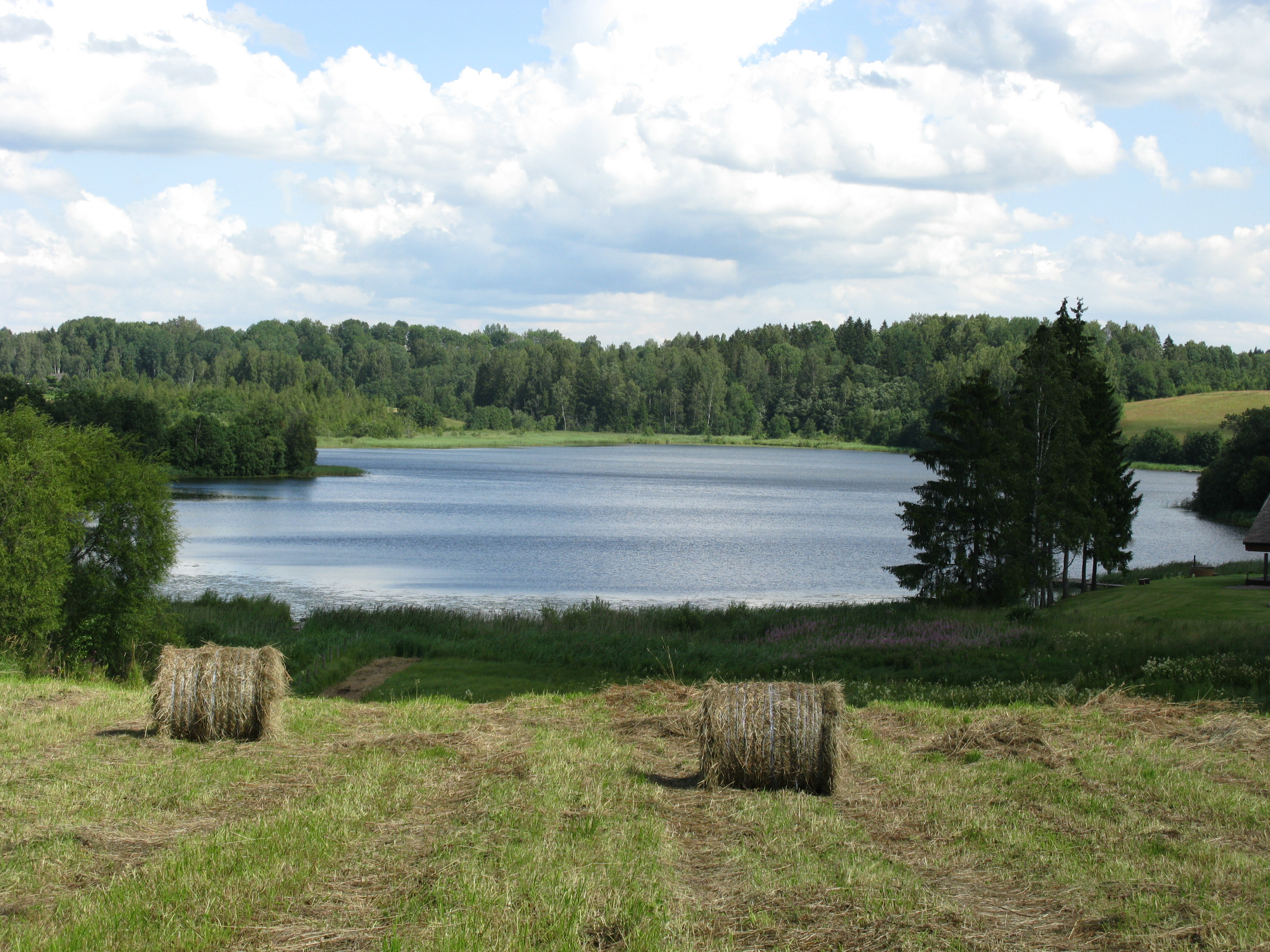
- Lake Vidrike

- Location within Estonia
- Coordinates: 57.99°N 26.524444444444°E
- Country: Estonia
- County: Valga County
- Parish: Otepää Parish
- Time zone: UTC+2 (EET)
  - Summer (DST): UTC+3 (EEST)

Vidrike is a village in Otepää Parish, Valga County in Estonia.
