= Aleksander Eduard Thomson =

Estonian composer

Aleksander Eduard Thomson (31 January 1845, in Pringi – 20 October 1917, in Petrograd) was an Estonian composer. He is regarded as the founder of Estonian national choral music.

In 1865, he graduated from Latvian musical pedagogue Jānis Cimze's seminar in Valga. From 1870 to 1872 he studied mathematics at the University of Tartu. He then worked as a teacher in Kanepi and Vana-Võidu near Viljandi and in the German church school in Petergof, Russia. At that time he was already organizing choral events with a relatively large number of participants.

Thomson is considered to be one of the founders of the folk music choral tradition in Estonia. He had written about 70 choral songs, of which best known are "Kannel" ('Kantele') and "Laula, laula, suukene" ('Sing, sing o mouth'). Many of his songs are based on folk tunes. He often took the texts of his songs from folk poetry, but also from the works of Carl Robert Jakobson, Lydia Koidula and Friedrich Robert Faehlmann. During arranging the songs, he tried to remove anything related to German.

Thomson married Ida Alvine Jakobson, who was the sister of Estonian writer, politician and teacher Carl Robert Jakobson.

== Songs ==
- "Kantele"
- "Sing, sing o mouth"
- "Kannel"
- "Laula, laula, suukene"
- "Arg kosilane"
- "Ketra Liisu"
- "Pulmalaul"
- "Sokukene"
- "Tantsulaul"
- "Oh mu armas isamaja"
- "Mardilaul"
- "Rootsi rahvaviis"
- "Suur on, Jumal, Su ramm"
