= Raudsepa, Valga County =

Village in Estonia

Raudsepa
- Village
- Location in Estonia
- Coordinates: 57°59′31″N 26°27′16″E
- Country: Estonia
- County: Valga County
- Municipality: Otepää Parish

Population (07.02.2008)
  - Total: 37

Raudsepa is a village in Otepää Parish, Valga County in southeastern Estonia. It has a population of 37 (as of 7 February 2008).
