= Märdi, Valga County =

Village in Estonia

Märdi
- Village
- Location in Estonia
- Coordinates: 57°58′52″N 26°24′34″E
- Country: Estonia
- County: Valga County
- Municipality: Otepää Parish

Population (07.02.2008)
  - Total: 56

Märdi is a village in Otepää Parish, Valga County in southeastern Estonia. It has a population of 56 (as of 7 February 2008).
