= Kassiratta =

Village in Estonia

- Village
- Location in Estonia
- Coordinates: 57°58′14″N 26°27′43″E
- Country: Estonia
- County: Valga County
- Municipality: Otepää Parish

Population (07.02.2008)
  - Total: 14

Kassiratta is a village in Otepää Parish, Valga County in southeastern Estonia. It has a population of 14 (as of 7 February 2008).
