= Vana-Otepää =

Village in Estonia

- Village
- Location in Estonia
- Coordinates: 58°04′32″N 26°31′25″E
- Country: Estonia
- County: Valga County
- Municipality: Otepää Parish

Population (07.02.2008)
  - Total: 163

Vana-Otepää is a village in Otepää Parish, Valga County in southeastern Estonia. It has a population of 163 (as of 7 February 2008).
