= Otepää (village) =

Village in Estonia

- Village
- Location in Estonia
- Coordinates: 58°03′54″N 26°31′08″E
- Country: Estonia
- County: Valga County
- Municipality: Otepää Parish

Population (07.02.2008)
  - Total: 313

Otepää (German: Odenpäh) is a village in Otepää Parish, Valga County in southeastern Estonia. It has a population of 313 (as of 7 February 2008).
