= Ilmjärve =

Village in Estonia

- Village
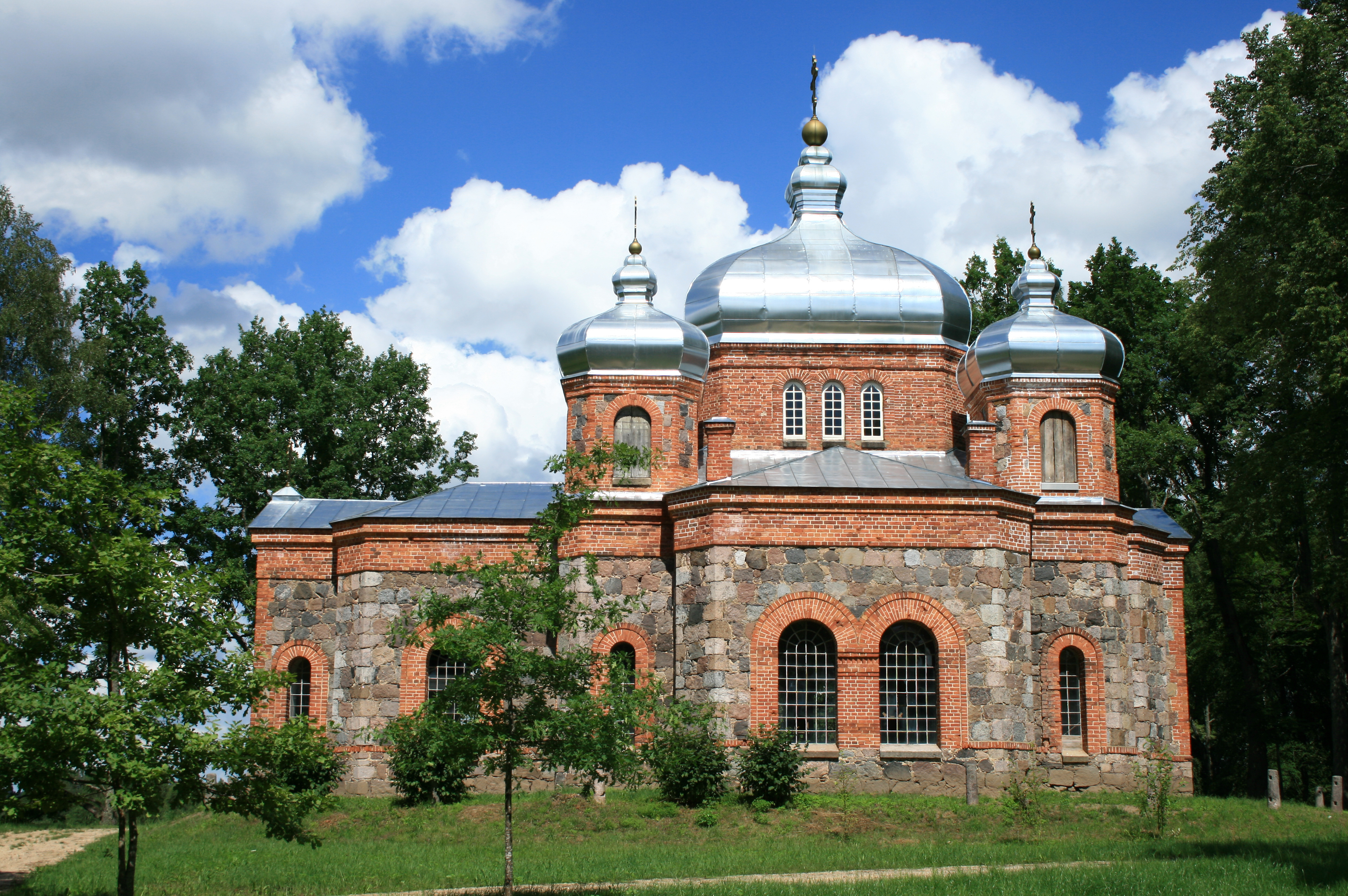
- Ilmjärve Orthodox Church

- Location in Estonia
- Coordinates: 57°57′14″N 26°26′36″E
- Country: Estonia
- County: Valga County
- Municipality: Otepää Parish

Population (07.02.2008)
  - Total: 44

Ilmjärve is a village in Otepää Parish, Valga County in southeastern Estonia. It has a population of 44 (as of 7 February 2008).
