= Mägestiku =

Village in Estonia

- Village
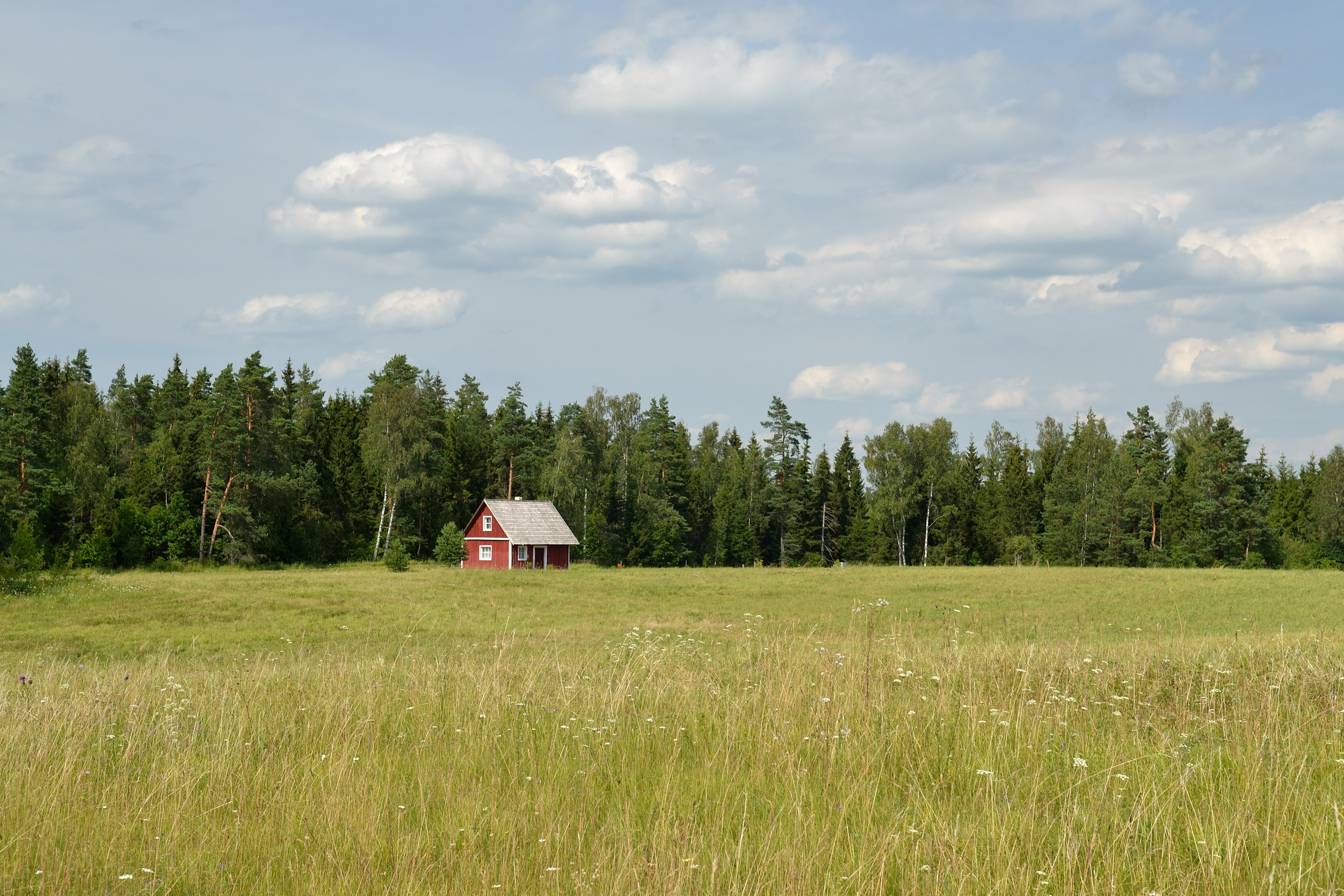

- Location in Estonia
- Coordinates: 58°04′48″N 26°24′49″E
- Country: Estonia
- County: Valga County
- Municipality: Otepää Parish

Population (07.02.2008)
  - Total: 45

Mägestiku is a village in Otepää Parish, Valga County in southeastern Estonia. It has a population of 50 (as of 7 February 2008).
