= Miti, Estonia =

Village in Estonia

Miti
- Village
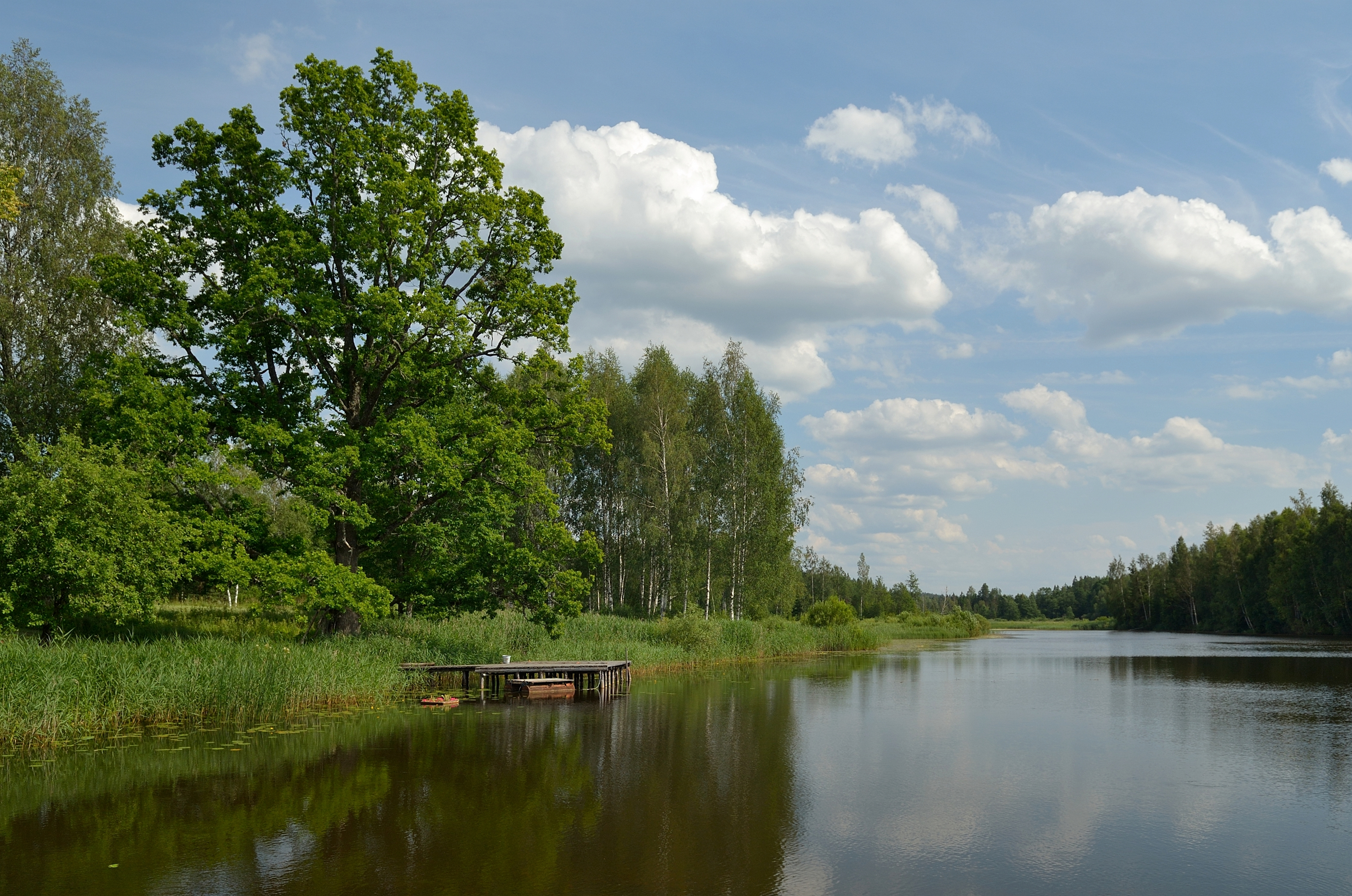

- Location in Estonia
- Coordinates: 58°05′58″N 26°21′34″E
- Country: Estonia
- County: Valga County
- Municipality: Otepää Parish

Population (01.01.2011)
  - Total: 17

Miti is a village in Otepää Parish, Valga County in southeastern Estonia. It's located about 9 km (6 mi) northwest of the town of Otepää and about 14 km (9 mi) south of the town of Elva. Miti has a population of 17 (as of 1 January 2011).
