= Neeruti, Valga County =

Village in Estonia

Neeruti
- Village
- Location in Estonia
- Coordinates: 58°07′02″N 26°33′54″E
- Country: Estonia
- County: Valga County
- Municipality: Otepää Parish

Population (01.01.2011)
  - Total: 70

Neeruti (German: Megel) is a village in Otepää Parish, Valga County in southeastern Estonia. It's located about 7 km (4 mi) northeast of the town of Otepää. Neeruti has a population of 70 (as of 1 January 2011).
