= Restu =

Village in Estonia

- Village
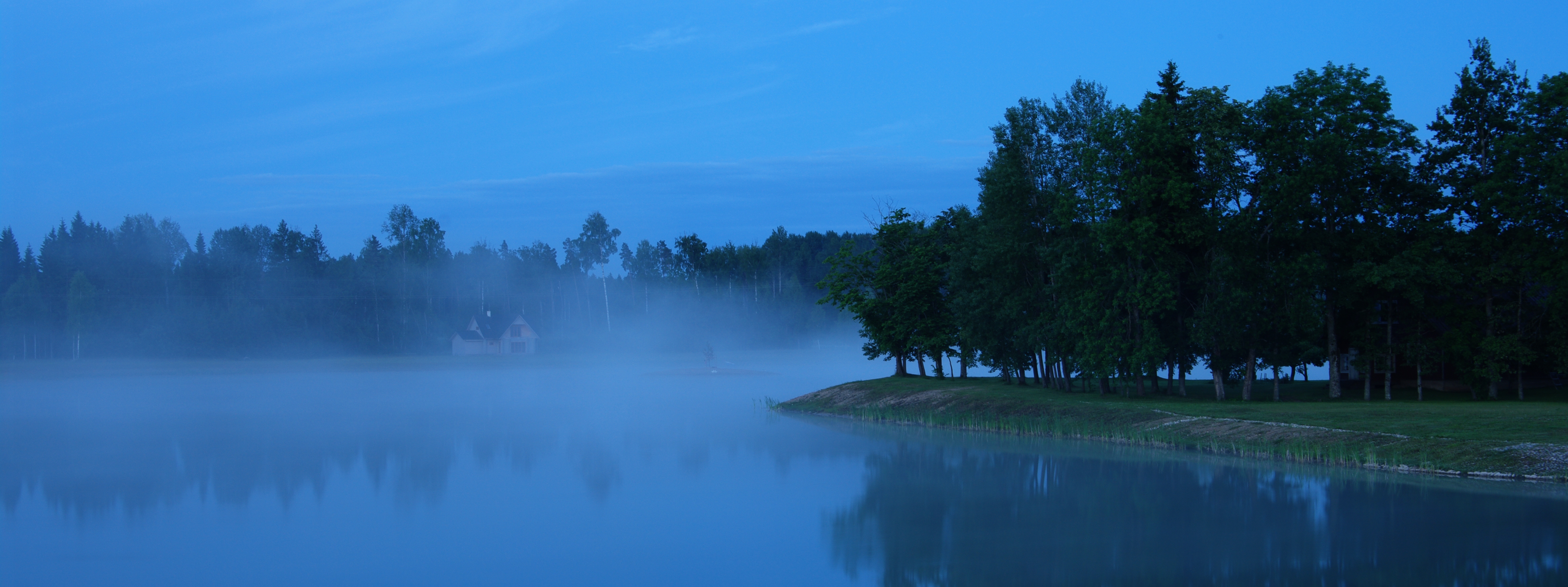
- The old sand quarry lake in Restu

- Location within Estonia
- Coordinates: 57.9458°N 26.3756°E
- Country: Estonia
- County: Valga County
- Parish: Otepää Parish
- Time zone: UTC+2 (EET)
  - Summer (DST): UTC+3 (EEST)

Restu is a village in Otepää Parish, Valga County in Estonia.
