= Sangaste =

Borough in Estonia

- Small borough
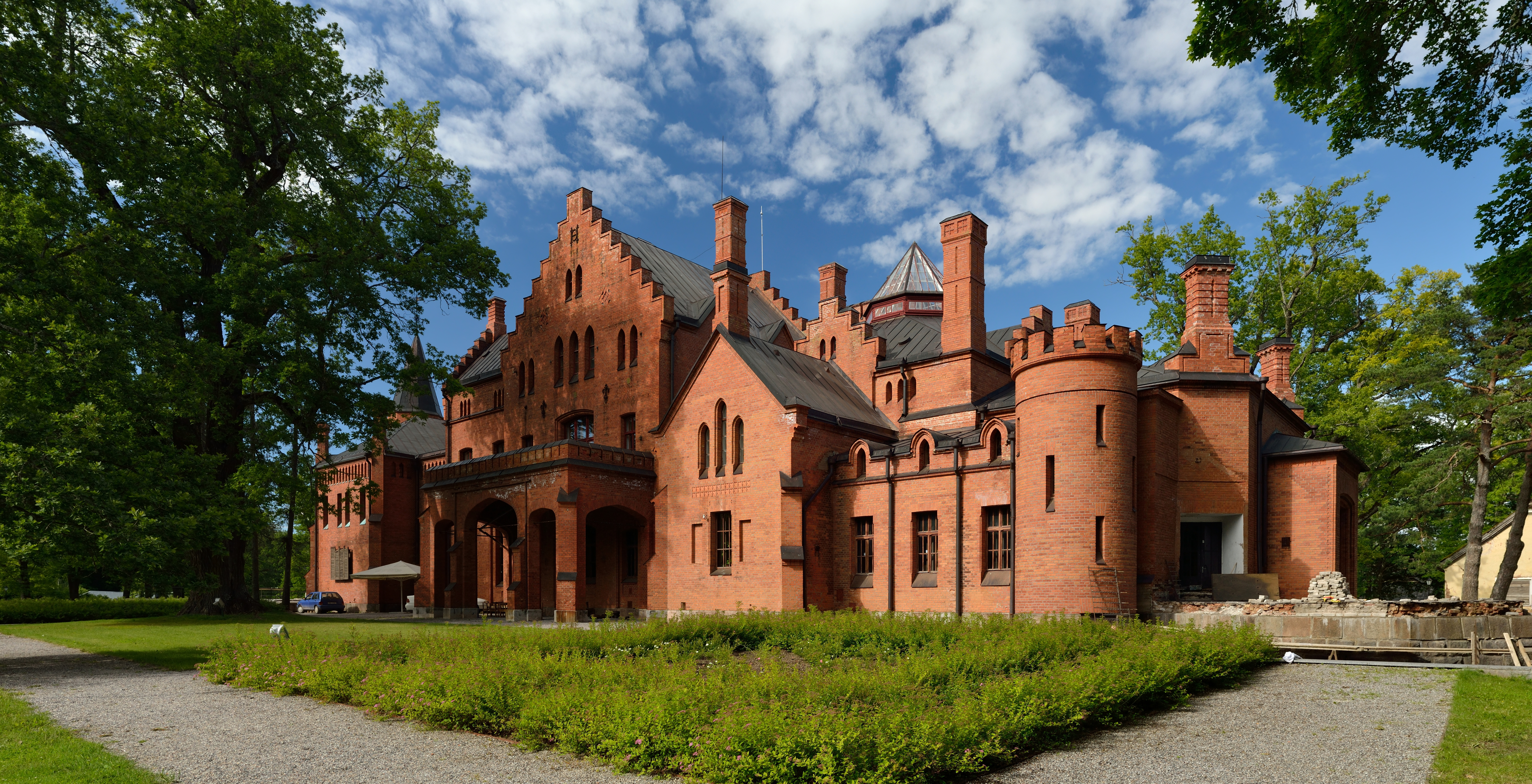
- Sangaste Castle

- Location in Estonia
- Coordinates: 57°55′34″N 26°19′55″E
- Country: Estonia
- County: Valga County
- Municipality: Otepää Parish

Population (01.01.2010)
  - Total: 228

Sangaste (Võro: Sangastõ) is a small borough (Estonian: alevik) in Otepää Parish, Valga County, southern Estonia. Sangaste has a population of 228 (as of 1 January 2010).

== Name ==
Sangaste was attested in historical sources as Sangnitz in 1522, Sangnic in 1582, Sanngnitz in 1601, and Sangenitz in 1638 (variously referring to the manor or village), among other spellings. Lauri Kettunen suggested that the name is based on the noun sang (genitive sanga) 'bend, curvature', although in southern Estonia the word vang is more typical. Because place names ending in -ste often contain personal names, it is hypothesized that the toponym may be based a personal name such as Old Prussian Sange or Sangus.

== Sangaste Castle ==
Sangaste Castle (or Sangaste Manor; German: Schloss Sagnitz) traces its history to at least 1522, when it was part of the estates of the bishop of Tartu. The current building was built from 1879 to 1883 and designed by the architect Otto Pius Hippius. It is built in a neo-Gothic style with influences from Tudor architecture, and it is considered one of the most impressive examples of Gothic Revival architecture in the Baltic States. Several original interior details have been preserved to this day. The manor house was unusually modern for its time, equipped with central heating, telephones in 1896, and electric light in 1907.

According to legend, it owes its existence to an insult the local count Friedrich Georg Magnus von Berg received in his youth. When attempting to wed a young English lady, her father objected to giving his daughter away to "some Russian savage". Nowadays the castle is administratively located in the nearby village of Lossiküla.

== Gallery ==
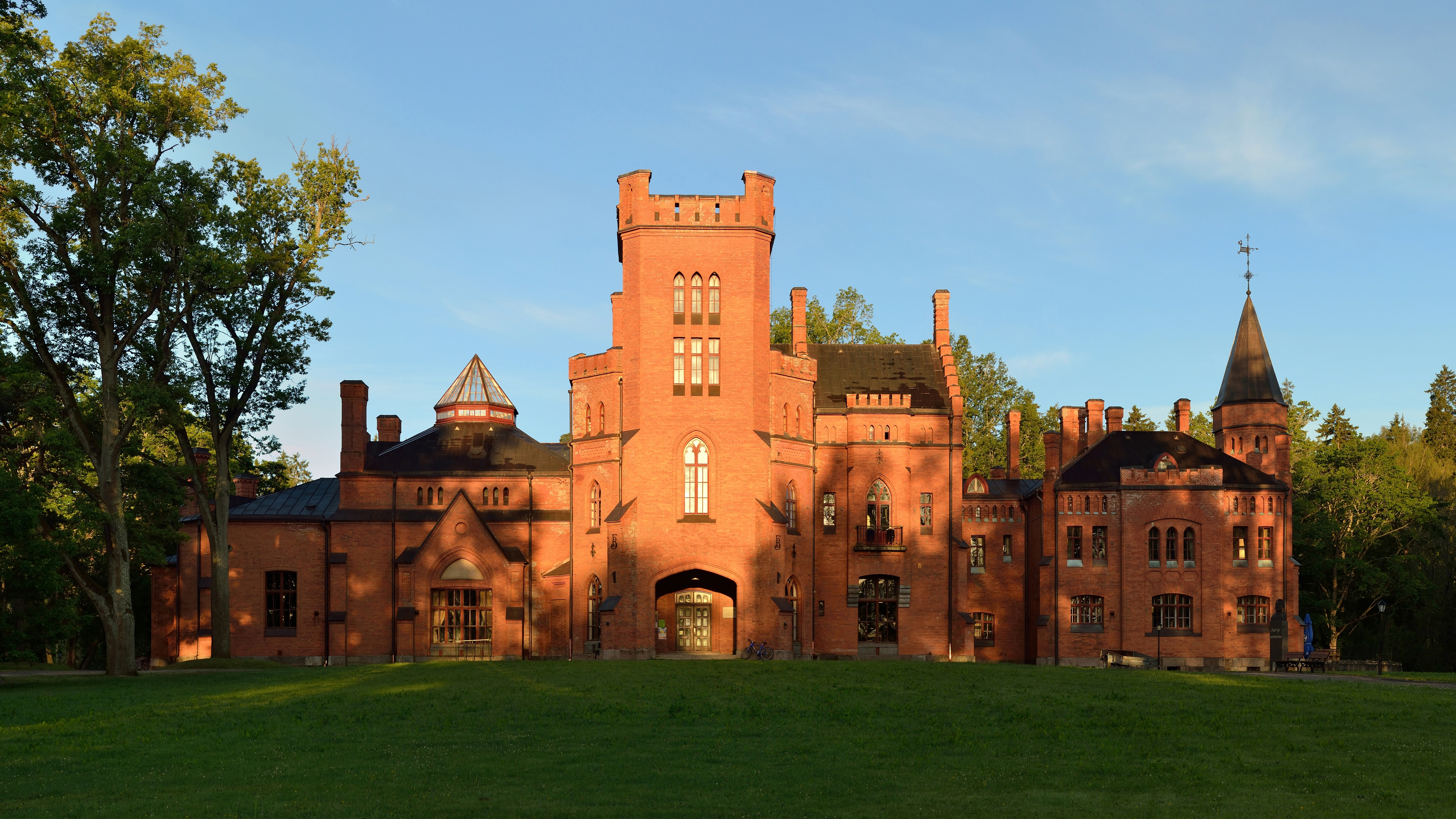
Sangaste Castle

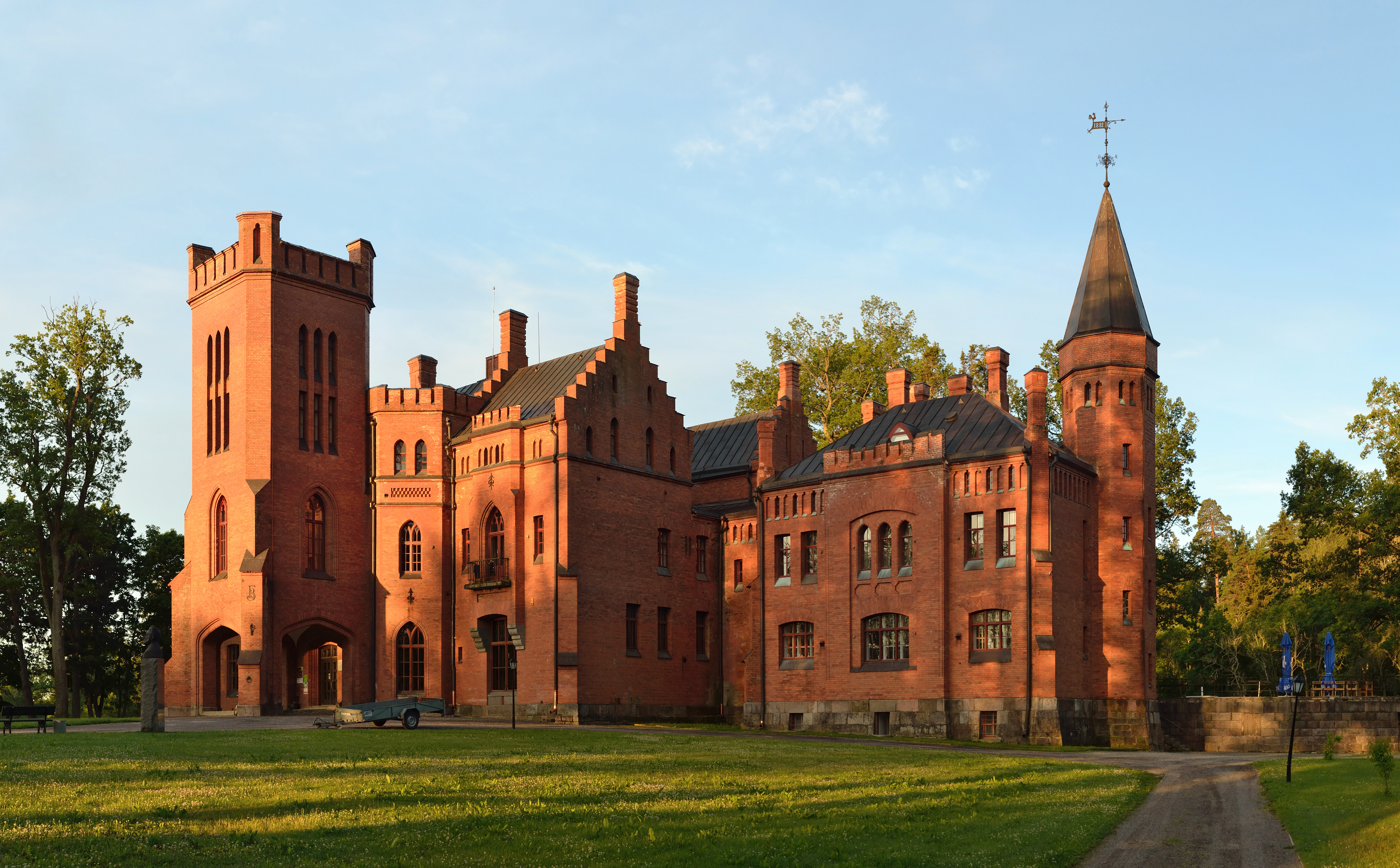
Sangaste Castle

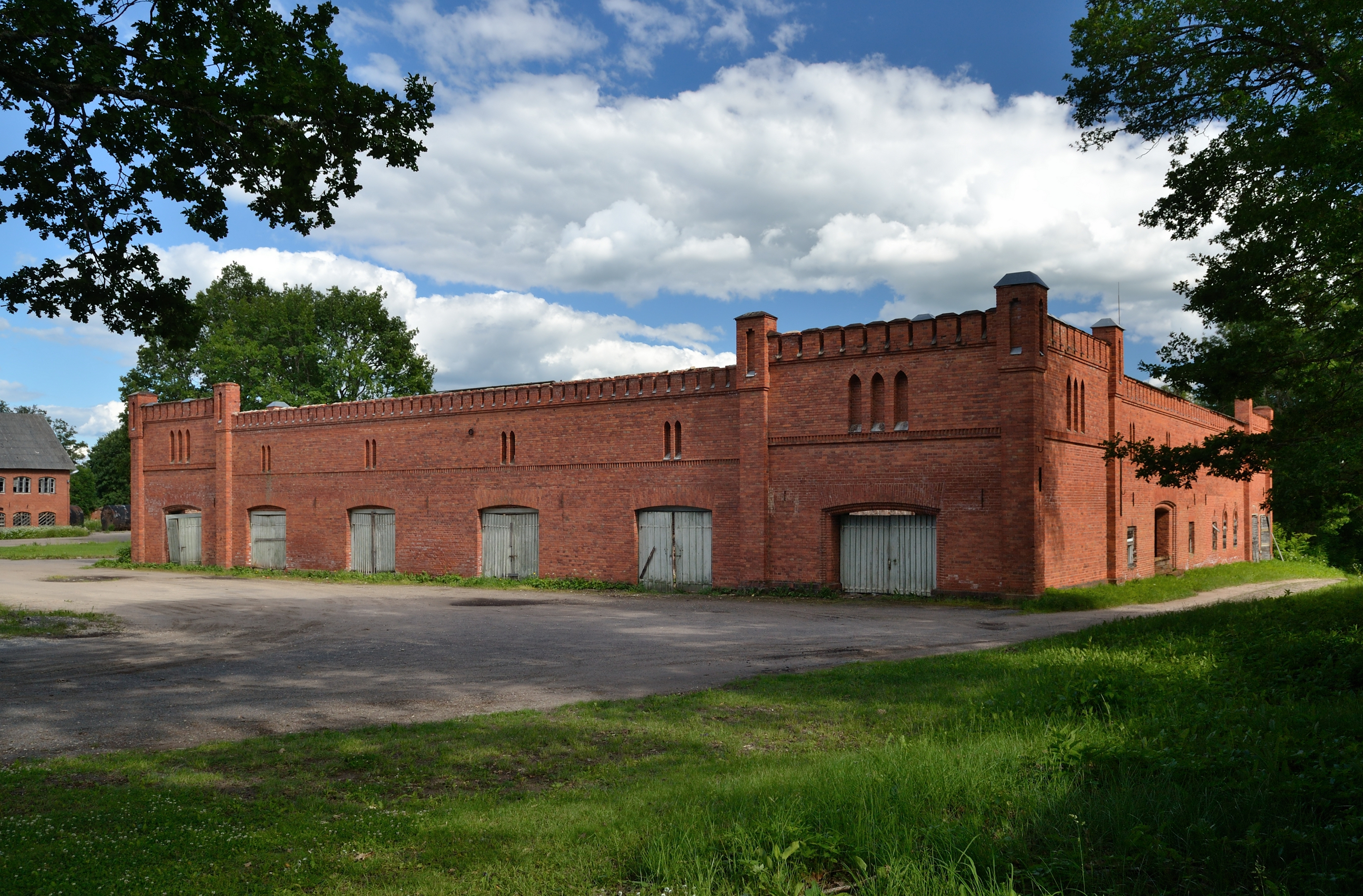
Sangaste Manor stable-coach house

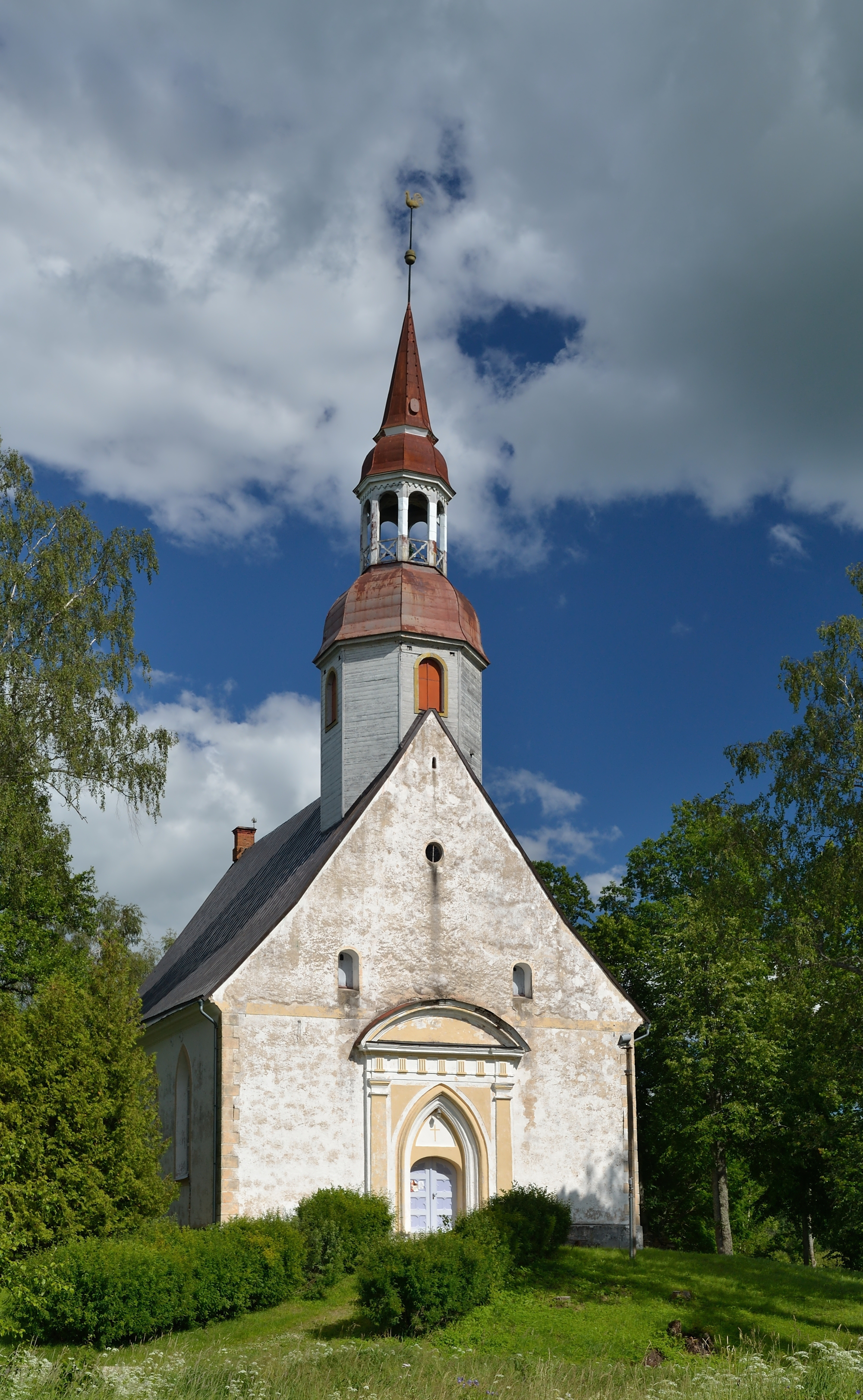
Sangaste church

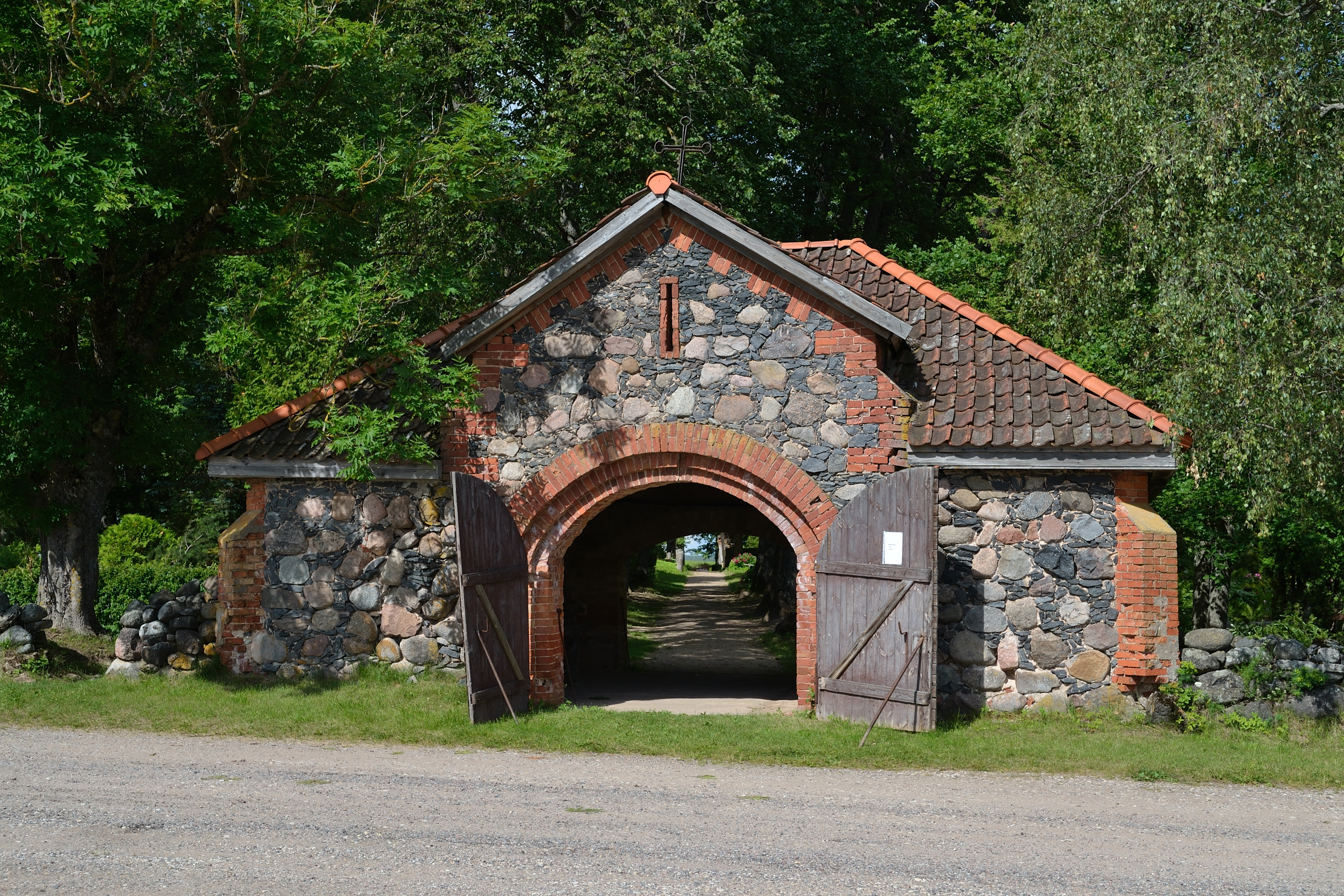
One of the cemetery chapels in Sangaste cemetery

== Notable people ==
- Friedrich Wilhelm Rembert von Berg (1793–1874), Baltic German Field Marshal, the Governor-General of Finland and notable for his role in the Russification of Poland; was born in Sangaste Castle
- August Gailit (1891–1960), writer; was born in Kuiksilla, near Sangaste Castle
- Aarne Viisimaa (1898–1989), operatic tenor and opera director
- Jaan Zimmermann (1880–1942), entrepreneur

Preceding station	Elron	Following station
Keeni towards Tallinn	Tallinn–Tartu–Valga	Valga Terminus
