= Kuigatsi =

Village in Estonia

- Village
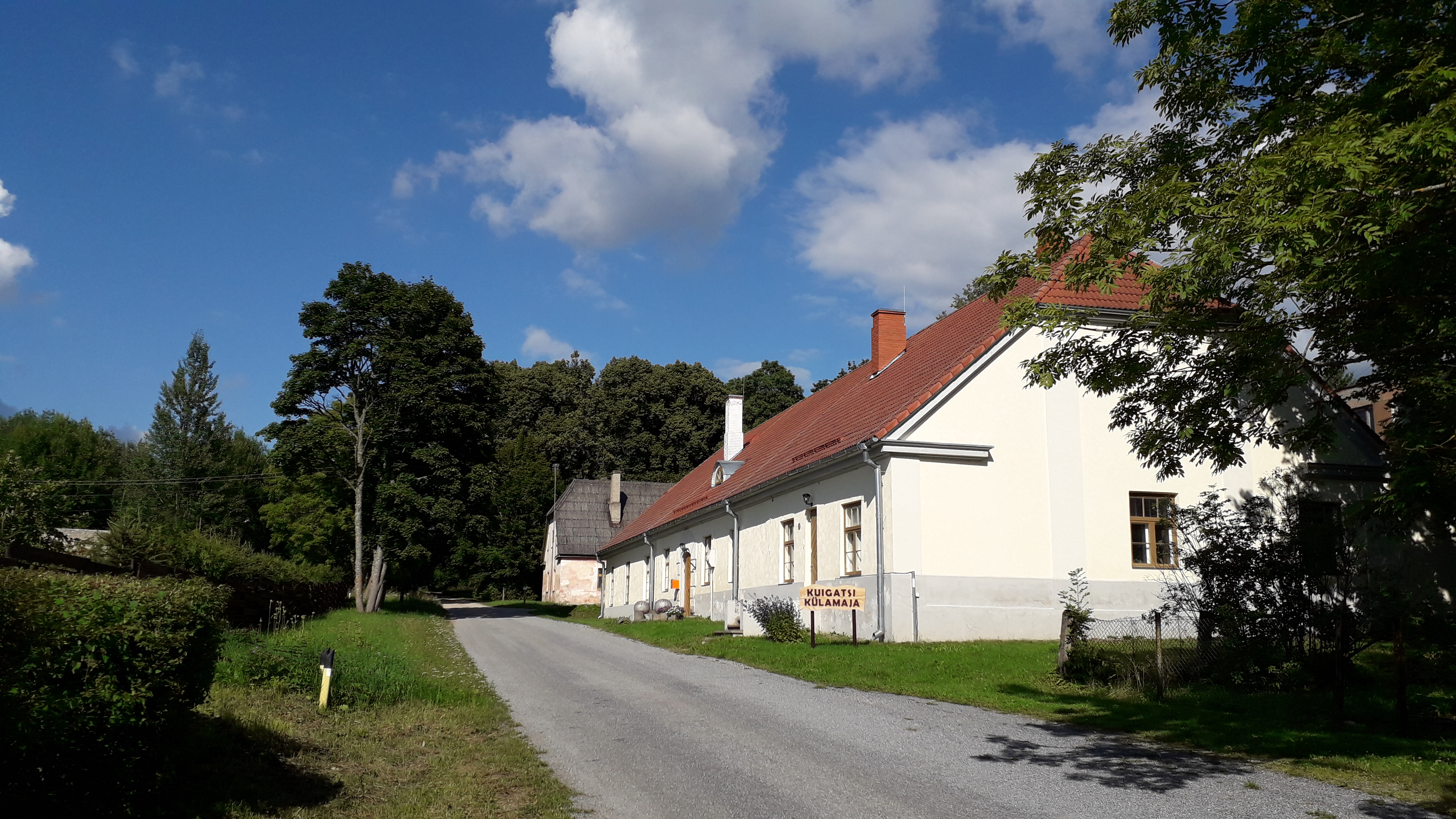

- Location within Estonia
- Coordinates: 58.009444444444°N 26.196944444444°E
- Country: Estonia
- County: Valga County
- Parish: Otepää Parish
- Time zone: UTC+2 (EET)
  - Summer (DST): UTC+3 (EEST)

Kuigatsi is a village in Otepää Parish, Valga County in Estonia.

Kuigatsi was first mentioned in 1366. The Kuigatsi manor was located there, which was first mentioned in 1509. The manor's main building and several auxiliary buildings have been preserved. On the basis of the 1765 directive, a village school was created in Kuigatsi, which was opened in 1768. In the 20th century, the school operated in the main building of the manor until 1975. After that, the Valga district school for children with special needs (Kuigatsi Special Boarding School) found a place there, and later also an orphanage. It was liquidated in 2001.

Kuigatsi has been the center of the municipality. A library has been operating in the village since 1904, which is located in the village house. In addition to the library, there are social rooms, a youth room and a hall offering community services. In the past, there was also a shop in the same place.

There is a bus stop in Kuigatsi, and the Mägiste railway station is located 2 kilometers from the village center. The Võru–Kuigatsi–Tõrva highway passes through the village. The village is characterized by scattered settlements, the names of the farms are among others Haljamäe, Laudanurme, Pedajamäe, Luiga, Laane, Villemi, Hargo and others.

Clergyman Paul Uibopuu (1910–1984) and nature conservation figure and orienteer Madis Aruja (1936–1995) were born in Kuigatsi. A white pine grows in the village, which is among the largest in Estonia.
