= Mäeküla, Valga County =

Village in Estonia

- Village
- Location within Estonia
- Coordinates: 57.978333333333°N 26.316944444444°E
- Country: Estonia
- County: Valga County
- Parish: Otepää Parish
- Time zone: UTC+2 (EET)
  - Summer (DST): UTC+3 (EEST)

Mäeküla is a village in Otepää Parish, Valga County in Estonia.
