= Keeni =

Village in Estonia

- village
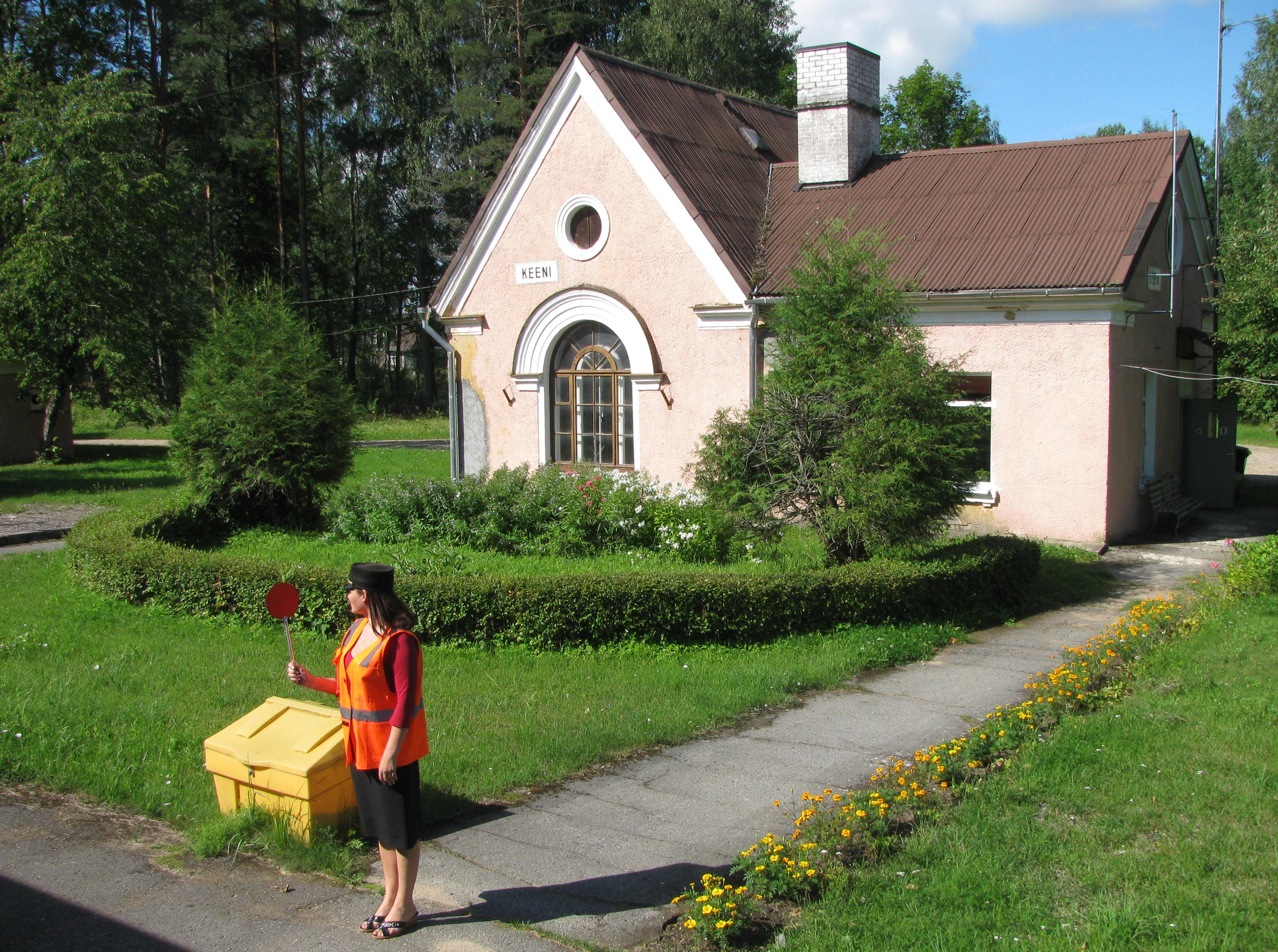
- Keeni railway station

- Location in Estonia
- Coordinates: 57°57′22″N 26°16′38″E
- Country: Estonia
- County: Valga County
- Municipality: Otepää Parish
- First mentioned: 1551

Population (01.01.2011)
  - Total: 331

Keeni is a village in Otepää Parish, Valga County, in southern Estonia. It has population of 331 (as of 1 January 2011).

Keeni Manor (Kehn, later Koenen, Konhöf) was first mentioned in 1551. From 1924 until its dispossession in 1920, the manor belonged to the Lilienfelds. A single-storey stone main building was constructed at the end of the 18th century but was changed much in the 19th century. Nowadays it's again in private possession.

Since 1840 a school is working in Keeni.

Keeni has a station on Tartu–Valga railway. Võru–Tõrva road (nr. 69) passes through Keeni.

Preceding station	Elron	Following station
Mägiste towards Tallinn	Tallinn–Tartu–Valga	Sangaste towards Valga
