= Valga County =

County of Estonia

Coordinates: 57°52′N 26°10′E

Valga County Valgamaa
- County
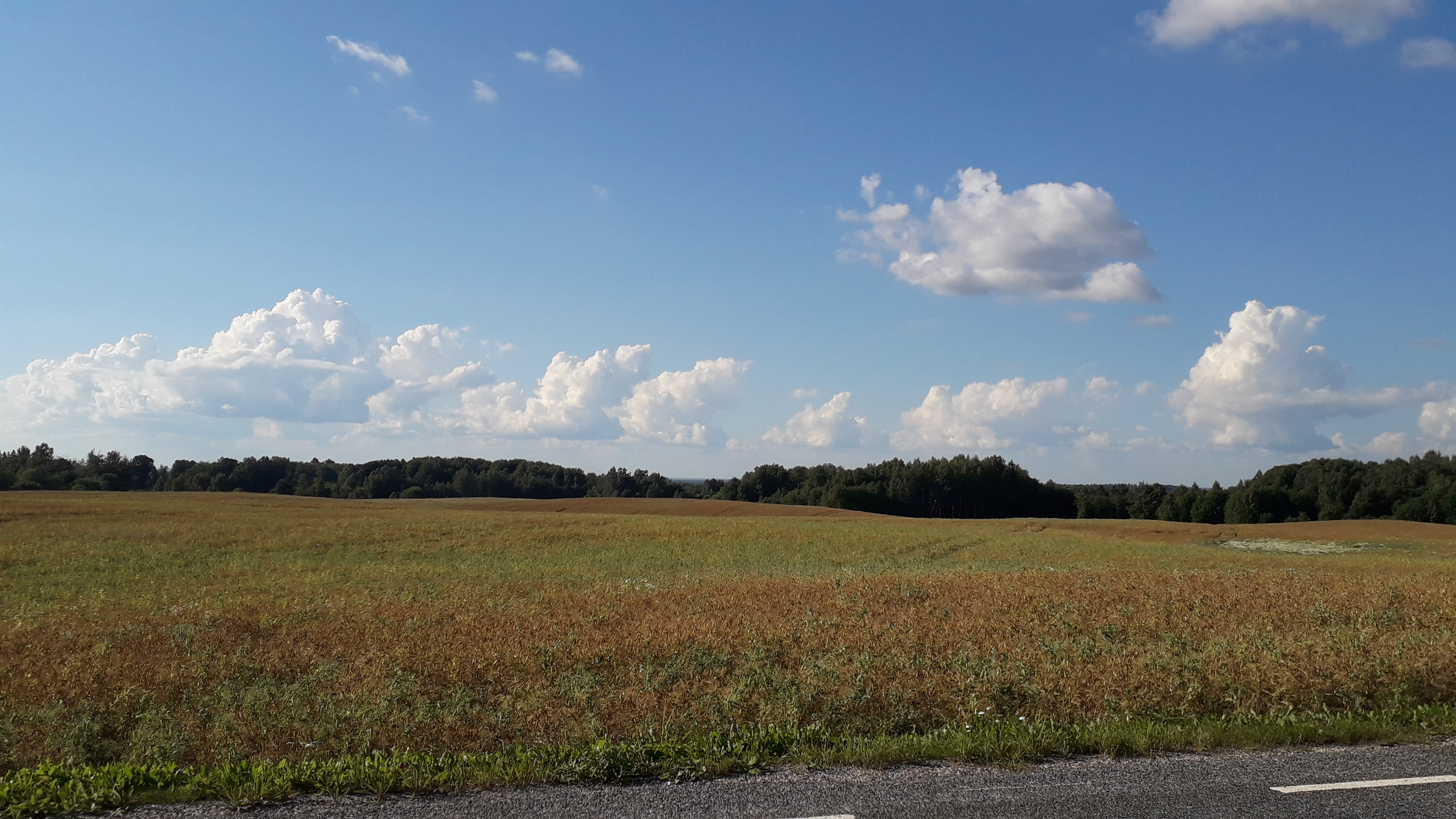

- Flag Coat of arms

- Country: Estonia
- Capital: Valga

Area
  - Total: 2,043.53 km^{2} (789.01 sq mi)

Population (2022)
  - Total: 27,650
  - Rank: 11th
  - Density: 14.7/km^{2} (38/sq mi)

GDP
  - Total: €425 million (2022)
  - Per capita: €15,260 (2022)
- ISO 3166 code: EE-81
- Vehicle registration: G

Valga County (Estonian: Valga maakond or Valgamaa) is a first-level administrative unit and one of 15 counties of Estonia. It comprises the former area of the Valga District. The present-day county was created on 1 January 1990. The capital and largest town of Valga County is Valga, followed by Tõrva and Otepää. It is located in the southern part of the country and borders Põlva and Võru counties to the east, Latvia to the south and west, and Viljandi and Tartu County to the north. 27,650 people live in Valga County as of 2022.

== General ==
Valga County is located in southern Estonia. By the economic-geographical and regional-political distribution it belongs to the area of South-East Estonia (together with Põlva and Võru counties). By historical ties and landscape, the county belongs to the region of South Estonia (together with Põlva, Võru, Viljandi, Tartu and Jõgeva counties). With a population of 30,176 people (as of 1 January 2014), the total area of the county is 2,043.53 km^{2} (2,046.49 km^{2} together with the area of Võrtsjärv), it reaches 65 km in the north–south direction and 59 km in the east–west direction. Valga County ranks 12th in Estonia by population and 14th by area.

The distances from the county centre, Valga, are the following: Tallinn 267 km, Tartu 86 km, Viljandi 88 km, Võru 73 km, Põlva 96 km, Pärnu 141 km, Narva 264 km and Riga 157 km.

Valga County borders with Viljandi County in the north-west, with Tartu County in the north and Põlva and Võru County in the east. Valga County has a borderline with the Republic of Latvia in the south and west (102.4 km).

== History ==
=== Medieval Period ===
It can be read from the Livonian Chronicle of Henry that the history of the county goes back to the 13th century when the Germans conquered the settlement. By the Chronicle the Ümera River was the borderline between Estonia and Latvia. Historians suggest that the Säde River was the borderline, flowing through the northern part of Tireli Bog and falling into Lake Burtnieks. Meadows and forests surrounding the big Tireli Bog and the upper stream of the River Säde were probably even wider and impassable at that time and therefore functioning perfectly as a border.

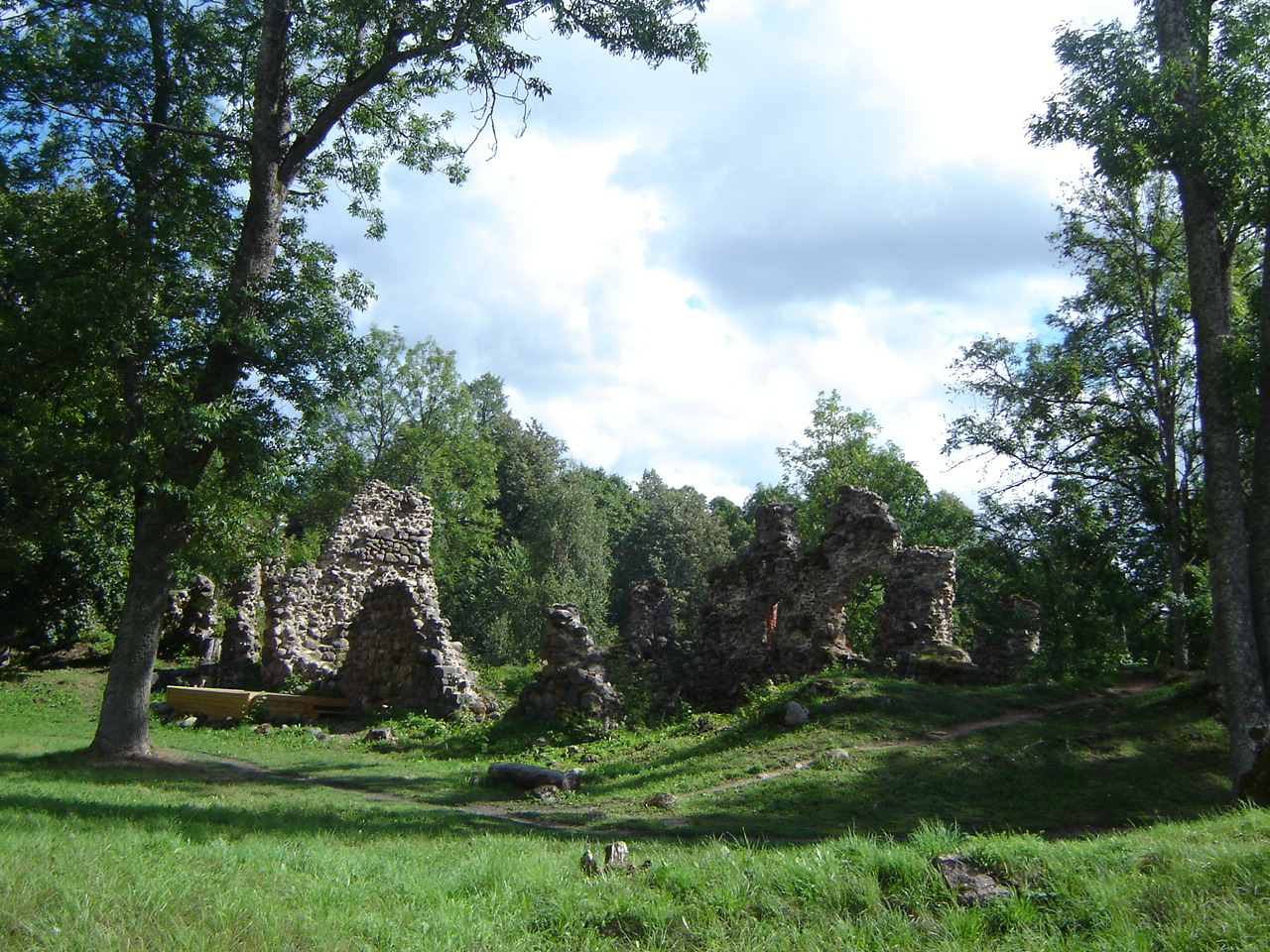
Ruins of Helme Order Castle, built in the 14th century

The ancient (13th century) national border ran in a totally different place. Assumably the area of Härgmäe belonged to Estonian settlements and the national border went from the springs of the River Säde, passed the forests until the northernmost oxbow of the Koiva River and onwards alongside the river. Most likely the area of Kaagjärve and Valga Town belonged to ancient Latgalians.

After the crusades and the Ancient Freedom Fight in the 13th century, Valga County became a natural centre of the historical Old Livonia where the most important roads from north, south and east went through, gaining strategical importance.

=== Early Modern Period ===
City rights were given to Valga by a Polish King Stefan Batory in 1584.

On the 3rd of July, 1783, the Empress Catherine II established a new administration order in the Baltic provinces. A new kreis (county), Valga Kreis, was constituted mainly from the territories of Riga and Võnnu Kreises. Valga Town which formerly belonged to Riga Kreis, went over to Valga Kreis. Valga Kreis consisted of eleven parishes, nine of them located on the present Latvian territory, and just two – Luke (Lugaži in Latvian, Luhde in German) and Härgmäe (Ērģeme in Latvian, Ermes in German) – had an edge on the present Estonian area, mostly near Valga, which became an attraction centre of the new kreis.

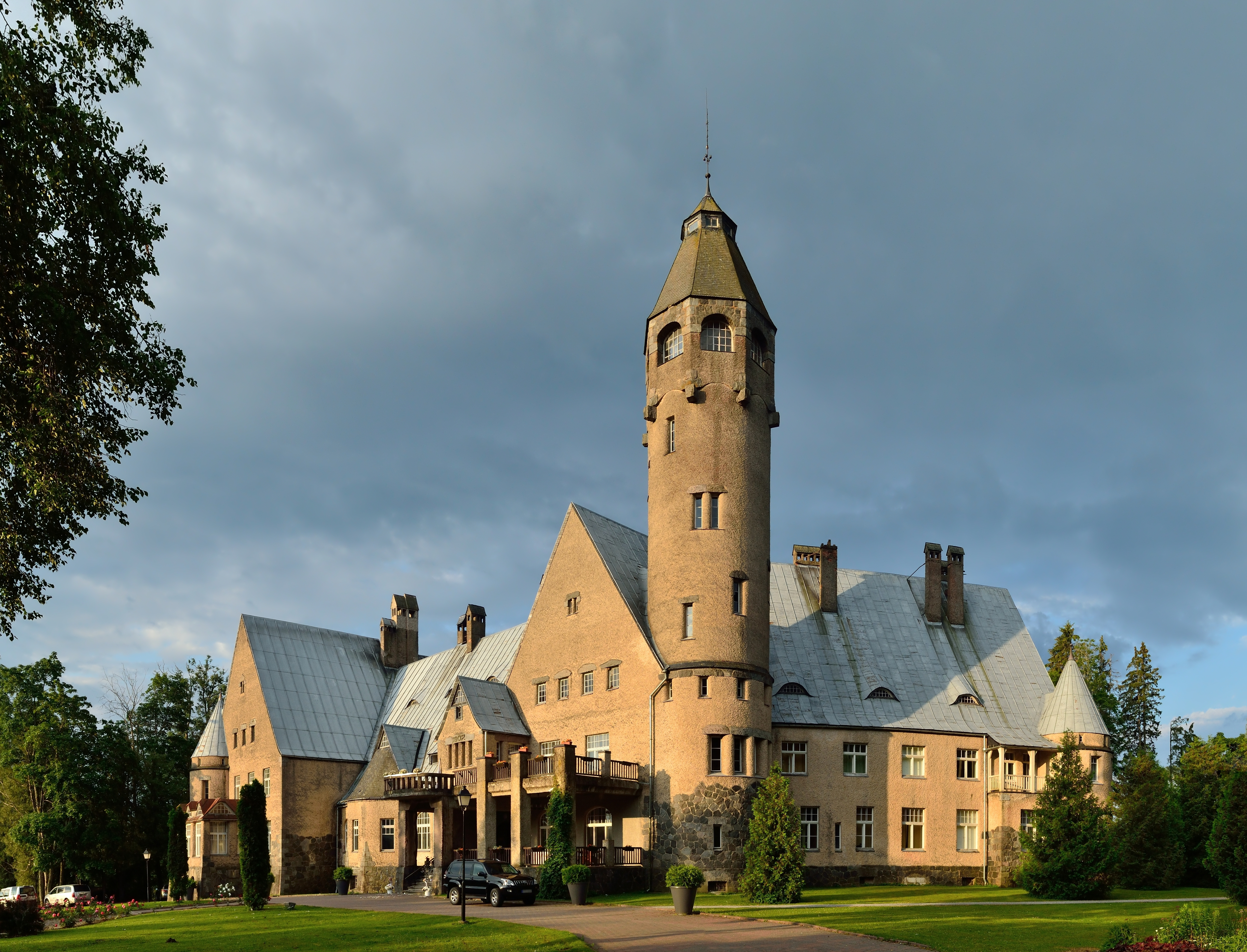
The main building of Taagepera Manor (built in 1907–1912)

=== Recent history ===
On 12 February 1919, the Government of the Republic of Estonia issued a regulation of constitution of Valga County, consisting of the territories gained during the Estonian War of Independence. Several parts of Võru, Tartu and Viljandi Counties were close to Valga from the other side. On 19 April the first county governor was elected – Johann Kurvits, a farmer of Karula. He held this position until July 1921, when August Sild followed his position.

Until the 1920s the surroundings of Härgmäe and Valga belonged to the mixed area of Estonia-Latvia as there was no exact national border. Half of the citizens were Latvians, the other half were Estonians. In 1920 the national border was fixed and that helped to differentiate between the nations. Valga Kreis was divided so that Estonia got the areas of Paju and Sooru Manors and the majority of Valga (where the citizens were mostly Estonians), the rest belonged to Latvia.

==== Independence ====
Valga County, almost in its present shape, was formed on 6 September 1920 when the course of the War of Independence and the situation at that time required Valga's separation from the other counties.

On 11 February 1921 the Estonian Government fixed the area of Valga County. Võru County gave Kaagjärve, Karula, Laanemetsa and Taheva parishes, Tartu County gave Tõlliste, Laatre, Sangaste, Keeni and Kuigatsi parishes, Viljandi County gave Jõgeveste, Patküla, Koorküla, Taagepera, Leebiku, Helme, Lõve and Hummuli parishes. Later on, several administrative territorial changes were carried through. In 1921 Patküla parish was separated from Holdre parish and Tõrva borough. Puraküla, which formerly belonged to Paju parish was united to the town of Valga in 1922. In 1924 Paju parish was united to Sooru parish and on 2 July 1926, it started to bear the name Tõrva. Since the second half of the 1920s until 1939 there were 19 parishes in Valga County.

In 1939 many smaller parishes were united by the administrative reform. Ten parishes were left: Helme, Hummuli, Kaagjärve, Karula, Kuigatsi, Põdrala, Sangaste, Taheva, Tõlliste and Vaoküla.

==== World War II and occupation ====
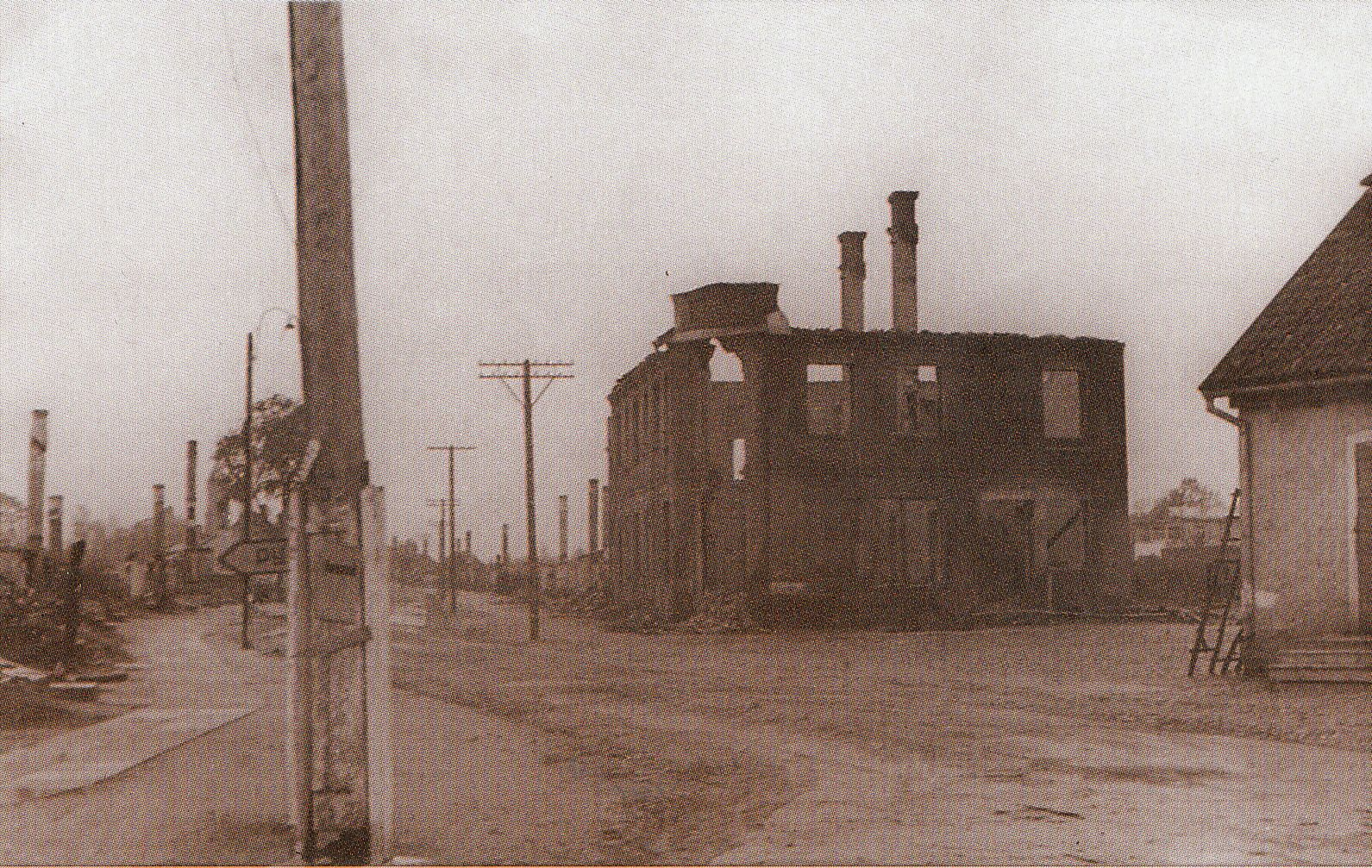
Aftermath of World War II. City centre of Tõrva on the year 1944.

The last pre-occupation County Governor Värdi Vellner had to give up his power on 8 July 1940. Nevertheless, the administrative division of 1939 lasted until 1950 when 39 county districts were formed. They were divided into 636 village soviets.

The present territory of Valga County was divided into three parts: Valga, Tõrva and Otepää districts. In 1952 the oblasts of Tallinn, Tartu and Pärnu were formed on the territory of the Estonian SSR.

In 1959 the liquidation of smaller districts began. Antsla, Otepää and Tõrva districts were liquidated. Tõrva and the village soviets of Haabsaare, Helme, Koorküla, Mõniste, Riidaja and Taagepera were united to Valga district. Otepää town and the village soviets of Otepää and Pühajärve were united to Elva district. In 1961 Mõniste was united to Võru district.

The next year, in 1962, Otepää and the village soviets of Aakre, Otepää and Palupera were reunited with the Valga District. One year later, some areas of the Põlva District were united with the Valga District. In 1966, the area of Valtina was added and thus the final border of the Valga District was fixed.

In December 1989, the chairman of the former Executive Committee of the Valga District, Uno Heinla, was elected as the inaugural county governor following Estonia's reestablished independence. On 22 February 1990, the RSN Executive Committee of the Valga District was reorganized and it became the Valga County Government.

==== Regaining independence ====
After Estonia regained its independence, there were three towns (Valga, Tõrva and Otepää) and 11 parishes formed in Valga County: Helme, Hummuli, Karula, Õru, Palupera, Põdrala, Pühajärve, Puka, Sangaste, Taheva and Tõlliste. On 1 January 1999, the town of Otepää and Pühajärve Parish were merged and a new Otepää Parish was formed. Despite that, the town of Otepää kept holding the town rights, but is officially part of the rural municipality (parish).

==== County government ====
Until 2017 the County Government (Estonian: maavalitsus) was led by Governor (Estonian: maavanem), who was appointed by the Government of Estonia for a term of five years. Since 2010 the Governor position was held by Margus Lepik.

== Municipalities, settlement and population ==
There are 3 local municipalities in Valga County including Valga (county capital), Tõrva, Helme, Hummuli, Karula, Otepää, Palupera, Puka, Põdrala, Sangaste, Taheva, Tõlliste and Õru Parishes.

=== Settlement units ===
There are 3 towns, 7 boroughs and 150 villages in Valga County.

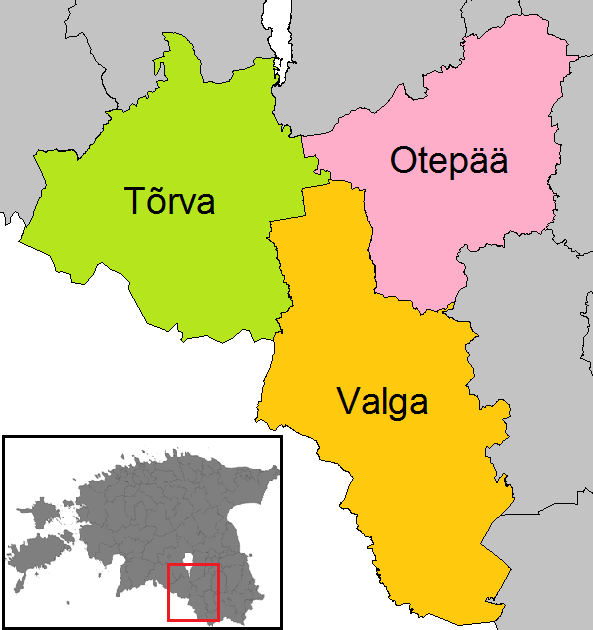
Municipalities of Valga County

#	Municipality	Type	Population (2015)	Area km^{2}	Density
1	Otepää Parish	Rural	6,637	523	12.7
2	Tõrva Parish	Rural	6,270	649	9.7
3	Valga Parish	Rural	16,664	750	22.2

=== Villages ===
Aakre - Aitsra - Ala - Alamõisa - Arula - Astuvere - Atra - Hargla - Hellenurme - Holdre - Iigaste - Ilmjärve - Jaanikese - Jeti - Jõgeveste - Kaagjärve - Kalliküla - Kalme - Karjatnurme - Karu - Karula - Kassiratta - Kastolatsi - Kaubi - Kaurutootsi - Keeni - Kibena - Killinge - Kirbu - Kirikuküla - Kiviküla - Koigu - Koikküla - Koiva - Kolli - Komsi - Koobassaare - Koorküla - Korijärve - Korkuna - Kuigatsi - Kulli - Kungi - Kurevere - Käärikmäe - Kääriku - Kähri - Kähu - Laanemetsa - Lauküla - Leebiku - Lepa - Linna - Liva - Londi - Lossiküla - Lota - Lusti - Lutike - Lutsu - Lõve - Lüllemäe - Makita - Meegaste - Miti - Muhkva - Mustumetsa - Mäeküla - Mäelooga - Mägestiku - Mägiste - Mäha - Märdi - Möldre - Neeruti - Nõuni - Nüpli - Otepää - Paju - Palamuste - Palupera - Pastaku - Patküla - Pedajamäe - Pedaste - Piiri - Pikasilla - Pikkjärve - Pilkuse - Pilpa - Plika - Pori - Prange - Priipalu - Pringi - Pugritsa - Puide - Purtsi - Põru - Päidla - Pühajärve - Pühaste - Raavitsa - Rampe - Ransi - Raudsepa - Rebasemõisa - Rebaste - Restu - Reti - Riidaja - Ringiste - Risttee - Roobe - Rulli - Ruuna - Räbi - Sarapuu - Sihva - Sooblase - Soontaga - Sooru - Supa - Taagepera - Tagula - Taheva - Tiidu - Tinu - Truuta - Tsirgumäe - Tõlliste - Tõrvase - Tõutsi - Uniküla - Uralaane - Urmi - Vaalu - Vaardi - Valtina - Vanamõisa - Vana-Otepää - Vidrike - Vilaski - Voorbahi - Väheru - Väljaküla - Õlatu - Õruste - Ädu

=== Demographical indicators ===
As of 1 January 2014, the population of Valga County was 30,176 – 47.5% of men and 52.5% of women. 14.93% were minors (age 0-14), 62.65% were at working age (age 15–64) and 22.41% were at retirement age (65 and older). 82.63% of the population were Estonians and 12.51% were Russians. The population density was 14.8 ppl/km^{2}. Since 2004 the population of the county has decreased by 4154 people. The main reason besides the natural negative population growth is the mechanical growth – the people who have left the county.

== Religion ==
The largest number of congregations in the county are of the Estonian Evangelical Lutheran Church.

Orthodox congregations in the county are predominantly under the jurisdiction of the Estonian Apostolic Orthodox Church.

Several congregations of Baptists, a catholic congregation in Valga and other Christian churches operate in the county.

Religious affiliations in Valga County, census 2000–2021*
Religion	2000		2011		2021	
Religion	Number	%	Number	%	Number	%
Christianity	8,071	28.3	6,431	25.5	5,220	22.0
—Orthodox Christians	2,259	7.9	2,360	9.3	2,140	9.0
—Lutherans	5,191	18.2	3,441	13.6	2,330	9.8
—Catholics	142	0.5	84	0.3	220	0.9
—Baptists	194	0.7	176	0.7	310	1.3
—Jehovah's Witnesses	143	0.5	112	0.4	90	0.3
—Pentecostals	81	0.3	67	0.2	80	0.3
—Old Believers	6	0.02	20	0.08	-	
—Methodists	2	0.007	1	0.003	-	
—Adventists	53	0.2	34	0.1	-	
—Other Christians	-	-	76	0.3	50	0.3
Islam	12	0.04	9	0.03	-	
Buddhism	-	-	13	0.05	-	
Other religions**	103	0.4	183	0.7	300	1.3
No religion	11,500	40.3	15,576	61.7	15,740	66.4
Not stated***	8,850	31.0	3,375	13.4	2,410	10.2
Total population*	28,536		25,226		23,720	
*The censuses of Estonia count the religious affiliations of the population older than 15 years of age.

== Geography ==
=== Relief ===
The landscape of Valga County is various. The western part is located in the south-eastern part of Sakala Upland where the moraine plain is being varied by old valleys, some hills and ridges. In the northern part the landscape is characterized by small drumlins, the low and wet areas are covered with meadows and forests. The surrounding area of Tõrva-Helme is flatter but separated by the River Õhne and the valleys of its tributaries (Valley of Tikste). In many places the sandstone of the substrate can be seen on the hillsides. The territory is quite densely populated. The farmlands are varied by meadows, lakes and a few patches of forest. In the southern part, around Hummuli and Taagepera, some rolling hills can be found.

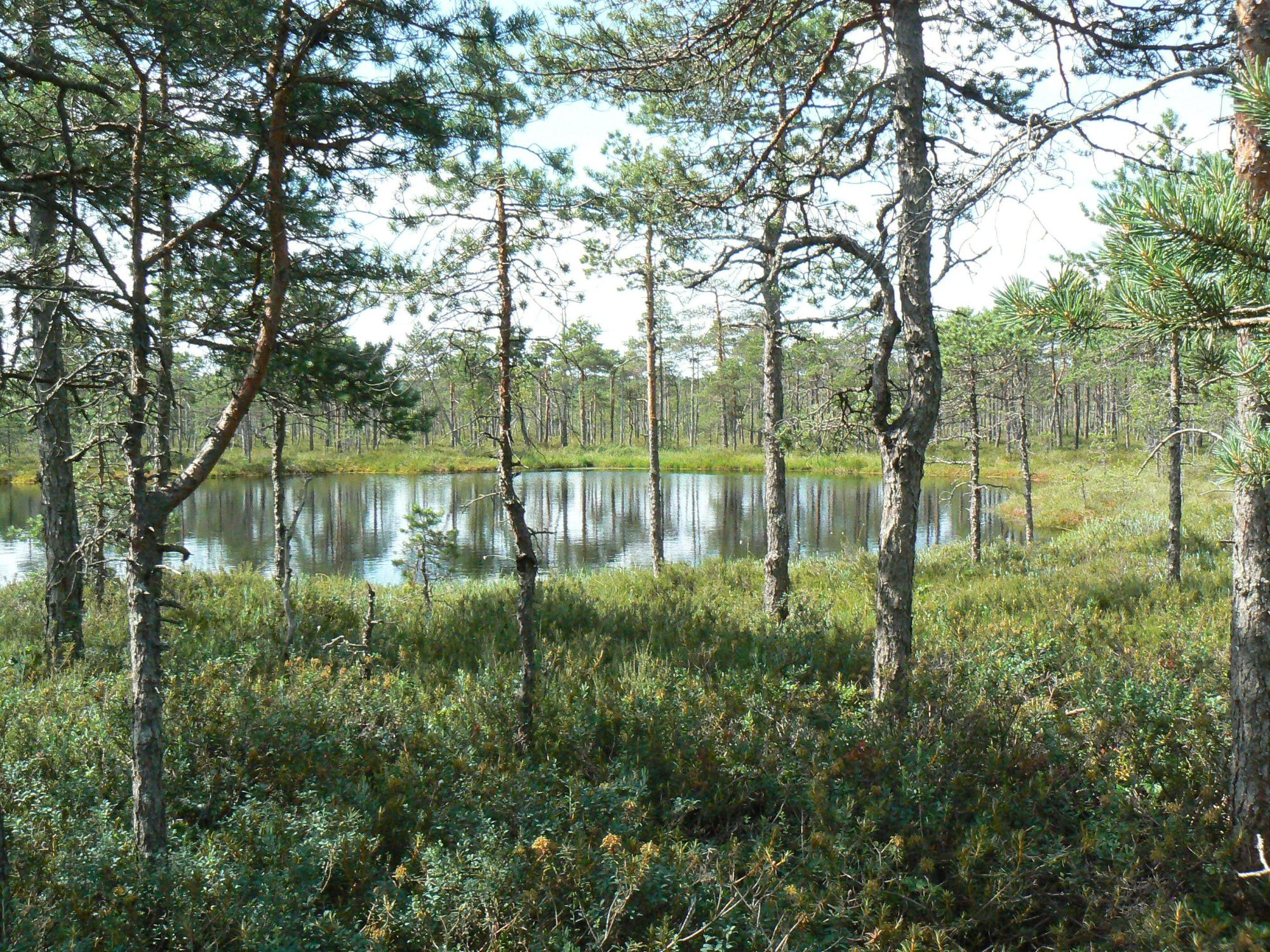
Bog pool in Rubina Bog

In the southern part of the county, there is a large sandy area with big forests, moorlands and bogs. In the middle part of the county the valley of the River Väike-Emajõgi runs from north to south. It is continued by Valga Basin with mainly flexuous moraine landscape, cut through by low valleys or basin valleys. The most noticeable is the valley of the River Väike-Emajõgi where Pedeli Valley flows into. In the middle part of Valga Basin there is a large boggy meadow of Korva. Larger farmlands are mainly located around Sangaste and Laatre.

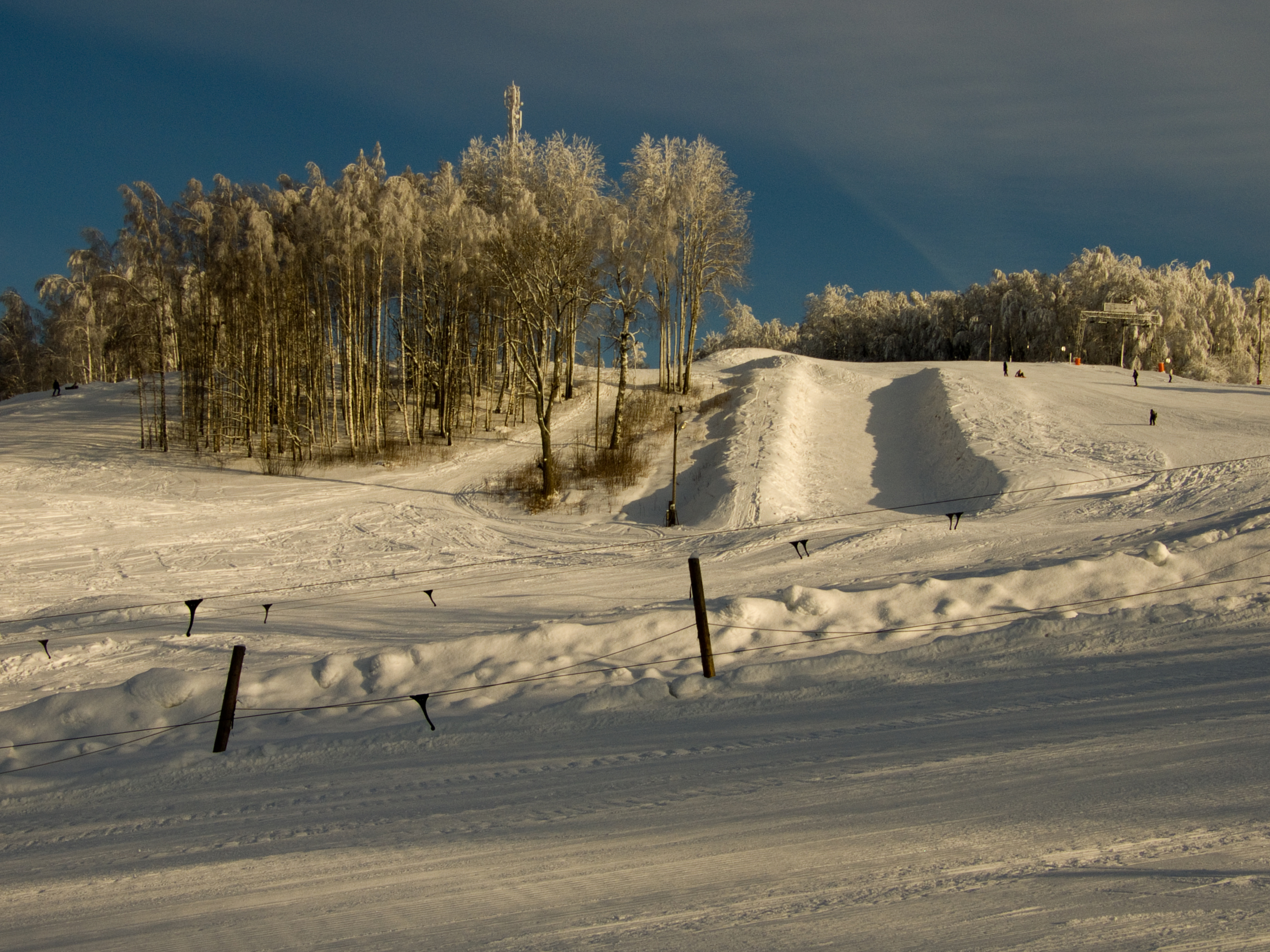
The highest peak of Valga county - Kuutsemäe (217 m)

The most various and highest part of the county is located around Otepää. The highest peaks are Kuutsemägi Hill (217 m), Meegaste Hill (214 m) and Harimägi Hill (212 m). The moraine landscape is varied by low rolling hills and many lakes, the biggest and the best-known lake is Pühajärv. On the edge areas of the upland the difference between the edges is small but the relief is strongly differentiated. To the south-east of Valga Basin, Karula Hills can be seen heading from the west to the east. The eastern part of the hills has especially varied relief. Heading to the west, the relief becomes lower and changes into lower hills continuing in the Latvia. There are many lakes in Karula. The best-known lake is Karula Pikkjärv and it is located on the northern edge of Karula Hills.

Hargla Basin is located in the southern part of the county. It is a mildly flat area between the uplands with some lonely moraine hills. The Valleys of Koiva River and Mustjõe River together with the Aheru Lake form a very picturesque area.

The area of forest land of the county is almost 114,000 hectares, which forms 56.7% of the area of Valga County. Pine and spruce are the main species. Forests are differentiated by meadows, moorlands, everglades and bogs. 7,900 hectares of the total area are covered with bogs, of which 5,400 hectares are moorlands. The largest bogs are Rubina and Korva Bog.

=== Lakes and rivers ===
Valga County has many lakes. Most of them are located in Otepää Upland, on the area of Karula Hills and on the catchment area of Õhne River. There are more than 180 natural lakes with the area of more than one hectare and with the total area of 17 km^{2}. The biggest lake is Pühjärv (286 ha),

Largest lakes of Valga county (ha)
Võrtsjärv	300*
Pühajärv	285.9
Aheru	234
Nõuni	78.8
Tündre	72.9
Valgjärv (Koorküla)	44.1
Suur-Apja	42.6
Korijärv	36.4
Pikkjärv (Karula)	34.9
Nüpli	27.5
Inni	24.5
Kaarna	23.6
Mõrtsuka	19.7
Juusa	19.3
Kääriku	19.3
*part of the lake within county borders

followed by Lake Aheru (234 ha). The southern part of Lake Võrtsjärv, with the area of 300 hectares, is also included within the borders of Valga County. Most of the lakes are quite shallow and not deeper than 10 m. The deepest lakes in the county are Udsu (30.2 m) and Petajärv (25 m), both located on the territory of Koorküla Lakes where the old valleys have been filled by the sediments from the Ice age. There are four official swimming places – the beach of Riiska Lake and Vanamõisa Lake in Tõrva, the beach of Lake Pühajärv in Otepää and the beach on the sides of Pedeli River in Valga.

The fish fauna of the lakes is quite changeable as many fish die during cold winters because of shallow water. Species such as whitefish, bream, pike, and perch die because of a lack of oxygen. There may be more than ten species of fish in some lakes.

There are more than 30 artificial lakes with the area of one hectare and with the total area of 100 ha, 20 of which being used publicly. The biggest artificial lake is Puide Reservoir on Jõku River (11.5 ha).

The best-known river of the area is Väike-Emajõgi, starting from Lake Pühajärv and falling into Lake Võrtsjärv, flowing fully on the territory of Valga County. Another important river is Pedeli, which flows through Valga and is the biggest tributary of the River Emajõgi. The River Õhne is flowing through Tõrva and the Jõku River is the tributary of the Õhne River. The River Mustjõgi flows through the south-eastern corner of the county towards Võru County.

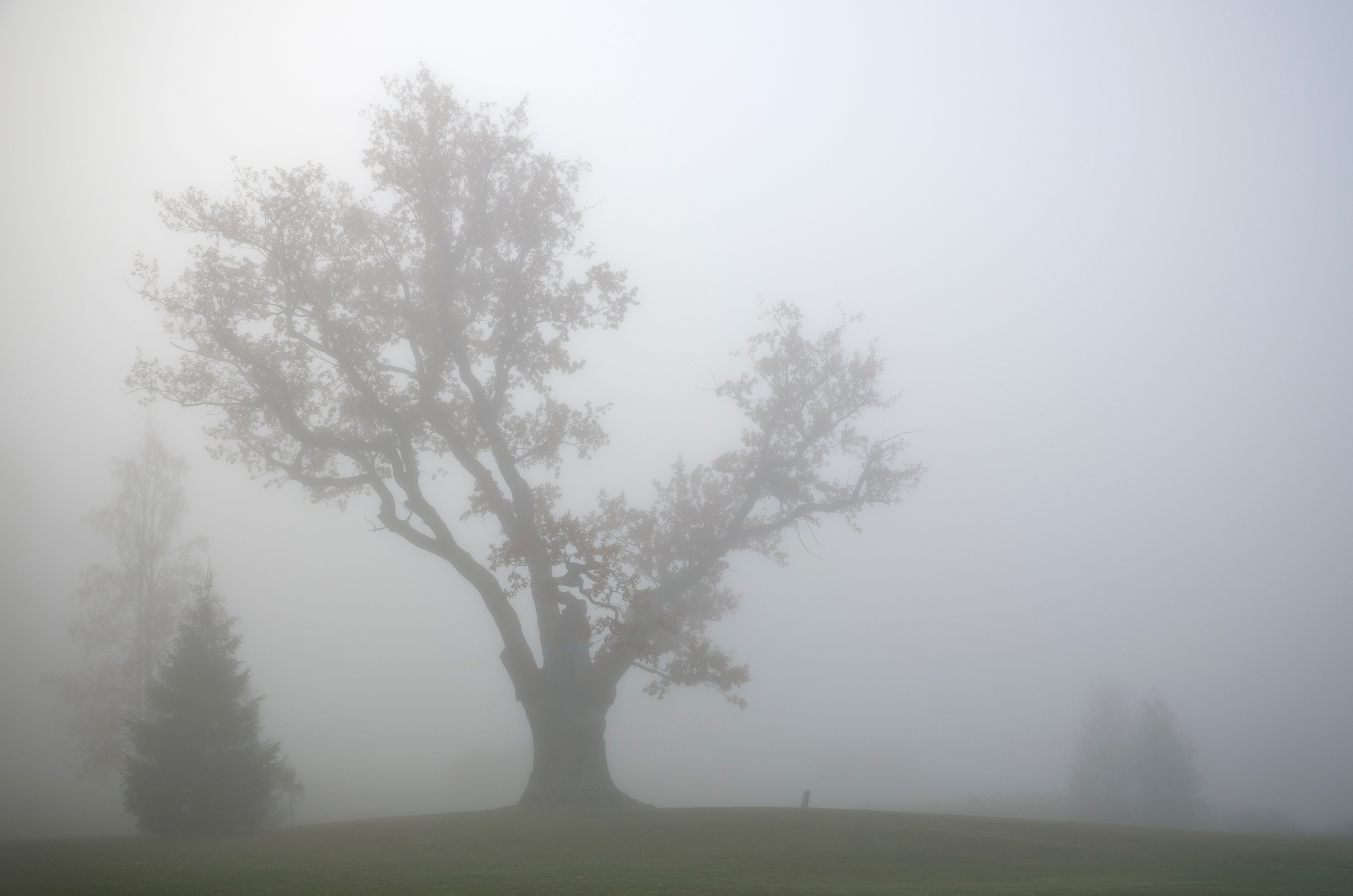
Pühajärv War Oak has the largest trunk circumference in Valga county (6.98 m)

=== Nature protection ===
The territory under nature protection composes around 20% of the whole territory of Valga County. The most important nature objects under protection are Otepää Nature Park, Karula National Park and Koiva-Mustjõe Landscape Conservation Area. There are 60 different protection areas such as national parks, nature protection areas, landscape protection areas and their sub-types such as parks, stands and arboretum. The biggest one in Valga County and also in Estonia is Otepää Nature Park with the area of 22,430 ha. The territory under protection, also including nature reserves and permanent habitats form the area of 43,431 ha.

There are 28 indigenous trees and 5 glacial boulders under protection as a single object. The highest tree under protection is Tsuura spruce and it is also the largest spruce in Estonia – the height of 29 m and the circumference of 4.32 m. The thickest tree, Pühajärv War Oak, has the circumference of 6.98 m. The biggest glacial erratic of South Estonia is located in Valga County – Helgikivi with the circumference of 30.2 m and with the volume above the land of 61 m³.

=== Substrate ===
The substrate of the county is formed by Devonian sandstones which are quite porous, rich in micas and slightly cemented. Light-coloured sandstones from the Middle Devonian Burtniek stage, clay and marl layers are spread on the majority of the territory of the county. On the narrow stripe of the county's northern part, the sandstones of the Middle Devonian Aruküla Stage become visible. They are cross-bedded with the interlayers of siltstones, clays and dolomites.

The substrate is covered by the complex of quaternary sediments (glacial, limno-glacial and fluvio-glacial). Moraine is dominant on the area of the northern and middle parts of the county. Gravels, sands, loams and bog sediments are diverged. The geological construction of the substrate is complicated (thickness is varying 10–100 m and more). The surface water lies at the depth of 0–10 m, on the hills even deeper. From the aspect of engineering geology, the ground of the county is mostly of good load-capacity, but the relief can be an obstacle for construction works.

== Economy ==
Valga County is an area of industry and agriculture but also an area of a well-known recreation and sports centre Otepää. The average gross salary in Valga County in 2013 was €729 (compared to the average salary in Estonia in 2013 – €949)

=== Entrepreneurship ===
As of 31 December 2013, there were 2,717 companies (930 self-employments and 1,787 business entities), 677 non-profit organizations and 23 foundations in Valga County. The turnover was average or higher in the following fields of economy: woodworking and manufacturing of wood and cork products, construction, food production, crop production, livestock farming and wholesale trade. Tourism is very important mainly around Otepää area. The export of products and services (142.5 mln EUR in 2013) was vastly higher than import (81 mln EUR).

=== Agriculture and livestock farming ===
In 2014 the cultivated area was 24,123 ha of which 13,554 ha was under grain, 1,236 ha was under legumes, 2,838 ha under rape and turnip rape, 93 ha under potato and 38 ha under field vegetables. By the end of 2013 the total harvest of grain was 40,662 t, legumes 2,256 t, rape and turnip rape seeds 7,184 t, potato 1,228 t and field vegetables 190 t.

There were about 24,700 herd animals of which 12,100 were cattle (including 3,700 dairy cows), 1,200 pigs, 7,700 sheep and coats. The total production of cattle breeding was 1,233 t of meat and 28,585 t of milk.

== Health and welfare ==
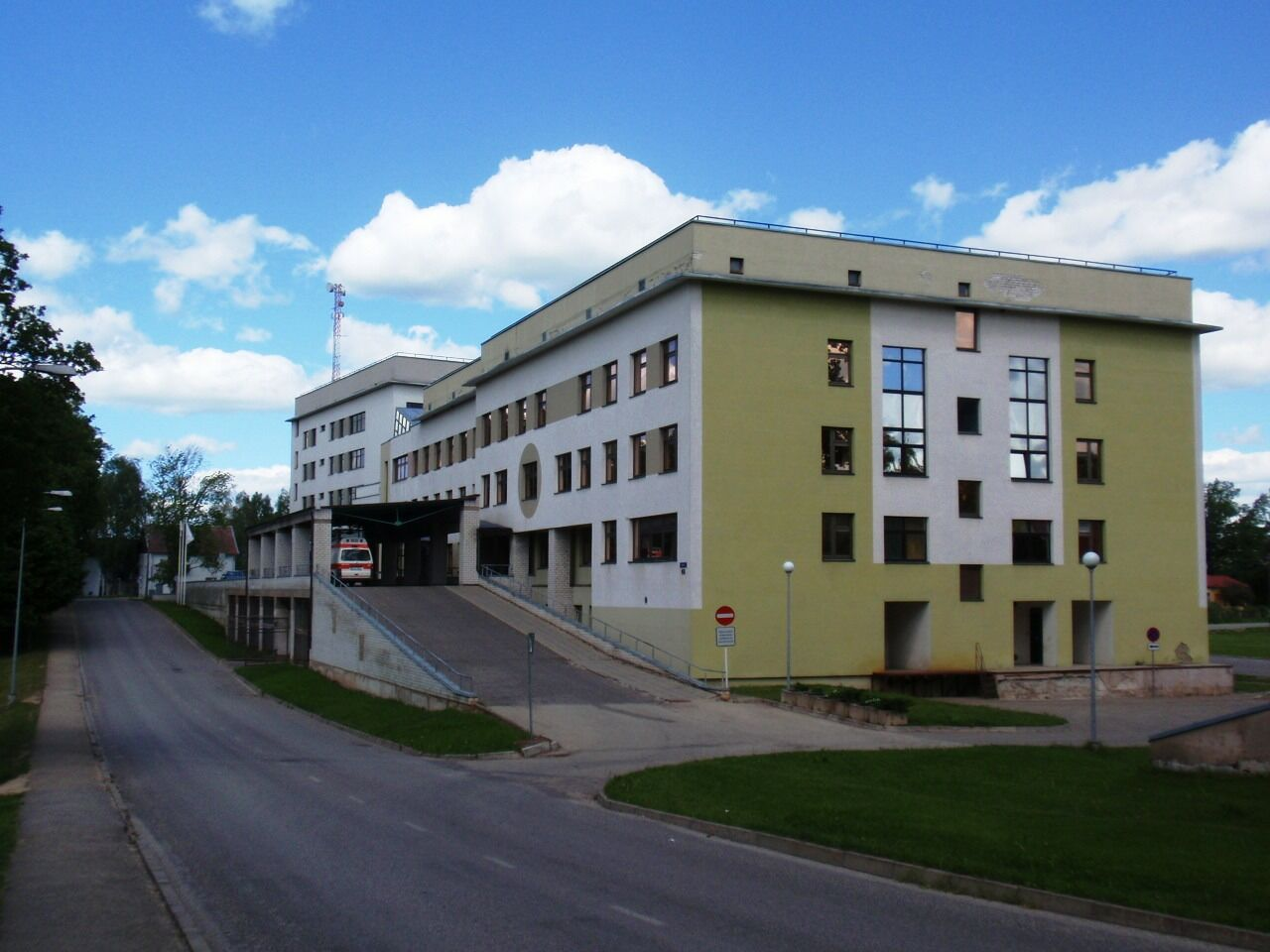
Main building of Valga hospital

Stationary health care in Valga County is provided by AS Valga Haigla, SA Otepää Tervisekeskus and SA Tõrva Haigla. SA Otepää Tervisekeskus and SA Tõrva Haigla are meant for nursing care, SA Valga Haigla also offers medical specialist help in addition to nursing care. Different out-patient specialist services are being offered in all three institutions. To provide general medical help for citizens of the county, there are 17 practice lists with 15 family physicians (GPs), 2 replacement physicians, 2 helping physicians and 19 family nurses. Family physician Merike Ausmees has the longest practice list of 2,500 patients, serving the areas of Tõrva Town, Helme and Põdrala Parish. There are 6 practice lists with more than 2,000 patients. Tõlliste and Õru Parish have the shortest list of 681 patients. By the end of 2013 health care was arranged by the County Governor but due to the changes in Health Care Law the competence has been forwarded to the Health Board as of 01.01.2013.

There are 13 institutions offering welfare services in Valga County. Hellenurme Manor is the biggest institution with 390 bed seats. Four institutions are registered as non-profit organizations, two as joint-stock companies and one as a limited-liability company. The rest is being maintained without corporate bodies. As of 2014, welfare services can be offered to 981 people, 818 bed seats have been occupied. 27 social workers and 294 social service providers offer services at clients` homes.

There are 69 manors and castles in Valga County. Sangaste Castle and Taagepera Castle (Estonian best wedding place 2007–2013) are the most popular ones. The most well-known and most visited tourism magnet is Otepää which also bears the title of Winter Capital each year from 21 December to 20 March, since 1996. The area of Otepää is known as one of the various all-in-one places where training camps and winter sports events are being held. When comparing accommodation services by Estonian counties, Valga County is holding the fourth position (after Harju County, Saaremaa and Pärnu County). As of 2013 there were 77 rooming houses, having altogether 826 rooms and 2,149 beds (data from subjects to statistics only).

== Tourism ==
There are 69 manors and castles in Valga County. Sangaste Castle and Taagepera Castle (Estonian best wedding place 2007–2013) are the most popular ones. The most well-known and most visited tourism magnet is Otepää which also bears the title of Winter Capital each year from 21 December to 20 March, since 1996. The area of Otepää is known as one of the various all-in-one places where training camps and winter sports events are being held. When comparing accommodation services by Estonian counties, Valga County is holding the fourth position (after Harju County, Saaremaa and Pärnu County). As of 2013 there were 77 rooming houses, having altogether 826 rooms and 2,149 beds (data from subjects to statistics only).

The most visited events of the county are Rally Estonia and the international Valga Military History Festival (the best tourism event of South Estonia in 2013). The most visited objects are Kuutsemäe Resort and Tehvandi Sport Centre. The best-known tourist attractions by areas:

=== Tõrva area ===
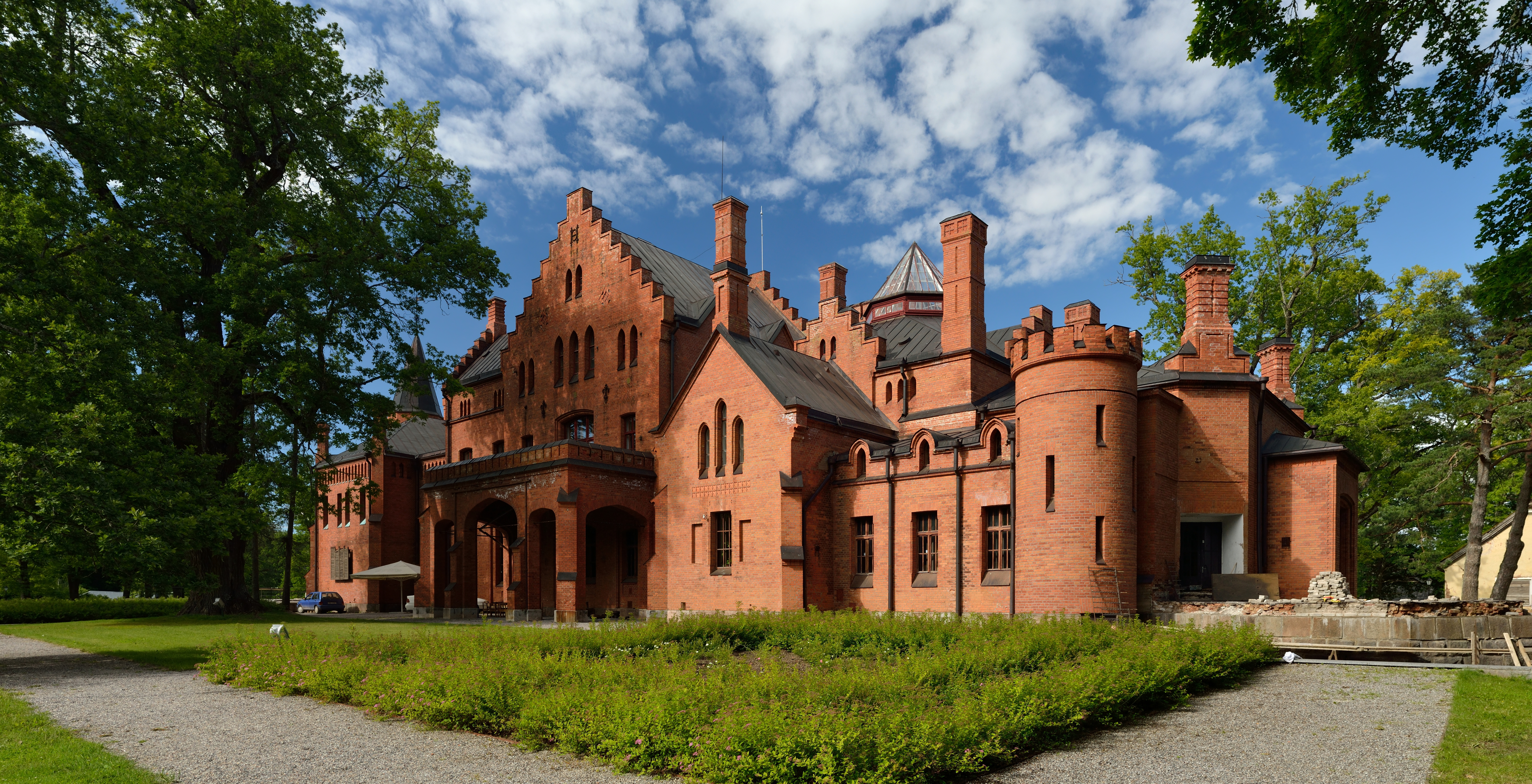
Main building of Sangaste Castle

In Tõrva: The War of Independence Memorial Column and the park of Tõrva Gymnasium, resting areas of Lake Riiska and Lake Vanamõisa, Tikste Old Valley, Tõrva Dance Hill.

Helme Parish: Barclay de Tolly Mausoleum, Ruins of Helme Castle, Helme caves, Helme Museum, Helme Fountain of Sacrifice, piano collection manufactured by Estonian piano manufacturers in Helme Manor, the memorial stones of Major-General Jaan Soots and Aleksander Jaakson, the Chapel of Mats Erdell at Taagepera Cemetery. Põdrala Parish: Pikassilla resting area with the River Väike-Emajõgi flowing into Lake Võrtsjärv, birth places of Henrik Visnapuu and Johann Paul.

Hummuli Parish: Koorküla caves, Lake Valgjärv in Koorküla, Lake Udsu (the third-deepest lake in Estonia), a pine from the times of the Great Northern War, a thousand-year-old cemetery, Hummuli battlefield.

=== Otepää area ===
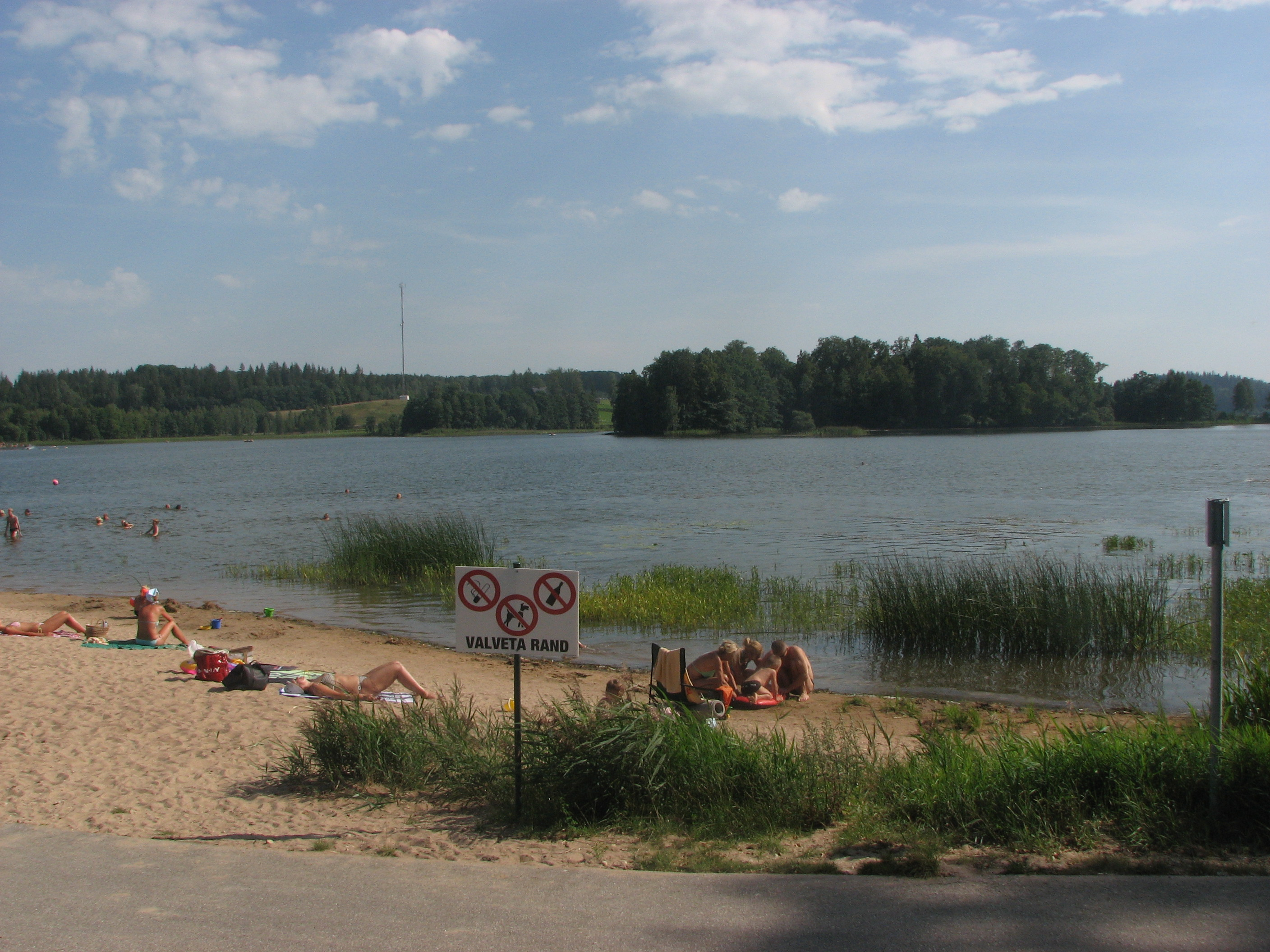
Lake Pühajärv in Otepää parish

In Otepää Parish: Otepää Castle, Väike Munamägi Hill, Apteekrimägi Hill, Lake Pühajärv, Otepää St Mary's Lutheran Church, The Memorial Column of the Estonian War of Independence, Tehvandi Sport Centre, Märdi Milloak, Pühajärv War Oak.

In Palupera Parish: Palupera and Hellenurme manor complexes with parks, Hellenurme Watermill and resting area, the Middendoff family cemetery.

In Puka Parish: Kuigatsi Manor Park and buildings in the Village of Kuigatsi, a group of indigenous trees in Puka, Komsi Stand, Aakre Manor buildings and park in the village of Aakre, the housing of Puka Town centre (a bank building, a railway station and a pharmacy from the I Estonian Republic times), Vooremägi Hill, Kuigatsi or Puka Town Hill, Ristimägi Hill in the village of Kähri.

In Sangaste Parish: Sangaste Castle and park, Sangaste Church, Sangaste cemetery, Sangaste Town Hill, Harimägi Hill, the birthplace of a writer August Gailit.

=== Valga area ===
In Valga: Valga Freedom Monument, Valga City Hall, St. John's Church, a sculpture "Nipernaadi", a memorial plaque to Stefan Batory, a memorial plaque to Johannes Märtson, a monument to Alfred Neuland – the first Olympic winner in Estonia, Valga Railway Station. In Karula Parish: Karula and Kaagjärve Manor complexes, Karula Church, Pikkjärve landscape area and nature objects. In Taheva Parish: rood trees in Kalliküla, a holy pine in Hargla, Tsirgumäe Sacrificial Stone, Tsirgumäe Sacrificial Pine, RMK Tellingumäe viewing tower, Taheva Manor complex with a park, Lake Aheru, Oore pine forests, Mustajõe-Koiva landscape protection area. In Tõlliste Area: Paju Manor, Paju Memorial Monument. In Õru Parish: Lota Manor in the village of Lota, the birthplace of the poet Friedrich Kuhlbars in the village of Uniküla, the birthplace of the veterinary scientist Elmar Roots in the village of Priipalu, the birthplace of a painter Kristjan Teder, Uniküla caves in the village of Uniküla.

== Culture ==
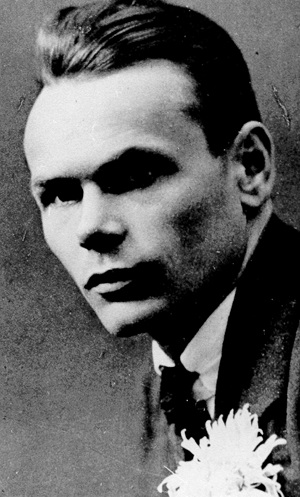
Henrik Visnapuu was born in Helme

=== Literature ===
There are many people from Valga County who have changed the literary landscape. Their creation and activity in the 20th century is related to Valga County. The best-known writer of Valga County is Hella Wuolijoki (1886-1954) from the village of Ala, known world-wide by her plays written in Finnish, giving an overview of life in Finland. In her first works she talks a lot about Valga County.

The poet, playwright, and literary critic Henrik Visnapuu, one of the activists and central figures of a literary group Siuru was born in Helme. The plot of the novel "Toomas Nipernaadi", written by August Gailit (1891–1960), is not factually related to the birthplace of the author but the main character has the local prototype from Valga County. August Gailit, the founder and leading figure of Siuru, was born in Kuiksilla, near to Sangaste Manor. In his youth he moved a lot within Valga County. His family moved from Sangaste to Laatre Manor and from Laatre Manor to Tsirguliina Town in 1906.

Herta Laipaik (1921–2008) was born in Hummuli at the Kaprani farm. Many of her books contain folklore about Helme Parish or the history of Helme. The story of her novel "Hallid luiged" ("Grey swans"; 1986) takes place in a small town called Tõrvatu (Tõrva) and in Valga. One of the most famous short story writers of Estonia, Mats Traat, was born in 1936 in Palupera Parish, in the village of Meema. Many of his books are about Valga County. His characters often speak Estonian Otepää dialect.

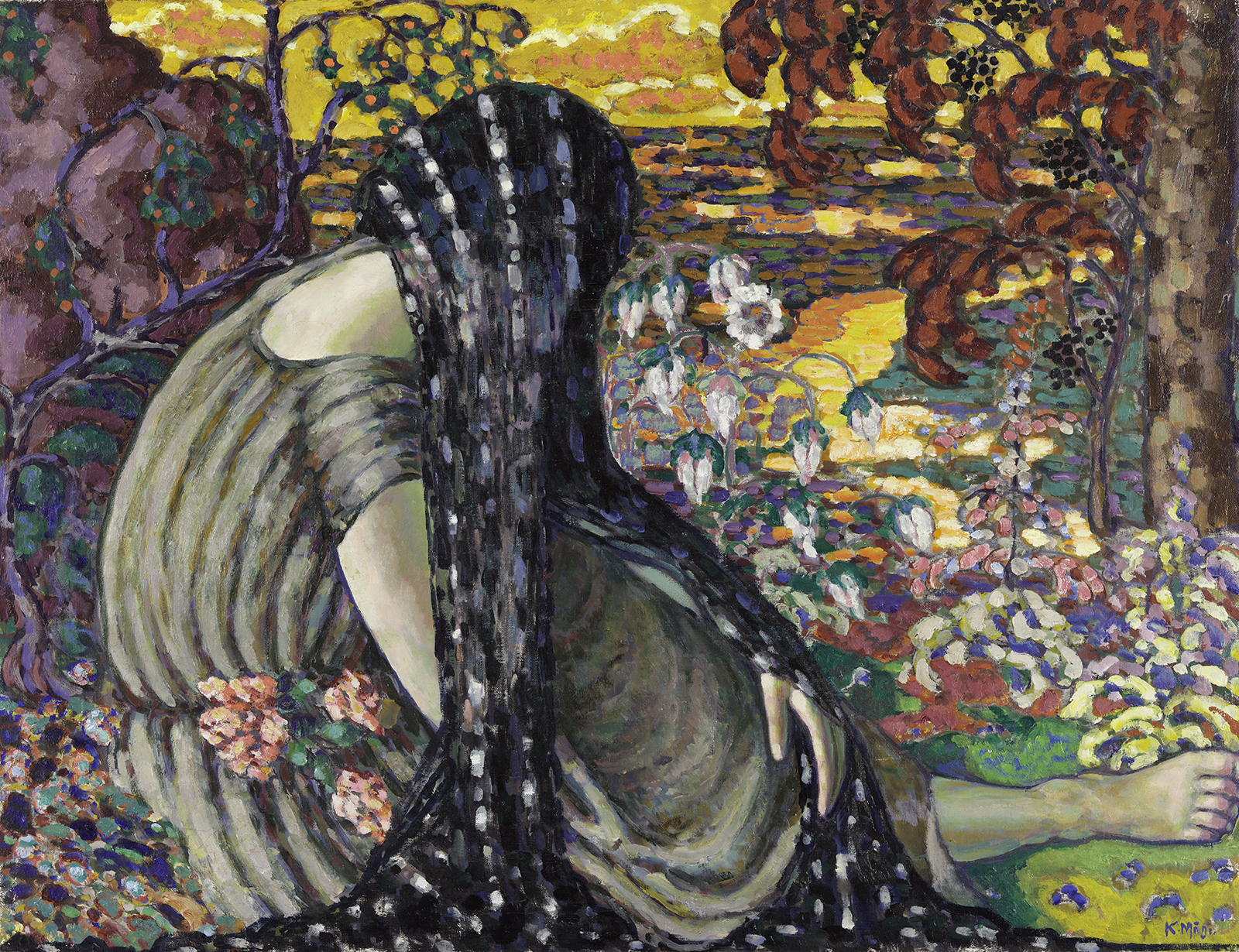
Konrad Mägi "Meditation (Landscape with a lady)", an oil painting from 1915 to 1916

The most popular author of modern science fiction literature is Indrek Hargla, born in Hargla in 1970. He chose his writer-name by his birthplace. The series of his criminal novels about the pharmacist Melchior are the present-day masterpieces of the Estonian science-fiction literature.

The plots of short stories "Meeting in Taagepera" and "1969", written by Mehis Heinsaar (born in 1973), take place in Taagepera.

Jakob Hurt, a folklorist and a linguist, also the excitor of the Estonian public life, worked as a teacher in Otepää in the years 1872–1880. A Finnish-Swedish writer Ester Ståhlberg (1870-1950) wrote about Jakob Hurt and his life in Otepää in her historical novel "Towards the Sunrise".

=== Music and dramatics ===
A composer, conductor and music critic Aleksander Läte (1860–1948) was born in present-day Valga County.

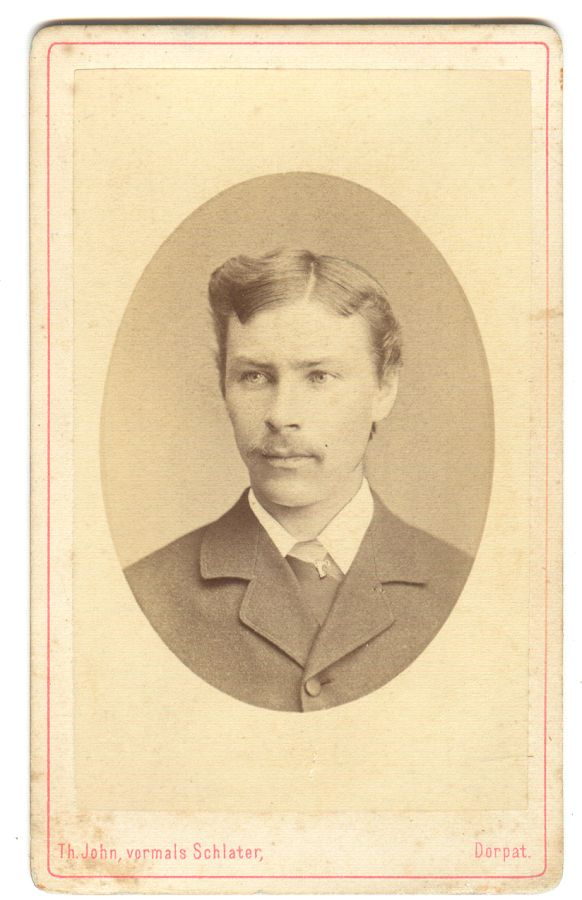
Helilooja Aleksander Läte, TaM F107 (F85-1)

A teacher of folk instruments and bagpipe master Ants Taul was born in Tõrva in 1950. Since 1995 he has been a folk instrument teacher in Viljandi Culture Academy. He has a family band called "Torupill" (1995) which has performed in many countries. Abi Zeider (1920–1999), a trumpeter, was born in Valga. He played in jazz and variety orchestras and he was also a concertmaster of the variety orchestra of the Estonian Television and Estonian Radio. A recognized conductor Peeter Lilje (1950–1993) was born in Valga where he also got his musical education. Lilje was a concert-master and conductor of "Estonia" and the principal conductor of ERSO and Oulu City Orchestra. He conducted symphony orchestras in many countries world-wide.

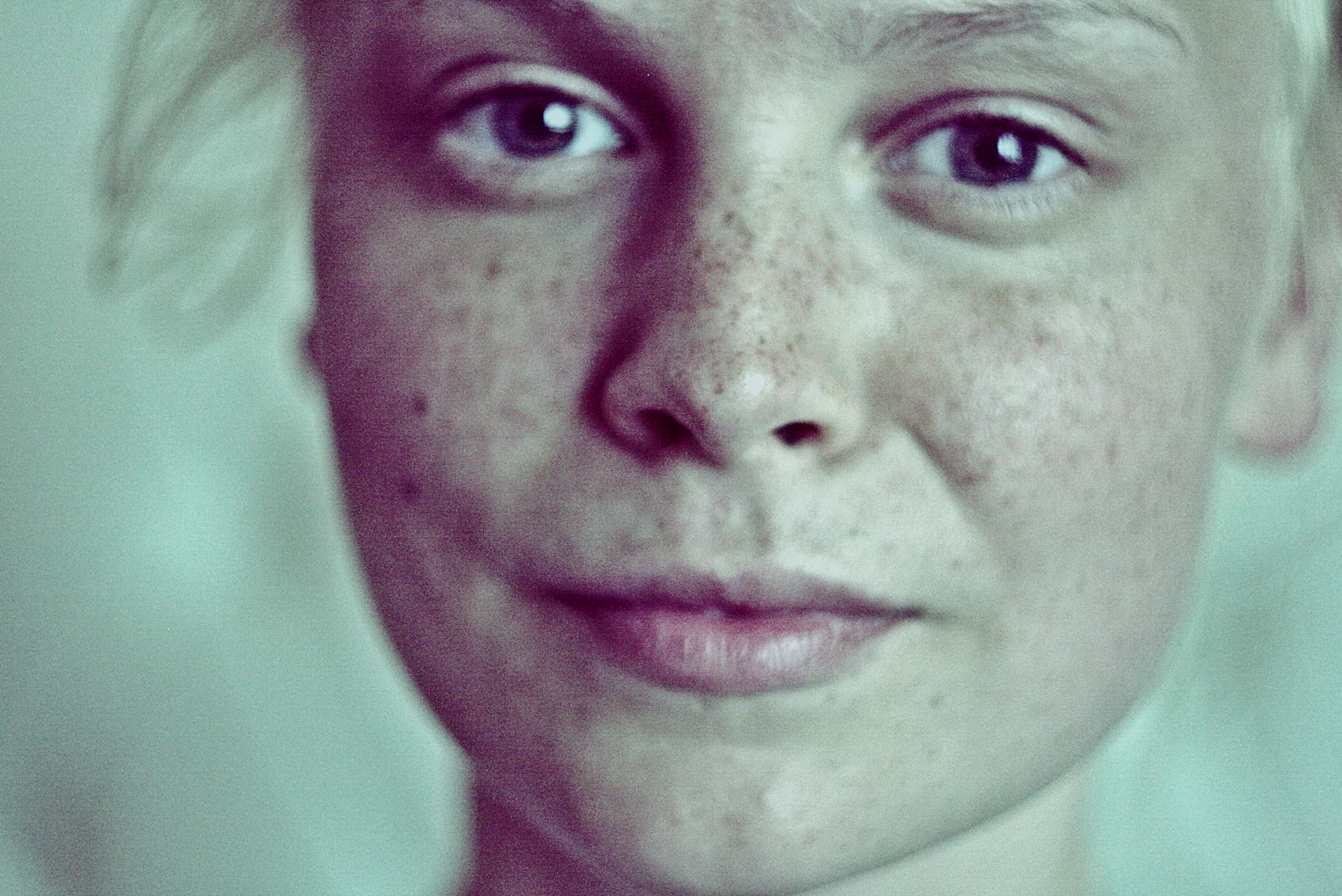
An actress Adeele Jaago from a popular show “Kättemaksukontor“ is from Tõrva City

Madis Kõiv (1929-2014) spent his childhood in Tõrva and in Valga. He worked as a lecturer and scientist. He wrote plays, prose and radio dramas and he was interested in painting. He won the "Tuglas Short Story Award" three times and he was the cavalier of "4th Class Order of National Coat of Arms".

Lembit Eelmäe (1927–2009), born in Helme, was one of the best-known actors of Valga County. He got popularity by his role as Jürka in a play called Põrgupõhja uus Vanapagan written by Jaan Tooming. The actress Meta Luts (1905–1958) was born in Riidaja Parish. She started her career from the theatre Endla, worked in Estonia and in the Estonian Drama Theatre. Actress Silvia Laidla (1927–2012) was born in Valga and spent over fifty years on the stage and appeared in films, television and radio. The actress Anne Veesaar was born in Valga in 1957. She has worked in Rakvere Theatre and in Vanalinnastuudio. One of her best-known roles is in a TV show Õnne 13. Adeele Jaago is a well-known actress and producer of the theatre Ugala. She was born in 1989 in Tõrva. Her best-known role is in a popular TV show Kättemaksukontor. Aarne Soro, born in Tõrva, is also an actor of the theatre Ugala. Lea Tormis, known as a theatre scientist and a critic, was born in the village of Pikassilla in 1932.

=== Sport ===
Skiing and bodybuilding have been the most practiced sports in Valga County. Long-term sport traditions have given Estonians their first Olympic winner Alfred Neuland, who was awarded with gold medal in 1920 Summer Olympics in Antwerp. Neuland was born in Valga in 1895. In 1924 a silver medal from Paris was added to his collection. Bruno Junk, a racewalker, was born in Valga and he has won two Olympic bronze medals – one from Helsinki in 1952 and one from Melbourne in 1956.

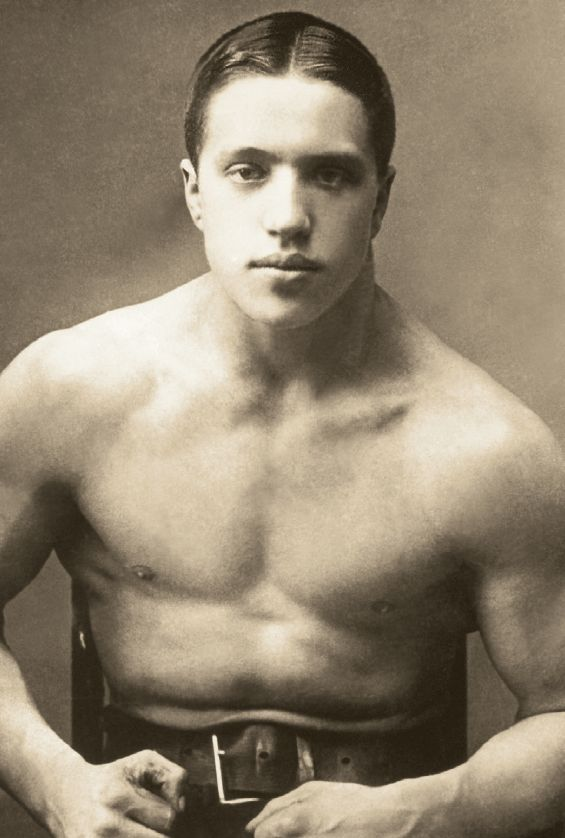
Alfred Neuland - Estonian weightlifter and the first Estonian Olympic winner

August Englas was born in Otepää, in the former Pühajärve Parish and he is the Greek-Roman wrestling world champion of 1953 and freestyle wrestling world champion of 1954. Pavel Loskutov is a light-athlete from Valga (precisely from the area of Valka) and he has participated Olympic Games for four times. His coach was Raimond Luts and his best result is a silver medal in men's marathon run from European Championships in 2002.

There are three light-athletics records set in Valga. The best-known record is set in javelin throw by Andrus Värnik 87.83 in 19.08.2003. There are two top records marked in the Book of Records – Anu Teesaar's result in women's decathlon of 6,411 (5.09.2004) and Jekaterina Jutkina's result in 5 km racewalking of 24,7 (7.06.2003). Valga County has only one result to be shown in ballgames. It was in handball, won by the team of Valga Maret Sport in 1992. Currently Valga has a champions league team in basketball and in handball.

Many well-known coaches are from Valga. Rein Ahun has been a coach to Märt Israel, a light-athlete, and to Margus Hunt who is currently playing in NFL. One of the best handballers in Estonia, Kaupo Palmar, started his trainings in Valga in 1985. He was chosen twice to be the best Estonian handballer. His coaches were Ebba Lõokene and Ülo Mere.

Many Cross Country World Cup competitions have been organised in Otepää, the wintersports and skiing town of Valga County. The first competition took place in 1999. In 2003–2012 the Cross Country World Cup competitions were held in Otepää every year. The next competition was planned to be held in 2015. Many well-known sport celebrities like road riders Rein Taaramäe, Tanel Kangert and Rene Mandri and cross-country skiers Aivar Rehemaa and Algo Kärp went to school in the Otepää Branch of Audentes Sports Gymnasium.

Some of the best-known winter athletes from Valga County are skier Elmo Kassin (Valga), a threshold participant in the Olympics, a skier Kein Einaste (Sangaste), a biathlete Kalju Ojaste (Otepää) and a sledger Helen Novikov (Tõrva). Kaarel Zilmer, a well-known sports teacher and the leader of the Estonian Ski Team of two Olympic Games, comes from the former Kaagjärve Parish.

Sports activities are coordinated by the Sports Association of Valga County, established on 30 November 1995.

=== Media ===
The office of the local newspaper Valgamaalane is located in Valga and it is being issued three times a week. Together with the newspapers Pärnu Postimees, Sakala, Virumaa Teataja and Järva Teataja the newspaper Valgamaalane also belongs to the media company AS Ühinenud Ajalehed.

The events of Tõrva Town, Helme and Põdarala Parish are included in a local Helme Kihelkonnaleht which is being issued once in a month. A local newspaper Otepää Teataja is being issued twice a month by Otepää, Palupera, Puka and Sangaste Parish.

The only local radio station Ruut FM is located in Valga.

=== Well-known cultural and public figures ===
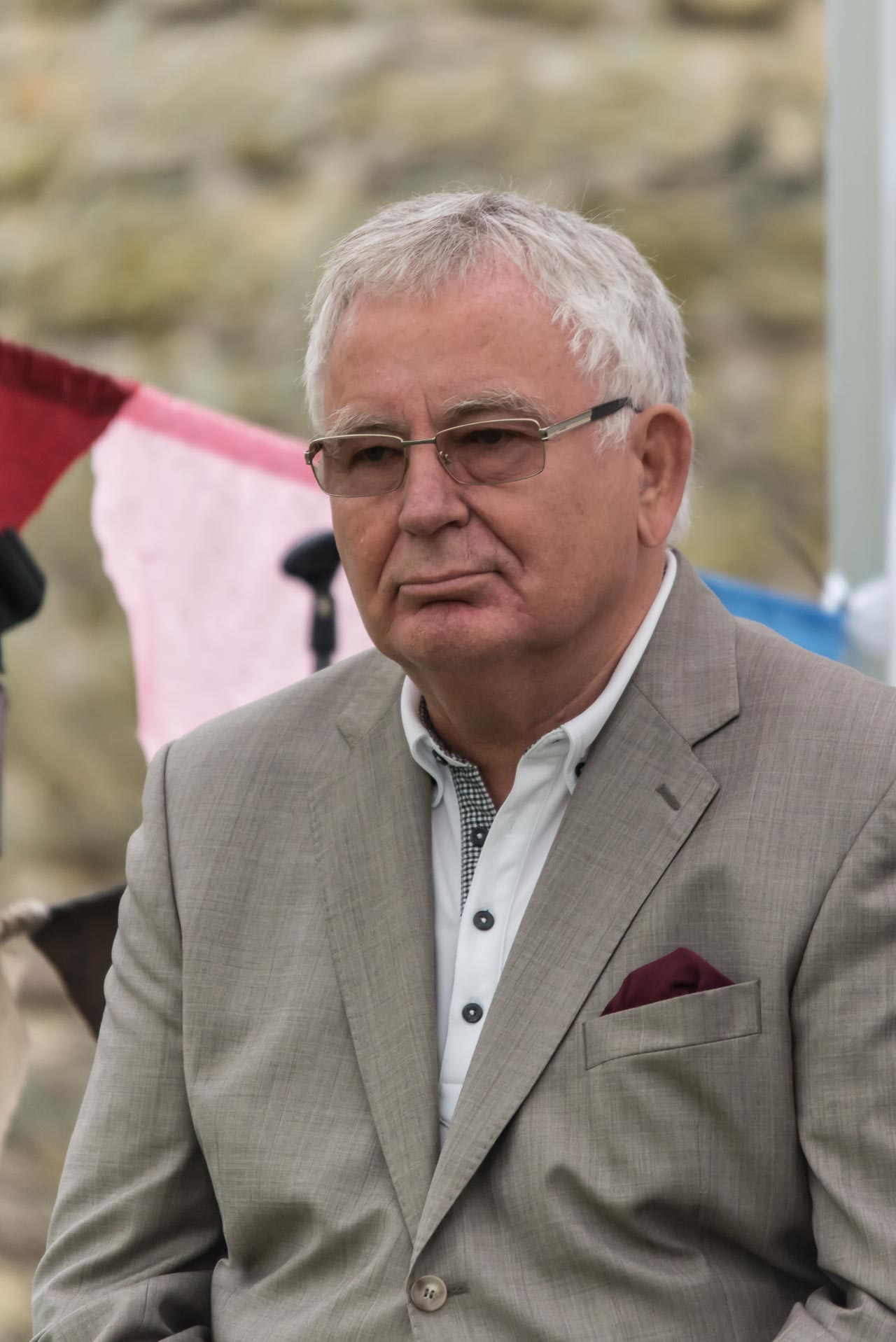
Tiit Vähi, 2016

- Paul Andreas von Rennenkampff (1790–1857) was a Baltic German nobleman, military commander and Statesman from Helme
- Friedrich Wilhelm Rembert von Berg (1794–1874), nobleman, statesman, diplomat and general of Baltic German descent from Sangaste
- Jānis Cimze (1814—1881), a pedagogue and a musician, the manager of Cimze Seminary in Valga
- Carl Hehn (1821–1875), a Baltic German agricultural scientist from Otepää
- Kaarel Parts (1873–1940), judge and politician from Otepää Parish; Chief Justice of Estonia, 1919/1940.
- Konrad Mägi (1878–1925), a painter and a pedagogue, born in Hellenurme Parish.
- Jaan Soots (1880–1942), a military commander, born in Helme Parish.
- Henrik Visnapuu (1889–1951), a poet and dramatist, born in Helme Parish.
- August Gailit [1891–1960), a writer, born in Sangaste Parish.
- Eduard Ole (1898–1995), a painter, born in Karula Parish.
- Endel Aruja (1911–2008), physicist specialising in X-ray crystallography from Soontaga
- Harri Õunapuu (born 1947), agronomist and former politician and govt. minister from Sangaste Parish
- Tiit Vähi (born 1947), a politician and an economist, born in Kaagjärve; Prime Minister of Estonia from 1995 to 1997 and acting Prime Minister for several months during 1992.
- Paul Varul (born 1952), a lawyer, politician and civil servant.
- Urmas Ott, (1955–2008), a TV journalist, born and educated in Otepää.
- Madis Vihmann (born 1995), footballer from Sangaste who played over 175 games and 19 for Estonia

== Education and youth work ==
In the academic year of 2013/2014 there were 23 educational institutions in Valga County – 20 municipal schools (administered by local governments), two official state schools and one private school. 7 gymnasiums and high schools, 13 basic schools and one correspondence school belong to the municipality. Valga Jaanikese School and Valga County Vocational Training Center are state schools. The only private school of the county is the Otepää Branch of Audentes Sports Gymnasium.

The biggest schools of the county are (by the number of students in 2013/2014): Valga Elementary School (846), Tõrva Gymnasium (446), Valga County Vocational Training Center (415), Valga Russian Gymnasium (391) and Otepää Gymnasium (387). Since 1 September, Valga Russian Gymnasium is proceeding as an elementary school under the name of Valga Priimetsa School.

According to the data from Estonian Information System of Education there are 7 hobby schools in Valga County: Valga Music School, Tõrva Music School, Otepää Music School, Puka Art School, Valga Culture and Hobby Centre, Valga County Youth Technical Centre and Valga Ukrainian Sunday School Kalõna.

In 2014 there were 3,700 students and 481 teachers (including the members of school managements) attending school life. In addition to teachers, many specialists work in schools: leisure time managers, information managers, speech therapists, psychologists, social pedagogues and specialists. Jelena Sljusartšuk, a teacher of Valga Jaanikese School, was awarded the title "Teacher of the Year 2014".

== Insignia ==
Coat of arms of Valga county

=== Coat of arms ===
The shield of the coat of arms has diagonally been cut in two parts. The upper part is dark blue and there are four five-branch silver stars (the number of former districts that formed the present-day Valga County). The lower part is silver. The blue tone on the coat of arms has the colour code of 285˚C according to the international PANTONE Matching System.

=== Flag ===
The flags of the counties were confirmed similarly – the flags are green and white and the upper part bears the coat of arms of a county. The proportion of width and length is 7:11 and the normal size of the flag is 1,050x1,650 mm.

== Gallery ==
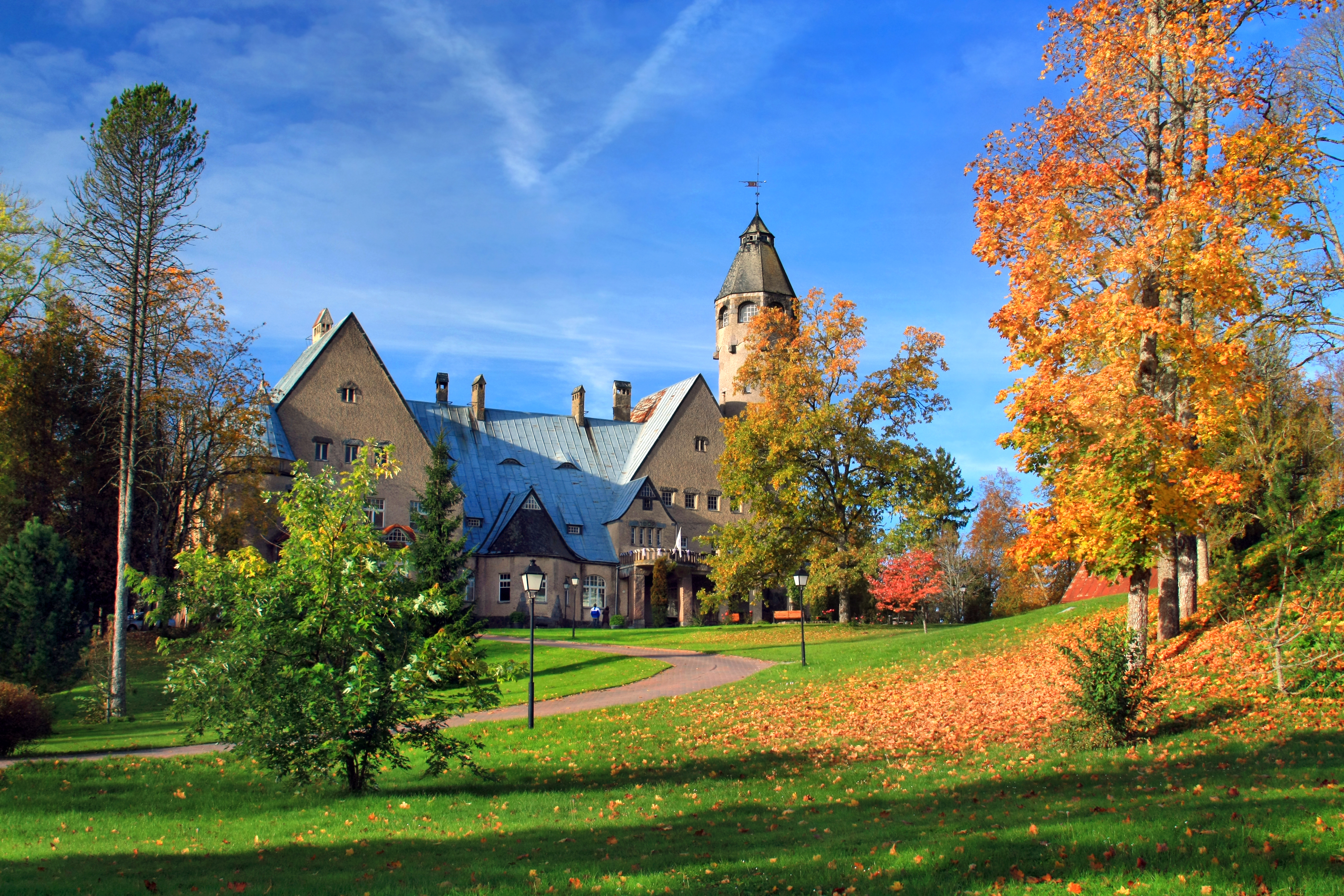
Taagepera manor main building

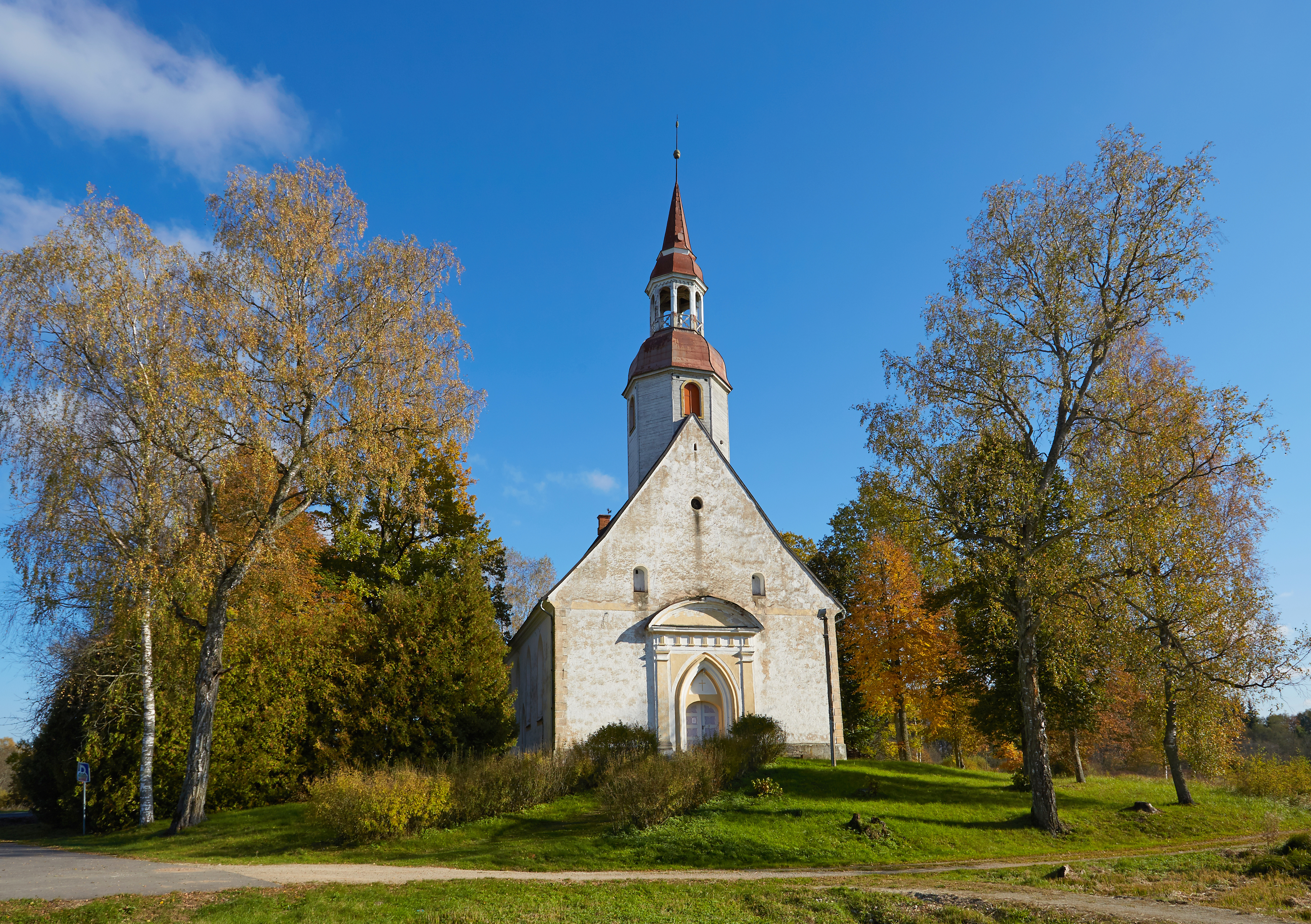
Sangaste church

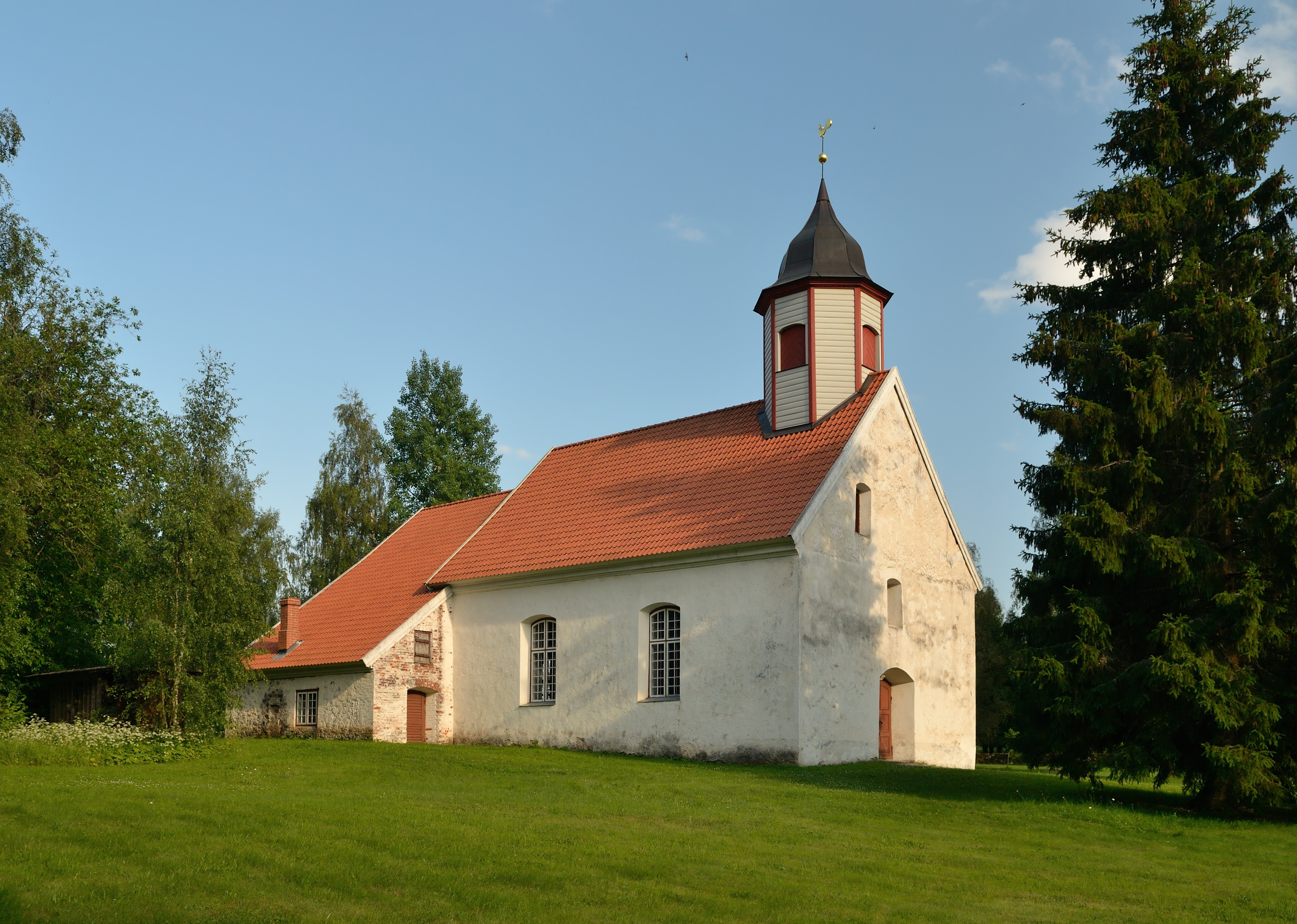
Taagepera church

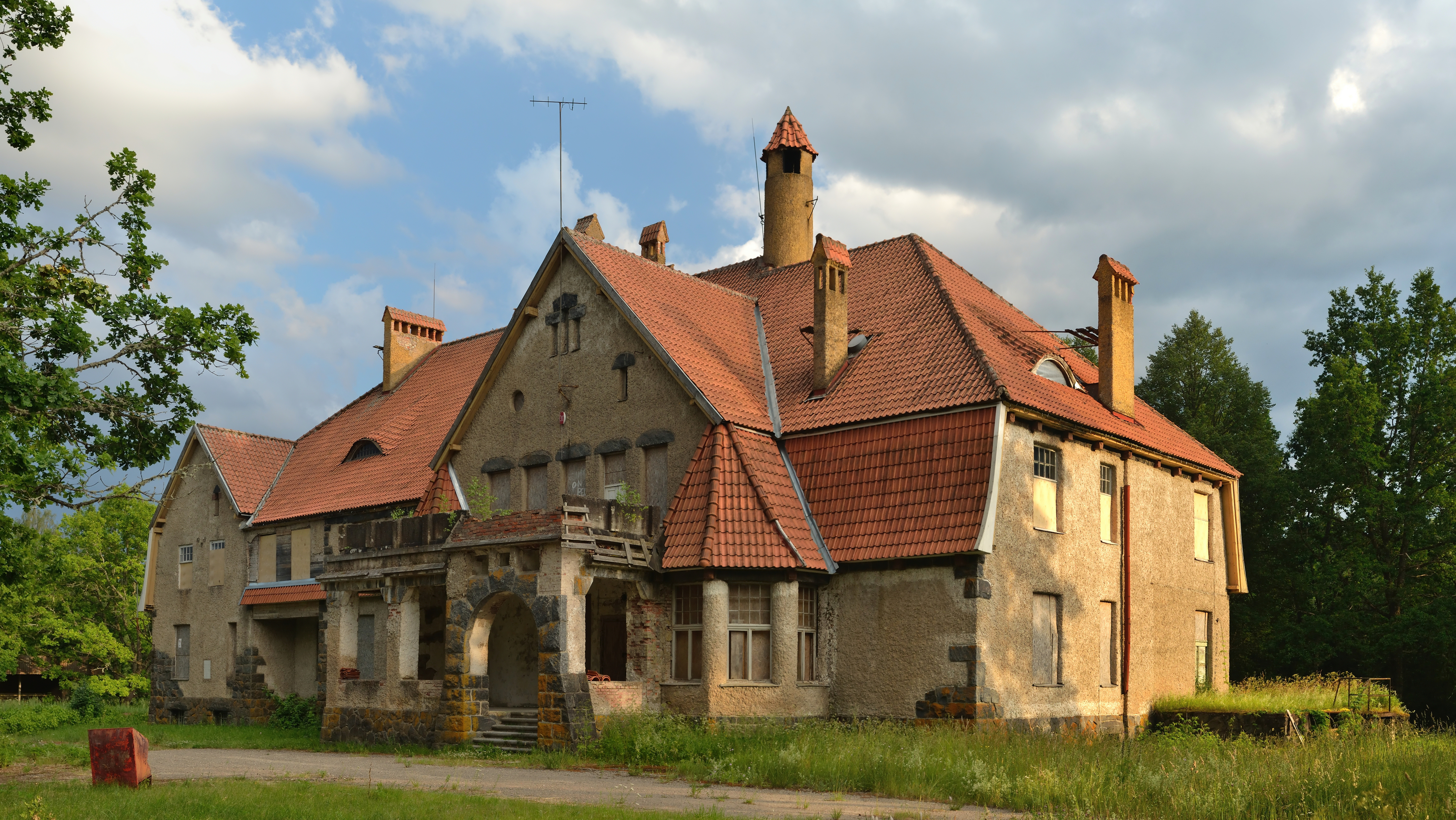
Holdre manor

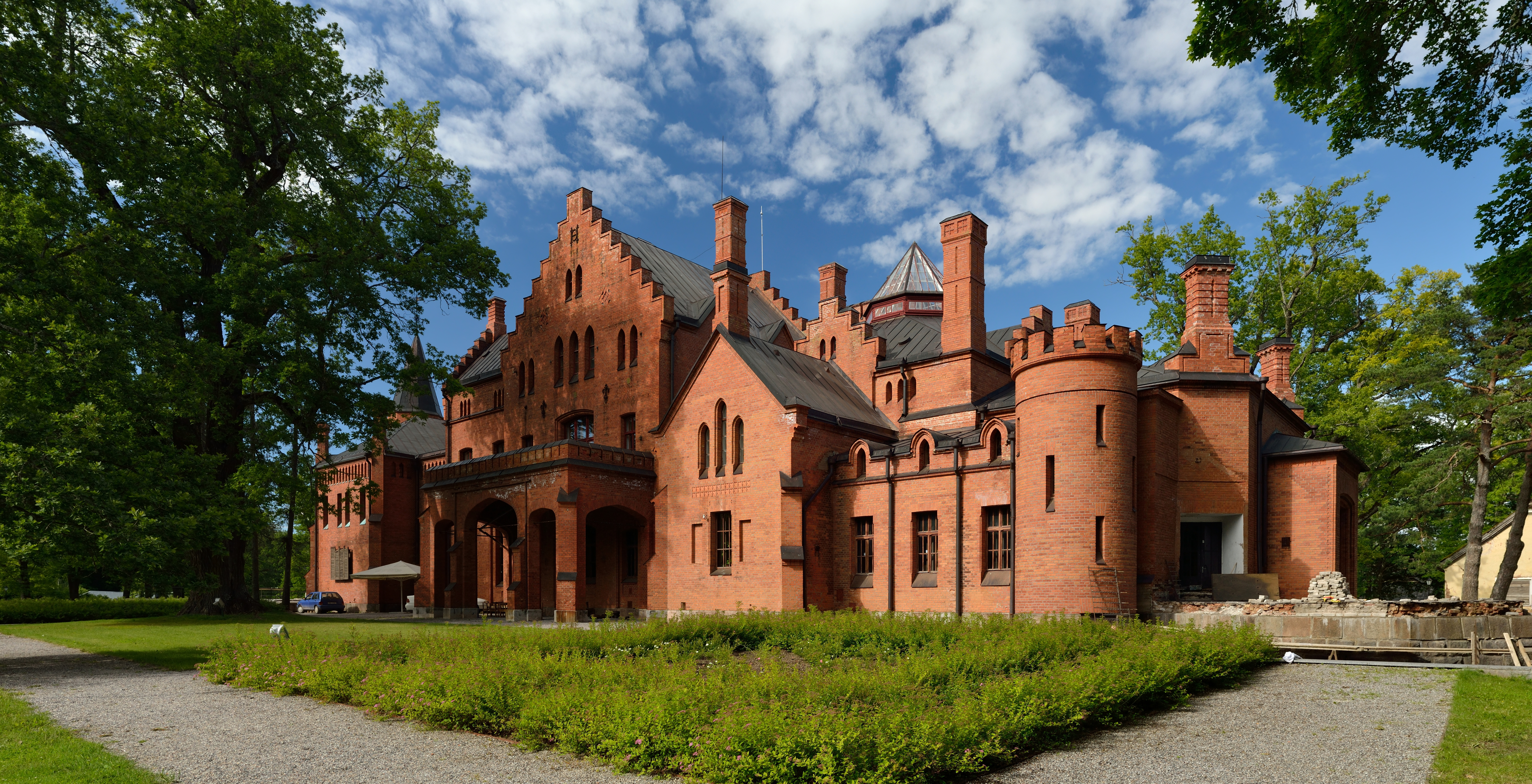
Sangaste manor

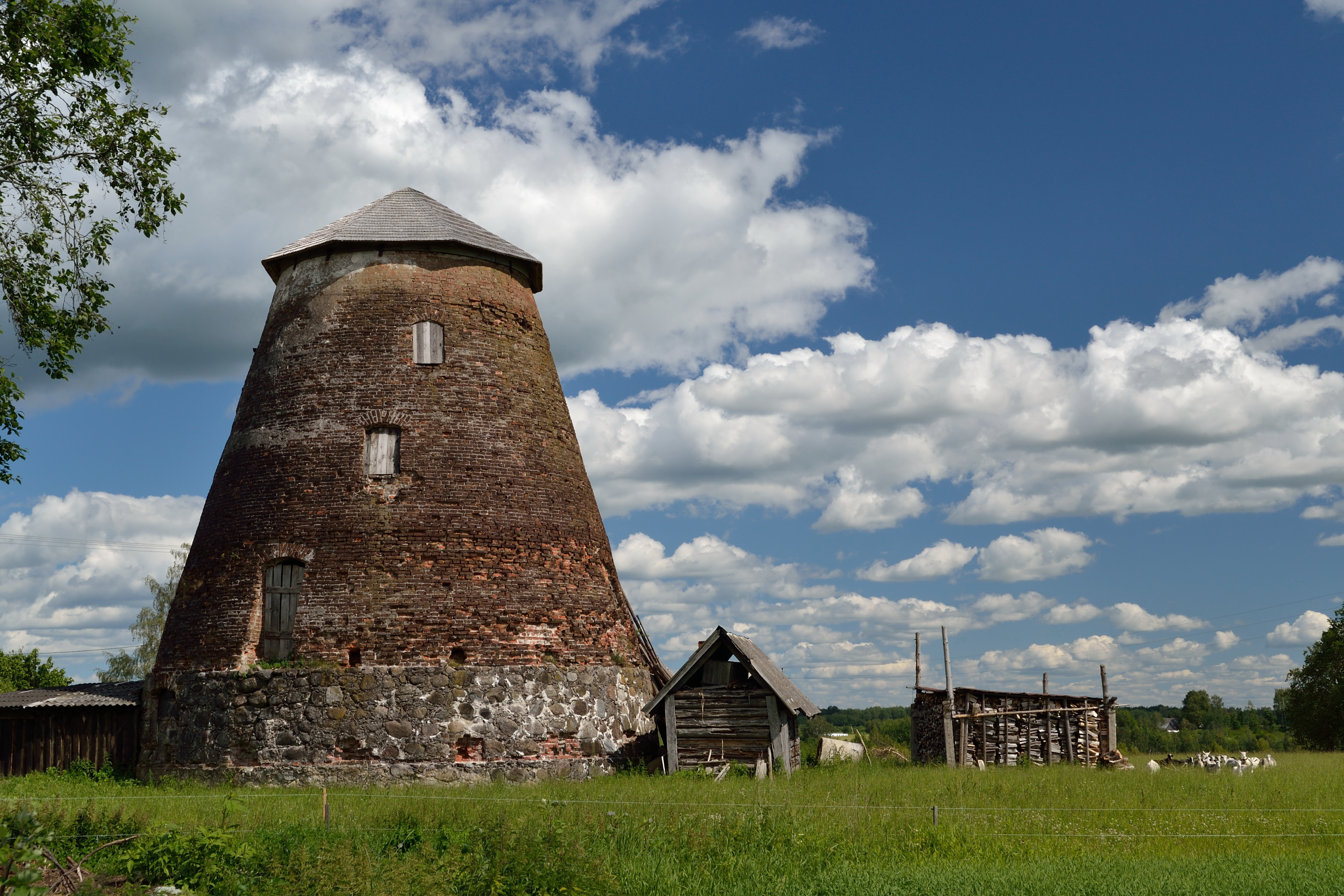
Kuigatsi manor windmill

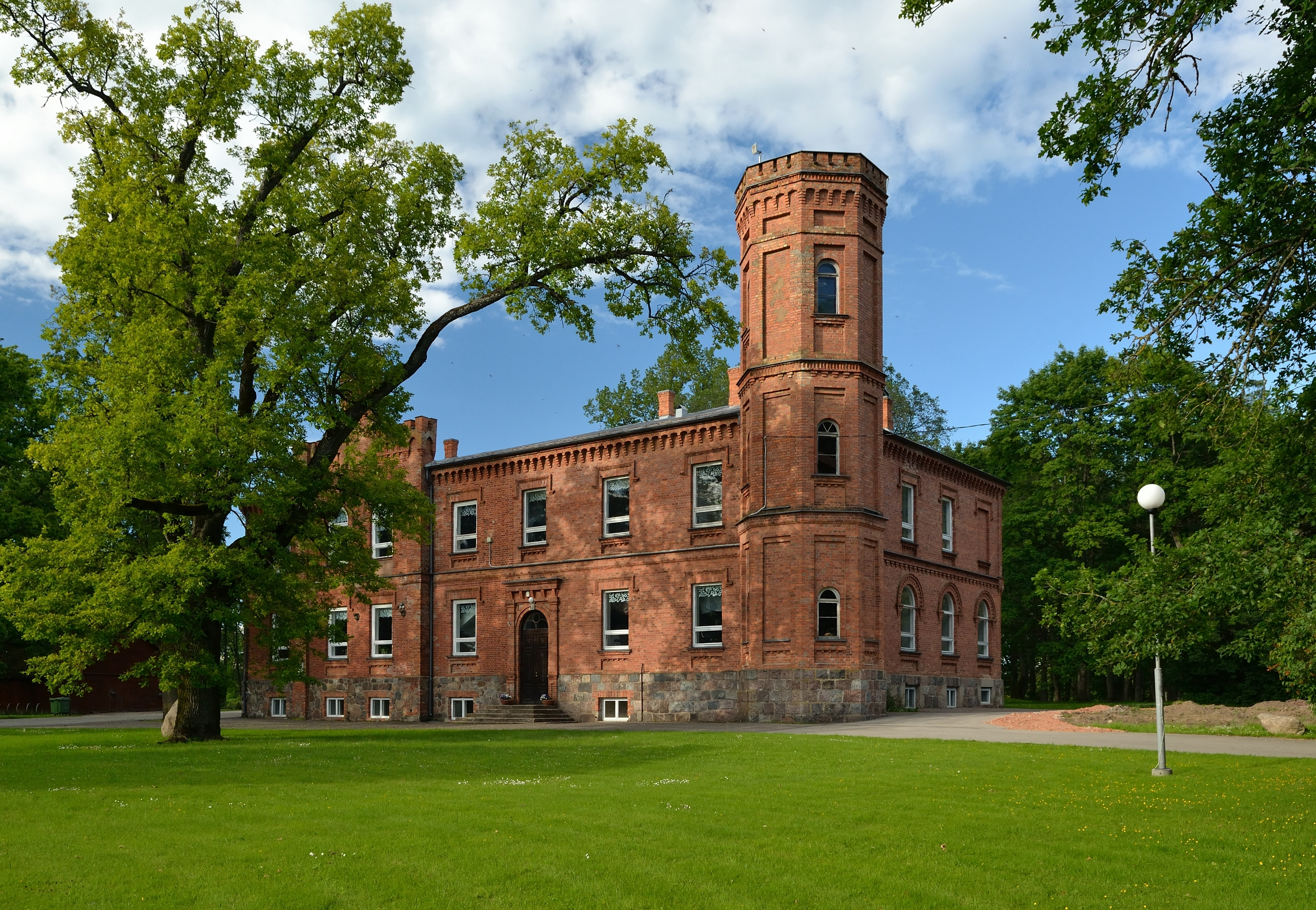
Hummuli manor

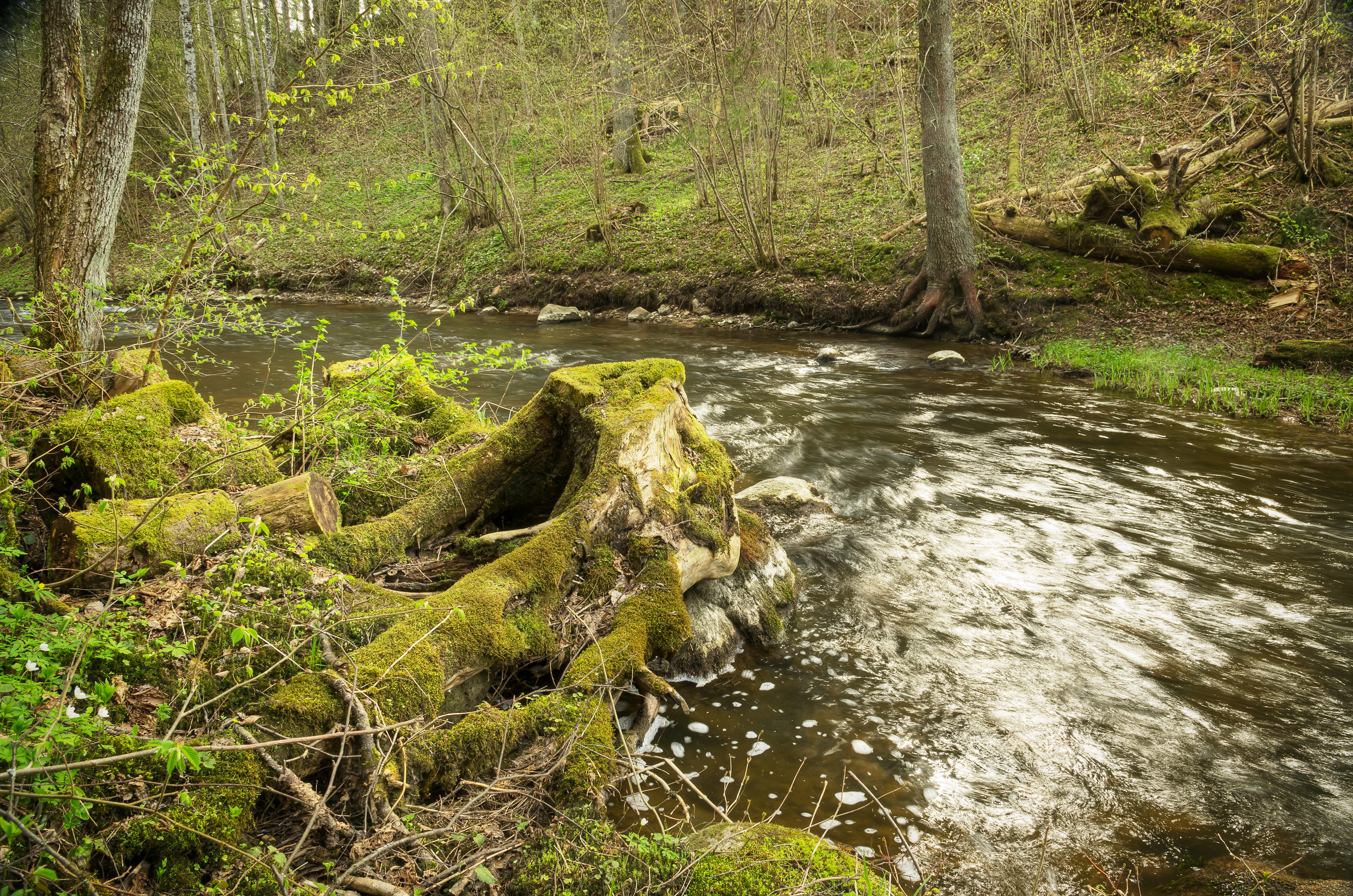
Väike Emajõgi in Märdi

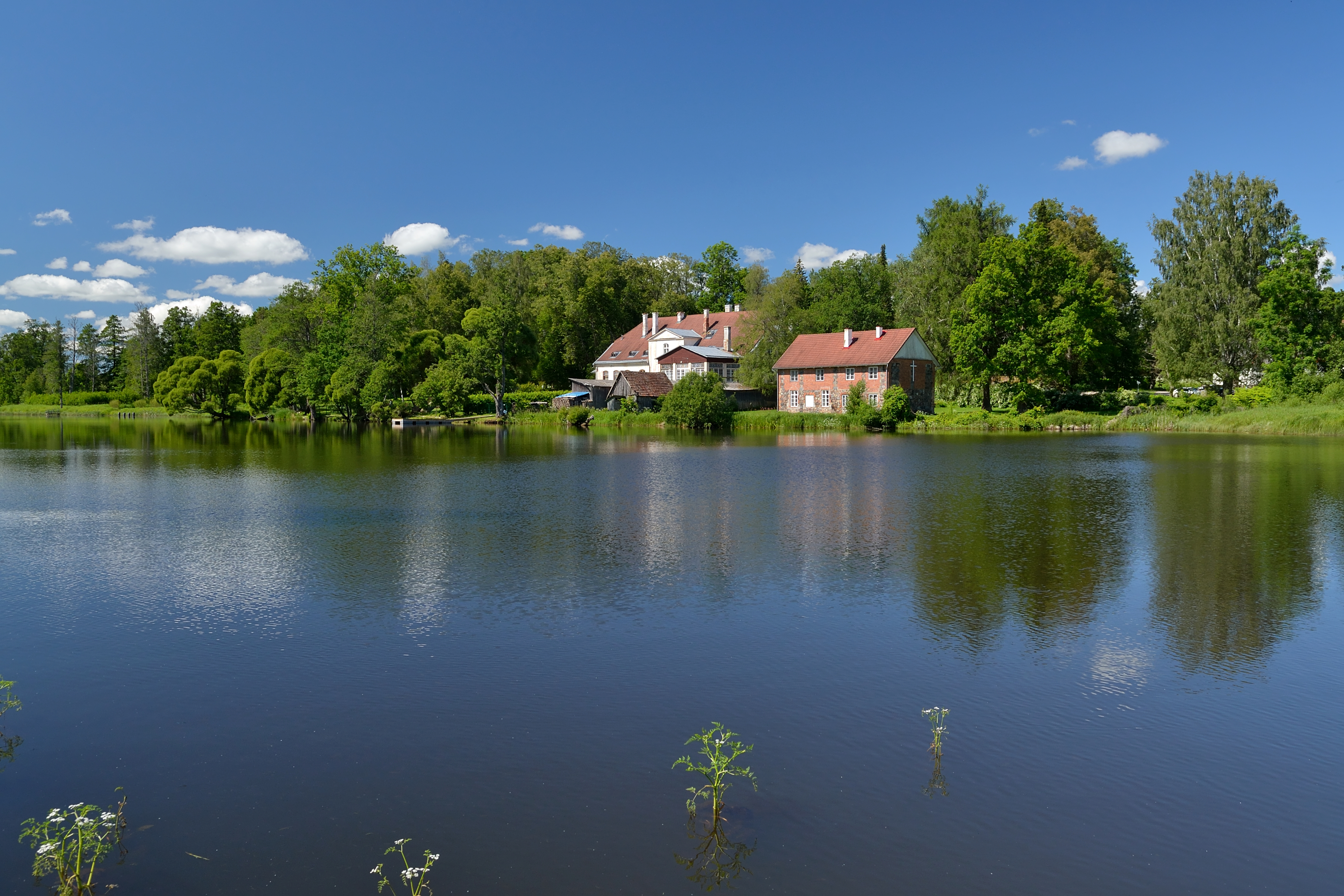
Hellenurme manor dairy

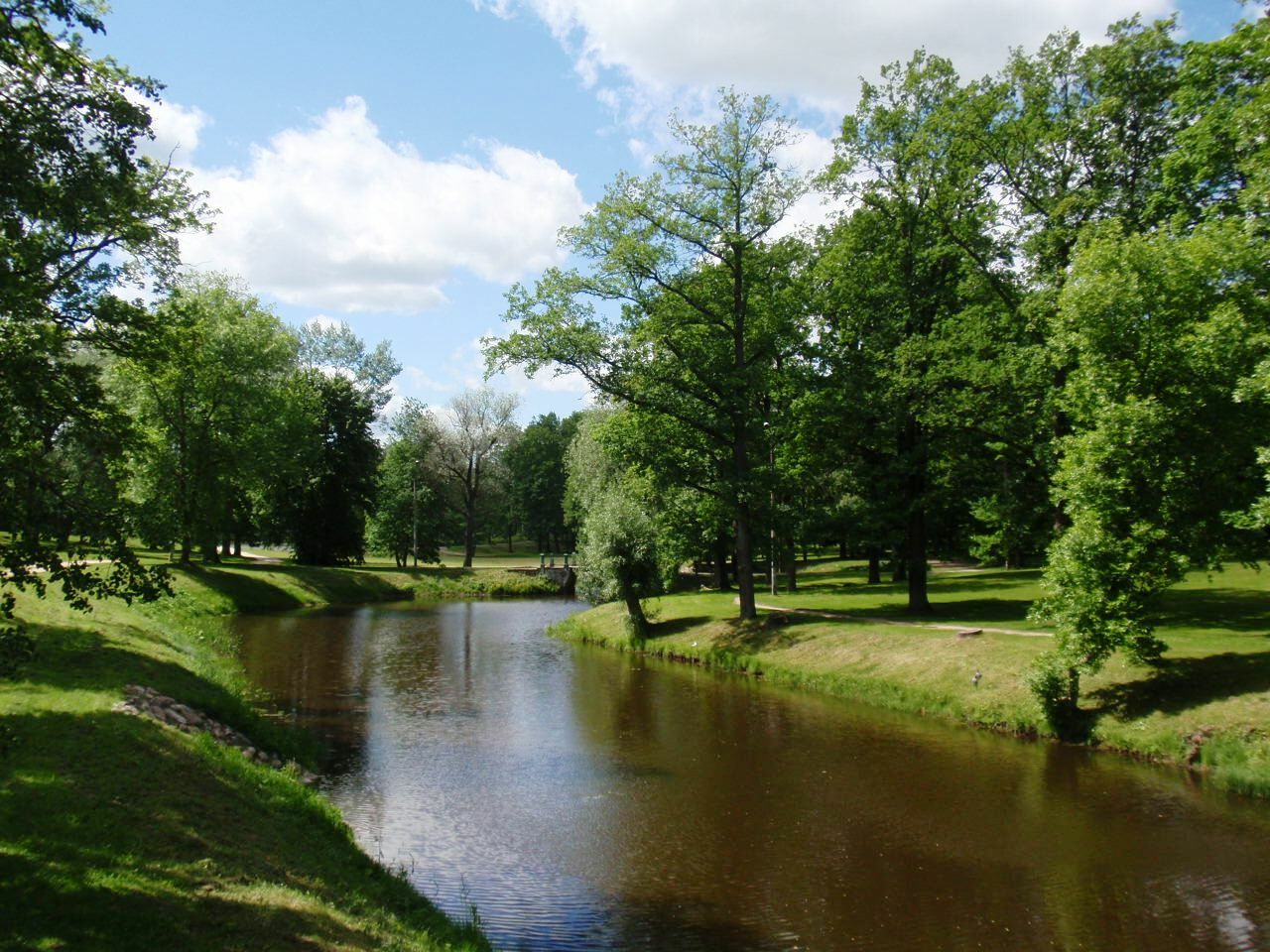
Valga town park

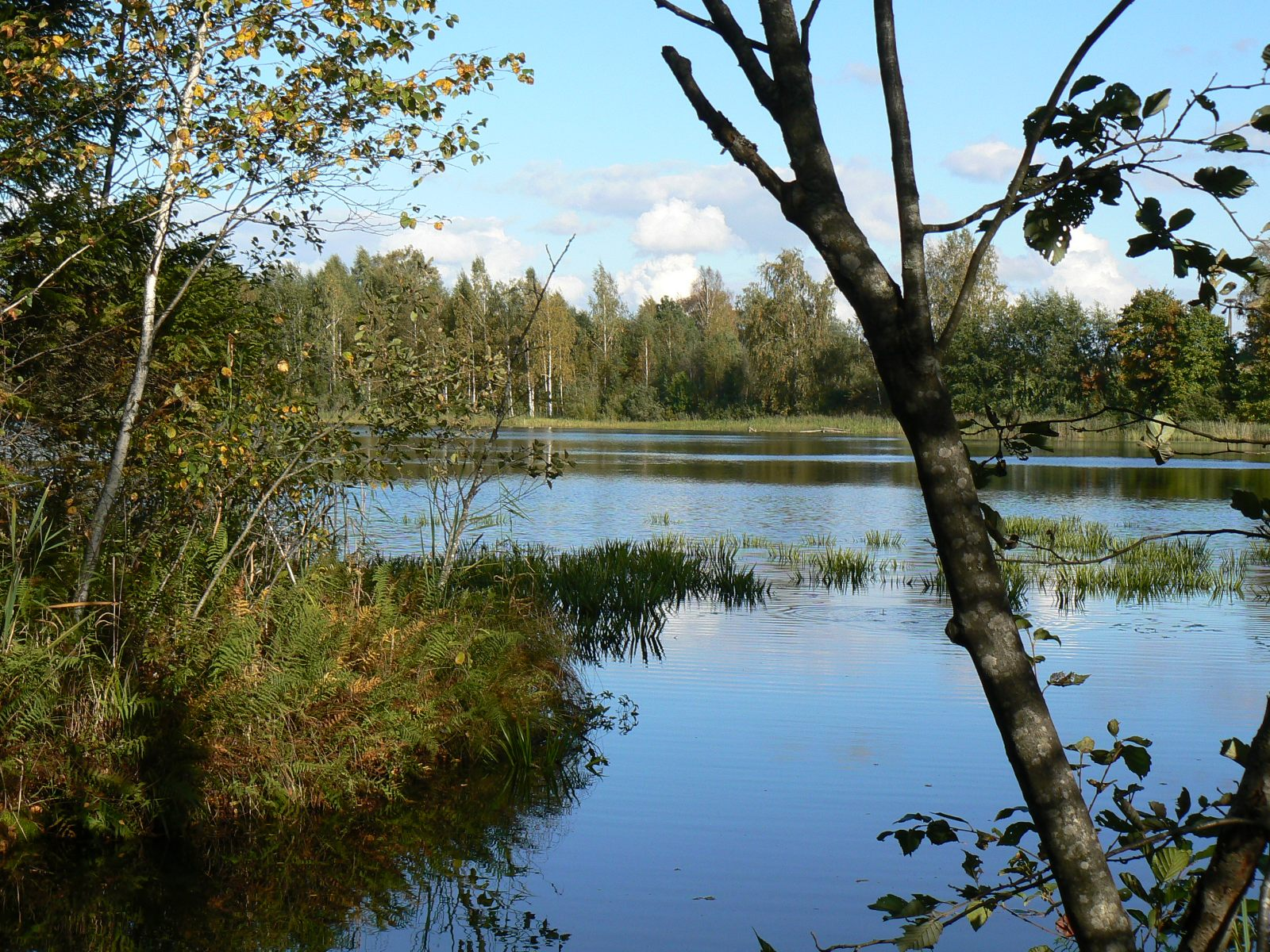
Päidla lake

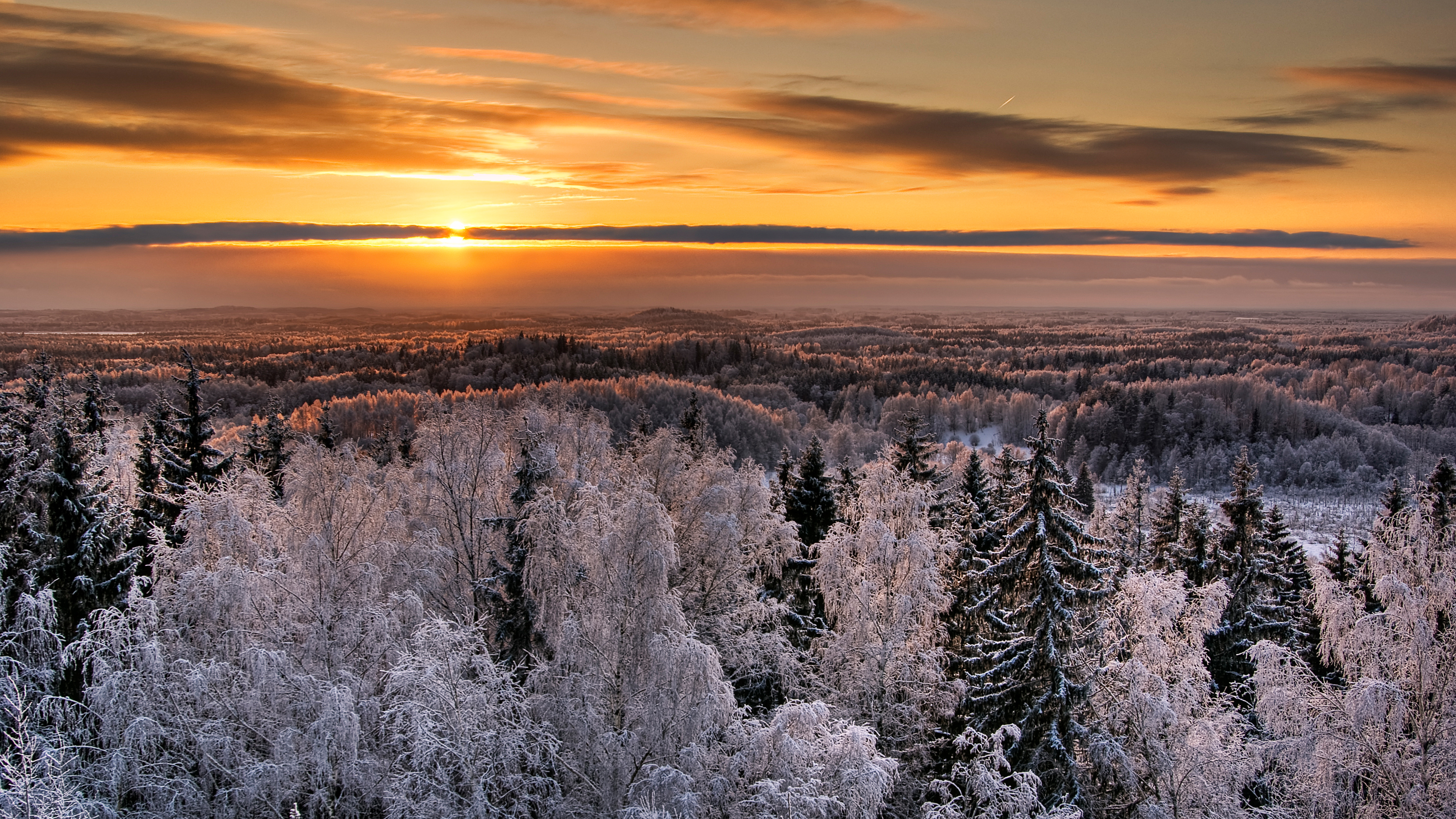
Winter view in Karula
