= Karula Pikkjärv Landscape Conservation Area =

Protected area in Estonia

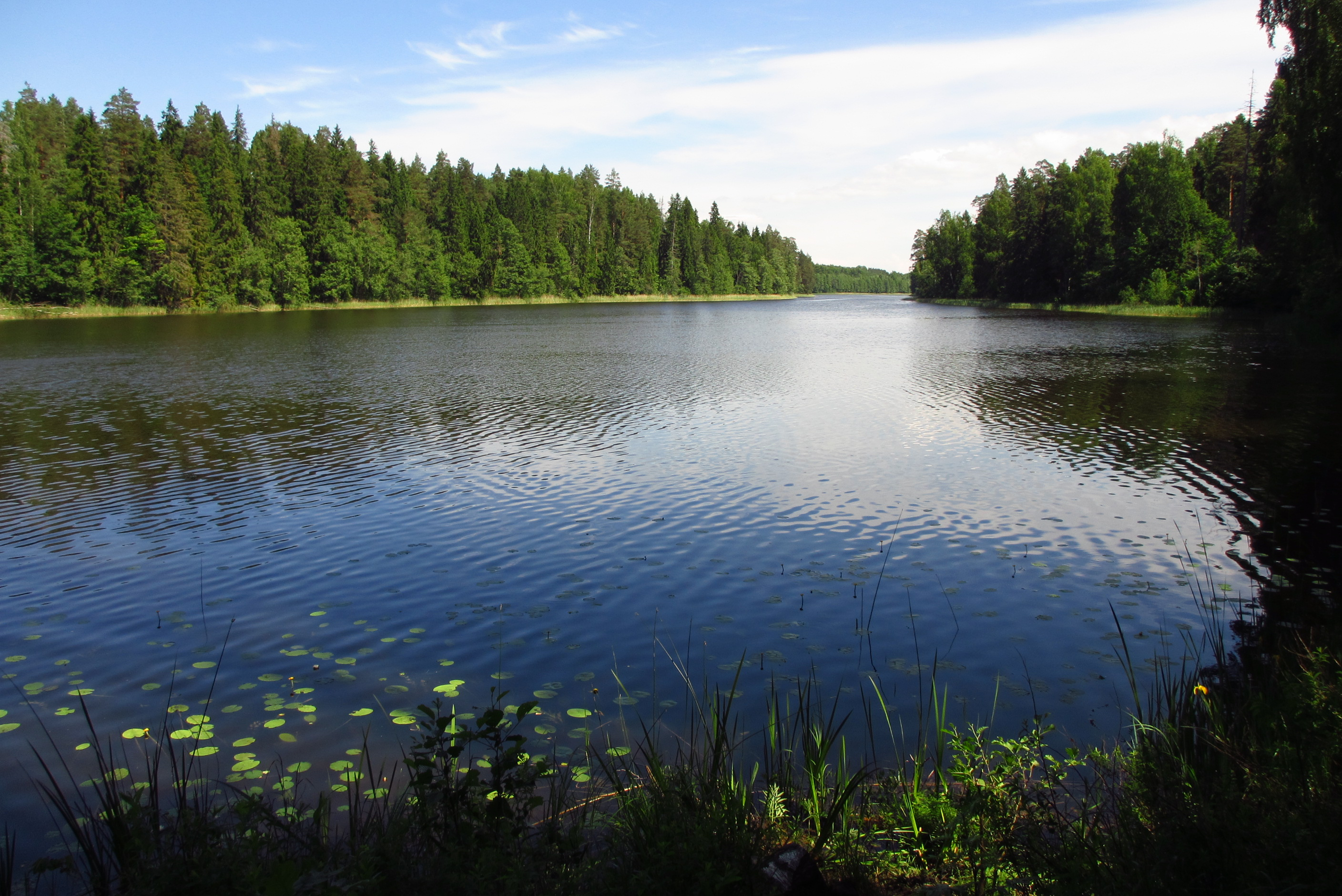

- Location within Estonia
- Location: Estonia
- Coordinates: 57°46′15″N 26°18′00″E
- Area: 364 ha (900 acres)
- Established: 1964 (2015)

Karula Pikkjärv Landscape Conservation Area (Estonian: Karula Pikkjärve maastikukaitseala) is a nature park in Valga County, Estonia.

Its area is 364 ha.

In 1959, the Karula Pikkjärv was taken under protection. In 1964, the protected area (Karula Pikkjärv plus its surrounding areas) was established.
