= Erumägi Landscape Conservation Area =

Protected area in Estonia

- Location within Estonia
- Location: Estonia
- Coordinates: 58°17′00″N 26°19′30″E
- Area: 40 ha (99 acres)
- Established: 2015

Erumägi Landscape Conservation Area (Estonian: Erumäe maastikukaitseala) is a nature park in Tartu County, Estonia.

Its area is 40 ha.

The protected area was designated in 2015 to protect Maiorg ancient valley and its biodiversity.
