= Riidaja Nature Reserve =

Protected area in Estonia

- Location within Estonia
- Location: Estonia
- Coordinates: 58°06′10″N 25°54′20″E
- Area: 13 ha (32 acres)
- Established: 2013

Riidaja Nature Reserve is a nature reserve which is located in Valga County, Estonia.

The area of the nature reserve is 13 ha.

The protected area was founded in 2013 to protect valuable habitat types and threatened species in Riidaja village (former Põdrala Parish).
