= Jõku =

River in Estonia

Jõku River

Location
- Country: Estonia

Physical characteristics
- Mouth: Õhne
  - location: North of Rulli
  - coordinates: 58°03′08″N 25°58′22″E
- Length: 33 km
- Basin size: 83.3 km^{2}

The Jõku River is a river in Estonia in Tõrva Parish, Valga County. The river is 33 km long and its basin size is 83.3 km^{2}. It runs from Virtsjärv into the Õhne River.

The Nähri caves (Estonian: Nähri koopad) are located along the river.
