= List of caves of Estonia =

This is a list of caves located in Estonia.

Name	Image	Notes	Length	Coordinates
Aruküla caves		Aruküla caves is located in Tartu.		
Helme Caves	Helme caves (July 2007)	Helme caves is located in Helme, Tõrva Parish, Valga County		
Koorküla Caves		Koorküla caves is located in Koorküla, Tõrva Parish, Valga County		
Kurisu Sinkhole (Kurisu Cave)		Located in Kurisu, Hiiu County		
Tori Hell Cave		Located in Tori, Pärnu County		
