= Meegaste =

Village in Estonia

- Village
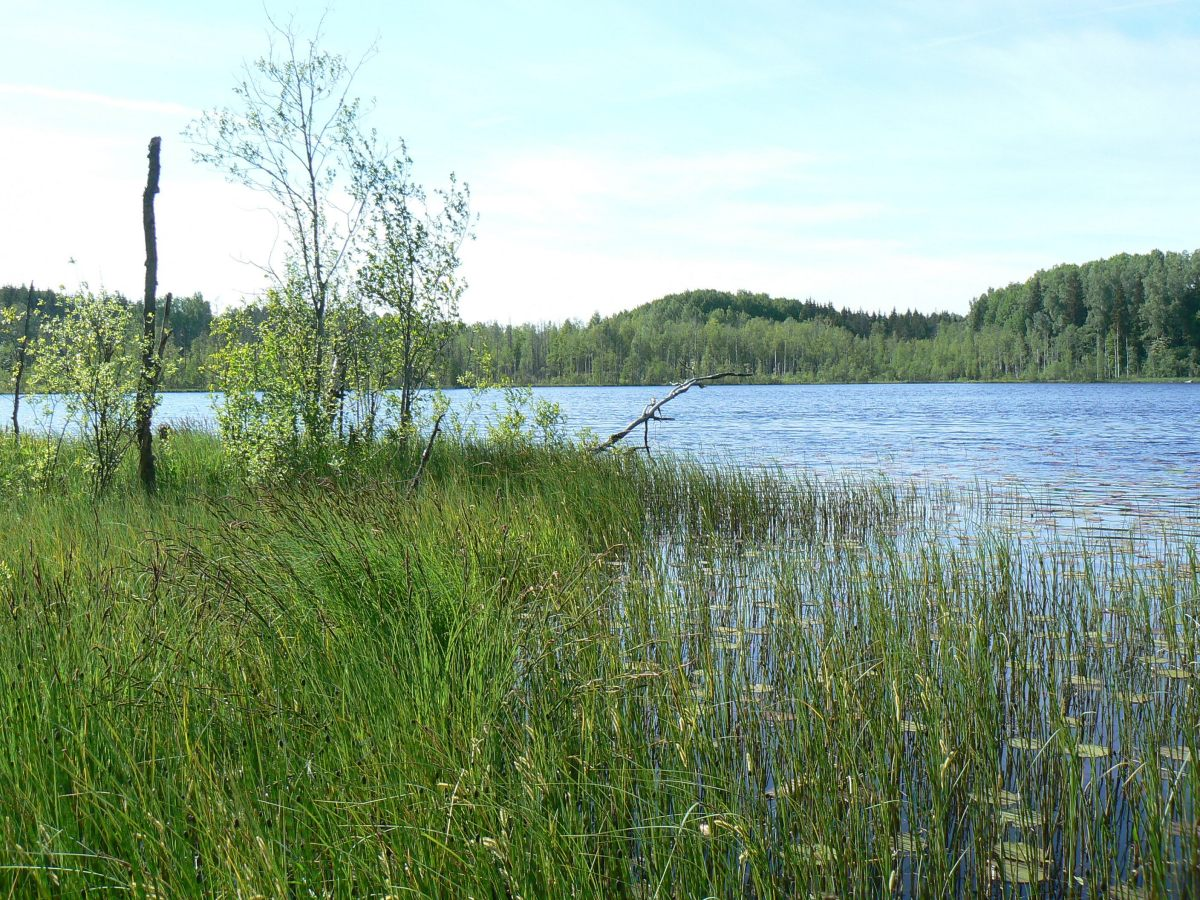
- Päästjärv (also known as Perajärv), a lake in Meegaste

- Location within Estonia
- Coordinates: 58.0522°N 26.3136°E
- Country: Estonia
- County: Valga County
- Parish: Otepää Parish
- Time zone: UTC+2 (EET)
  - Summer (DST): UTC+3 (EEST)

Meegaste is a village in Otepää Parish, Valga County in Estonia.
