= Pühajärve Parish =

Former municipality of Estonia

Pühajärve Parish Pühajärve vald
- Former municipality of Estonia
- Interactive map of Pühajärve Parish
- Coordinates: 58.05°N 26.5°E
- Country: Estonia
- Administrative centre: Otepää

Pühajärve Parish (Estonian: Pühajärve vald) was a rural municipality of Estonia, in Valga County. The parish existed until 1950 and was re-established in 1991. In 1999, the parish was merged with Otepää town and the new parish was named Otepää Parish.
