= Valtina =

Village in Estonia

- village
- Location in Estonia
- Coordinates: 57°47′30″N 26°25′18″E
- Country: Estonia
- County: Valga County
- Municipality: Valga Parish

Population (26.05.2004)
  - Total: 33

Valtina is a village in Valga Parish, Valga County, in southeastern Estonia. It has a population of 33 (as of 1 January 2004).

The currently inactive Valga–Pechory railway passes Valtina on its northern side, there's a station named "Tuulemäe".
