= Kaarel Zilmer =

Estonian sport pedagogue and sport personnel

Kaarel Zilmer (born 9 June 1947) is an Estonian sport pedagogue and sport personnel.

He was born in Kaagjärve Rural Municipality, Valga County. In 1968 he graduated from the University of Tartu's Institute of Physical Education.

In youth he focused on cross-country skiing, coached by Erna Abel and Herbert Abel. 1966 he won Estonian junior championships.

1968-1978 he taught skiing sports at the University of Tartu. Since 1978 he taught winter sports at Tallinn Pedagogical Institute.

1995-2001 he was executive secretary of Estonian Ski Association. He has been the representative of Estonian national skiing team at world championships and winter olympic games.

Awards:

- 2013: state sport prize
- 2016: Order of the White Star, IV class
- 2021: National Sports Lifetime Achievement Award (Estonian: riiklik spordi elutööpreemia)
