= Urmi, Estonia =

Village in Estonia

Urmi
- Village
- Location in Estonia
- Coordinates: 58°07′59″N 26°21′38″E
- Country: Estonia
- County: Valga County
- Municipality: Elva Parish

Population (01.01.2011)
  - Total: 60

Urmi is a village in Elva Parish, Valga County in southeastern Estonia. It is located about 10 km (6 mi) northwest of the town of Otepää and about 11 km (7 mi) south of the town of Elva. As of January 2011, Urmi has a population of 60.
