= List of valleys in Estonia =

This is a list of valleys in Estonia.

Name	Location (county, parish)	Further info	Image
Hundikuristik	Harju County, Tallinn		
Kütiorg	Võru County, Võru Parish		
Maiorg	Tartu County, Elva Parish		
Valley of Tikste (Estonian: Tikse ürgorg)	Valga County, Tõrva Parish		
Tilleorg Valley	Põlva County, Põlva Parish		
Ööbikuorg	Võru County, Rõuge Parish		
