= Koiva-Mustjõe Landscape Conservation Area =

Protected area in Estonia

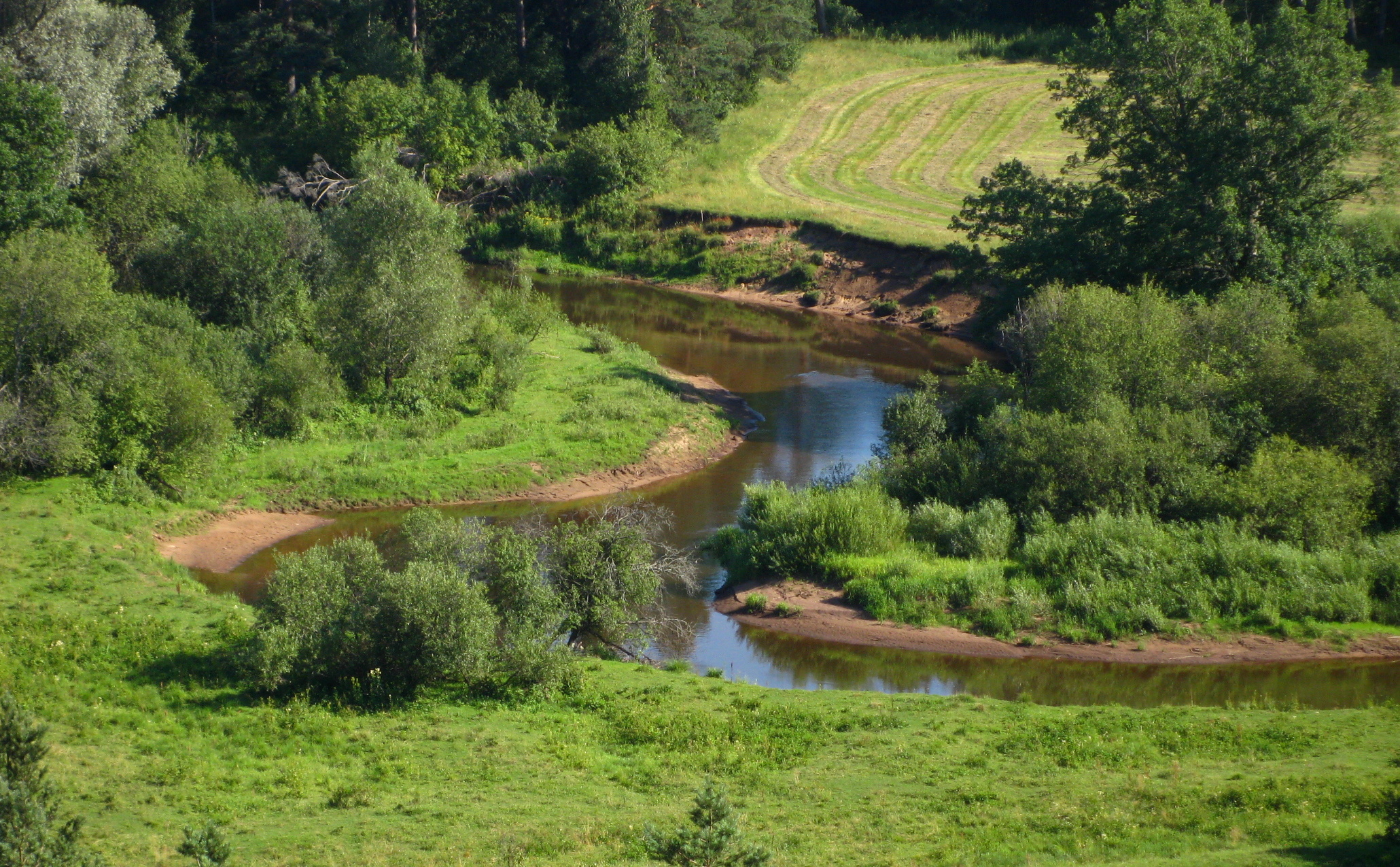

- Location within Estonia
- Location: Estonia
- Coordinates: 57°35′50″N 26°27′30″E
- Area: 3,196 ha (7,900 acres)
- Established: 1957 (2016)

Koiva-Mustjõe Landscape Conservation Area is a nature park situated in Võru County, Estonia.

Its area is 3196 ha.

The protected area was designated in 1957 to protect Koiva wooded meadow and its surrounding areas.
