= Pedaste =

Village in Estonia

- Village
- Location within Estonia
- Coordinates: 58.1042°N 26.2489°E
- Country: Estonia
- County: Tartu County
- Parish: Elva Parish
- Time zone: UTC+2 (EET)
  - Summer (DST): UTC+3 (EEST)

Pedaste is a village in Elva Parish, Tartu County in Estonia.
