= Pühaste =

Village in Estonia

- Village
- Location within Estonia
- Coordinates: 58.1097°N 26.1292°E
- Country: Estonia
- County: Tartu County
- Parish: Elva Parish
- Time zone: UTC+2 (EET)
  - Summer (DST): UTC+3 (EEST)

Pühaste is a village in Elva Parish, Tartu County in Estonia.
