= Palupera Parish =

Former municipality of Estonia

Coordinates: 58°07′09″N 26°20′40″E

Palupera Parish Palupera vald
- Municipality of Estonia
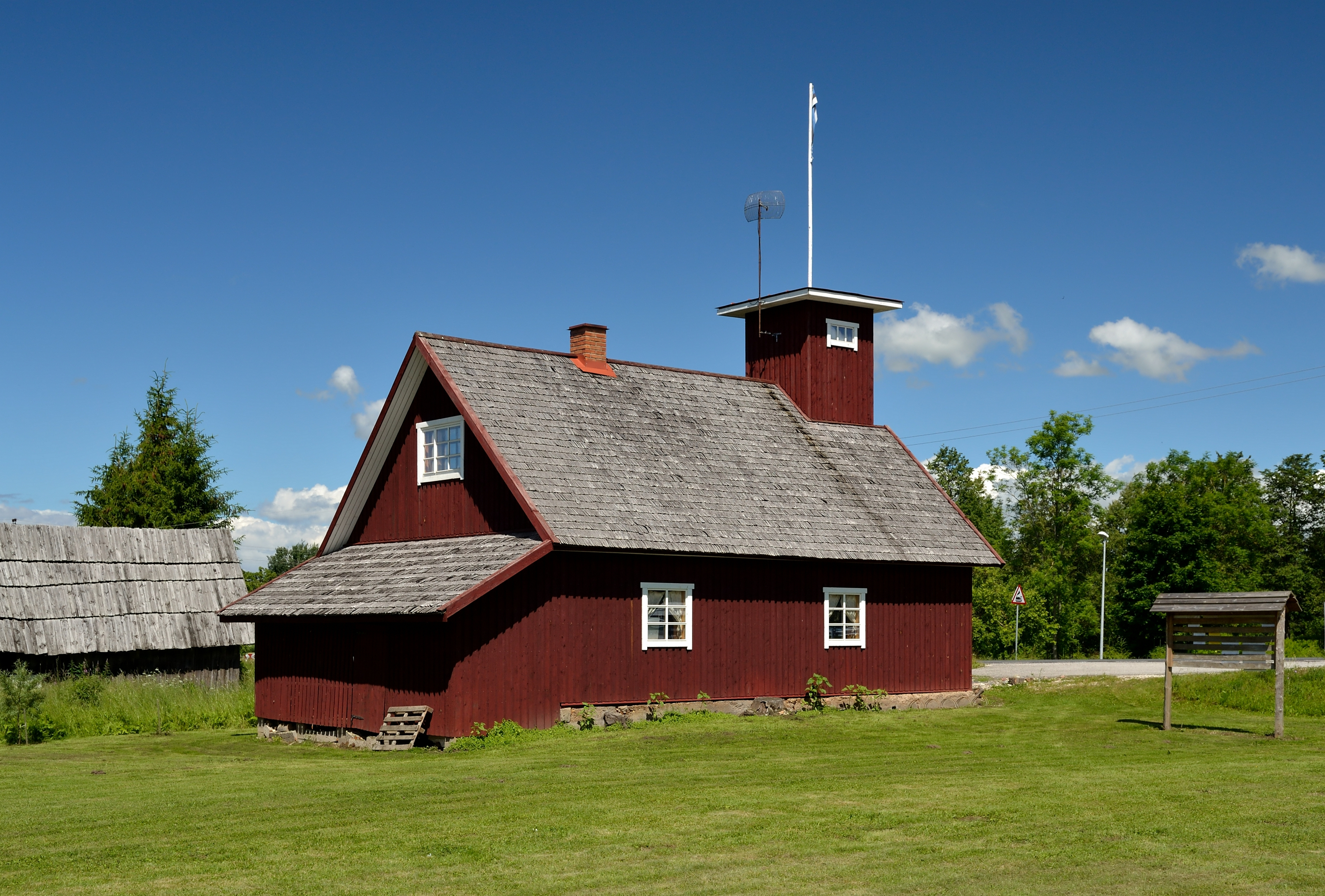
- Former fire shed in Palupera village

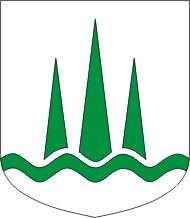
- Flag Coat of arms

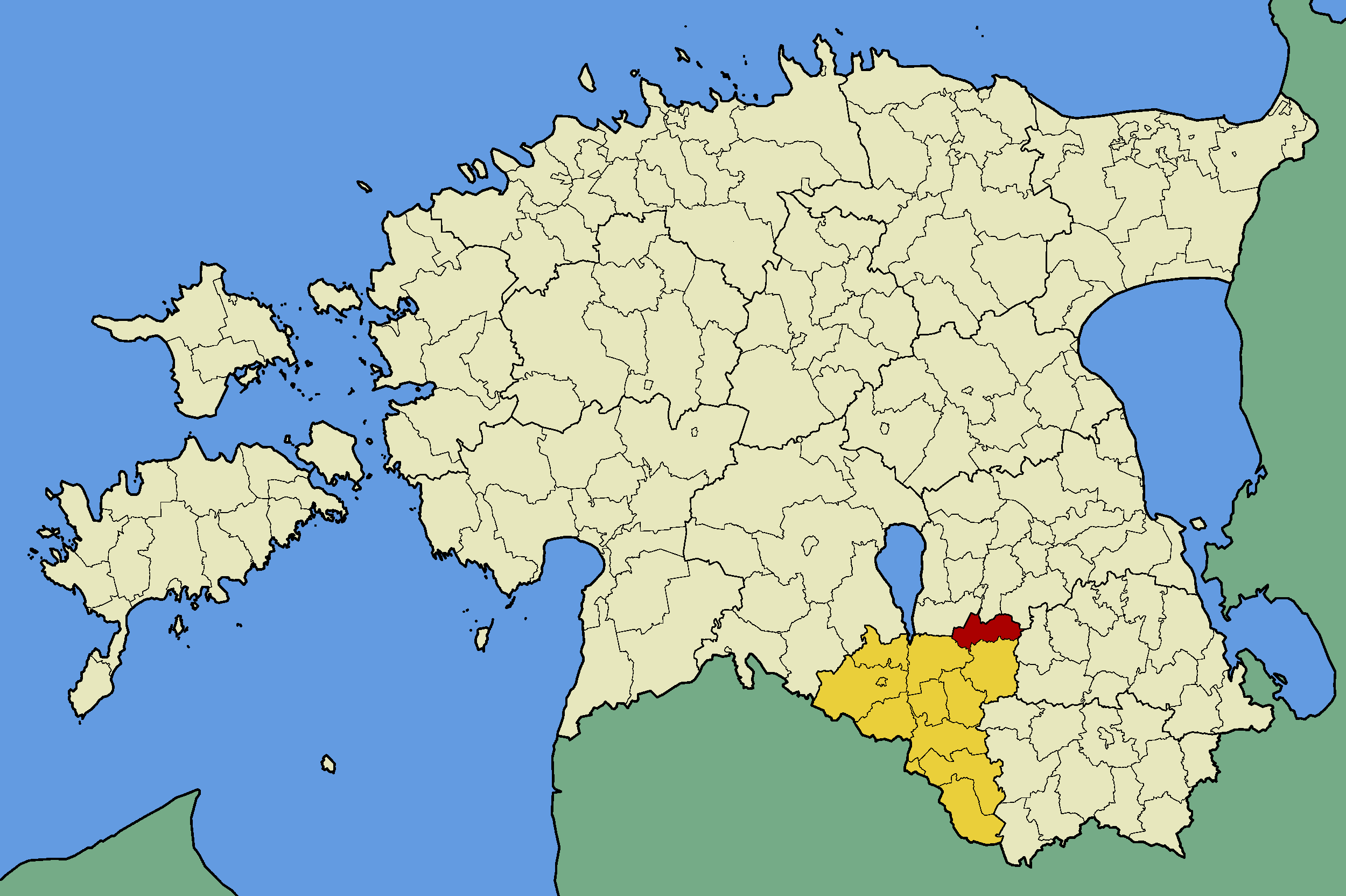
- Palupera Parish within Valga County.
- Country: Estonia
- County: Valga County
- Administrative centre: Hellenurme

Area
  - Total: 123.62 km^{2} (47.73 sq mi)

Population (01.09.2009)
  - Total: 1,151
  - Density: 9.311/km^{2} (24.11/sq mi)
- Website: www.palupera.ee

Palupera Parish was a rural municipality of the Estonian county of Valga.

Palupera Parish ceased to exist when it was divided between Otepää and Elva parishes during the administrative reform in Estonia in 2017.

== Settlements ==
Villages

Astuvere - Atra - Hellenurme - Lutike - Mäelooga - Makita - Miti - Neeruti - Nõuni - Päidla - Palupera - Räbi - Pastaku - Urmi
