= Juhan Kukk's cabinet =

Government of Estonia from 1922 to 1923

Juhan Kukk's cabinet was in office in Estonia from 21 November 1922 to 2 August 1923, when it was succeeded by Konstantin Päts' second cabinet.

== Members ==
This cabinet's members were the following:

Name	Portrait	Position
Juhan Kukk	Juhan_kukk	Prime Minister
Karl Einbund		Minister of the Interior
Aleksander Hellat	Aleksander-hellat	Minister of Foreign Affairs
Georg Vestel		Minister of Finance; Minister of Commerce and Industry
Bernhard Rostfeld		Minister of Agricultural Affairs
Karl Ipsberg		Minister of Roads
Jaak Reichmann		Minister of Justice
Christjan Kaarna		Minister of Labor and Welfare
Aleksander Veidermann		Minister of Education
Jaan Soots	Jaan_Soots	Minister of War
