= Konstantin Päts's first cabinet =

Government of Estonia from 1921 to 1922

Konstantin Päts's first cabinet was in office in Estonia from 25 January 1921 to 21 November 1922, when it was succeeded by Juhan Kukk's cabinet.

== Members ==
This cabinet's members were the following:

Name	Portrait	Position
Konstantin Päts		Prime Minister
Karl Einbund		Minister of the Interior
Ants Piip		Minister of Foreign Affairs
Georg Vestel		Minister of Finance
Juhan Kukk		Minister of Commerce and Industry
Jaan Soots		Minister of War
Bernhard Rostfeld		Minister of Agricultural Affairs
Karl Ipsberg		Minister of Roads
Jaak Reichmann		Minister of Justice
Heinrich Bauer		Minister of Education
Christjan Kaarna		Minister of Labor and Welfare
