= Konstantin Päts's second cabinet =

Government of Estonia from 1923 to 1924

Konstantin Päts's second cabinet was in office in Estonia from 2 August 1923 to 26 March 1924, when it was succeeded by Friedrich Akel's cabinet.

== Members ==
This cabinet's members were the following:

Name	Portrait	Position
Konstantin Päts		Prime Minister
Karl Einbund		Minister of the Interior
Friedrich Karl Akel		Minister of Foreign Affairs
Georg Vestel		Minister of Finance
August Kerem		Minister of Agricultural Affairs
Karl Ipsberg		Minister of Roads
Rudolf Gabrel		Minister of Justice
Aleksander Veidermann		Minister of Education
