= Mäelooga =

Village in Estonia

- village
- Location in Estonia
- Coordinates: 58°08′48″N 26°23′52″E
- Country: Estonia
- County: Valga County
- Municipality: Elva Parish

Population (01.01.2011)
  - Total: 48

Mäelooga is a village in Elva Parish, Valga County, in southeastern Estonia. It is located just northeast of Hellenurme, former administrative centre of the municipality. The town of Elva is located about 8 km (5 mi) north. Mäelooga has a population of 48 (as of 1 January 2011).
