= Pastaku =

Village in Estonia

- village
- Location in Estonia
- Coordinates: 58°09′33″N 26°22′38″E
- Country: Estonia
- County: Valga County
- Municipality: Elva Parish

Population (01.01.2011)
  - Total: 45

Pastaku is a village in Elva Parish, Valga County in southeastern Estonia. It is located just north of Hellenurme, the administrative centre of the municipality; the town of Elva is located about 8 km (5 mi) north of Hellenurme. Pastaku has a population of 45 (as of 1 January 2011).

The Tartu–Valga railway passes Pastaku on its western side, but there is no station. The nearest station is located about 4 km southwest in Palupera village.
