= Leida (given name) =

Female given name

- Gender: Female
- Language: Estonian
- Name day: 27 March

Origin
- Region of origin: Estonia

Other names
- Related names: Laide, Laidi, Leia, Leidi

Leida is a predominantly Estonian feminine given name.

As of 1 January 2021, 1,050 women in Estonia have the first name Leida, making it the 176th most popular female name in the country. The name is most common in the 80+ age group, and most commonly found in Viljandi County, where 19.59 per 10,000 inhabitants of the county bear the name.

Individuals bearing the name Leida include:

- Leida Aru (1917–1999), Estonian actress and director
- Leida Kibuvits (1907–1976), Estonian writer
- Leida Kook (1912–2015), Estonian physician and professor
- Leida Laius (1923–1996), Estonian film director
- Leida Leivategija (1918–2004), Estonian entomologist and agricultural scientist
- Leida Loone (1911–1969), Estonian historian and translator
- Leida Peips (born 1937), Estonian and Soviet politician
- Leida Rammo (1924–2020), Estonian actress
- Leida Soom (1912–2009), Estonian opera singer, textile and ex-libris artist
- Leida Tigane (1908–1983), Estonian children's writer and prose writer
- Leida Tuulmets (1933–2021), Estonian mathematician
