= Jaan Teemant's first cabinet =

Government of Estonia from 1925 to 1926

- 14th Cabinet of Estonia
- Date formed: 15 December 1925
- Date dissolved: 23 July 1926

People and organisations
- Head of state: Jaan Teemant (as State Elder)
- Head of government: Jaan Teemant
- Member party: Farmers' Assemblies; Estonian Labour Party; Estonian People's Party; Christian People's Party; Settlers' Party
- Status in legislature: II Riigikogu (until 14 June 1926); III Riigikogu (from 15 June 1926)

History
- Predecessor: Jüri Jaakson's cabinet
- Successor: Jaan Teemant's second cabinet

Jaan Teemant's first cabinet was the 14th Government of Estonia, serving in office from 15 December 1925 to 23 July 1926. Led by State Elder Jaan Teemant of the Farmers' Assemblies, the coalition government succeeded Jüri Jaakson's cabinet and remained in power for 221 days.

== History ==
Following the resignation of Jüri Jaakson's broad coalition government in December 1925, the II Riigikogu appointed Jaan Teemant to form a new cabinet. Teemant assembled a centre-right coalition consisting of the Farmers' Assemblies, the Estonian Labour Party, the Estonian People's Party, the Christian People's Party, and the Settlers' Party.

During its term, the cabinet oversaw the 1926 Estonian parliamentary election, held from 15 to 17 May 1926. Additionally, on 18 June 1926, the government narrowed the territorial scope of the martial law (sõjaseisukord) that had been expanded nationwide following the December 1924 Communist coup attempt, restricting it back to its pre-December 1924 boundaries. Following the convening of the newly elected III Riigikogu, the cabinet resigned as a matter of constitutional custom on 23 July 1926 and was succeeded by Jaan Teemant's second cabinet.

== Cabinet members ==
The cabinet consisted of the following ministers:

Portfolio	Minister	Took office	Left office	Party
State Elder	Jaan Teemant	15 December 1925	23 July 1926	Farmers' Assemblies
Minister of Foreign Affairs	Ants Piip	15 December 1925	23 July 1926	Estonian Labour Party
Minister of the Interior	Karl Einbund	15 December 1925	23 July 1926	Estonian People's Party
Minister of Agricultural Affairs	Heinrich Laretei	15 December 1925	23 July 1926	Settlers' Party
Minister of Education	Jaan Lattik	15 December 1925	23 July 1926	Christian People's Party
Minister of Labour and Welfare	Christian Kaarna	15 December 1925	23 July 1926	Estonian Labour Party
Minister of Justice	Tõnis Kalbus	15 December 1925	23 July 1926	Estonian Labour Party
Minister of Finance	Leo Sepp	15 December 1925	23 July 1926	Independent
Minister of War	Jaan Soots	15 December 1925	23 July 1926	Farmers' Assemblies
Minister of Roads	Oskar Amberg	15 December 1925	23 July 1926	Christian People's Party
Minister of Trade and Industry	Ernst Constantin Weberman	12 January 1926	23 July 1926	Independent
