= Friedrich Akel's cabinet =

Government of Estonia from March 1924 to December 1924

Friedrich Akel's cabinet held office in Estonia from March 26, 1924, to December 16, 1924, when it was succeeded by Jüri Jaakson's cabinet.

== Members ==
This cabinet's members were the following:

Name	Portrait	Position
Friedrich Akel		Prime Minister
Theodor Rõuk		Minister of the Interior
Otto Strandman		Minister of Foreign Affairs
August Kerem		Minister of Agricultural Affairs
Karl Kark		Minister of Roads
Rudolf Gabrel		Minister of Justice
Hugo-Bernhard Rahamägi		Minister of Education
