= Lutike =

Village in Estonia

- village
- Location in Estonia
- Coordinates: 58°08′30″N 26°33′49″E
- Country: Estonia
- County: Valga County
- Municipality: Otepää Parish

Population (01.01.2011)
  - Total: 27

Lutike is a village in Otepää Parish, Valga County, in southeastern Estonia, about 9 km (6 mi) northeast of the town of Otepää. Lutike has a population of 27 (as of 1 January 2011).

There are several lakes located in the village. One of them is Lake Leigo, where the Leigo Lake Music Festival has been held annually since 1998.

The children's writer Leida Tigane has described the life in the village in the 1920s in her novel Seitse pastlapaari.

== Gallery ==
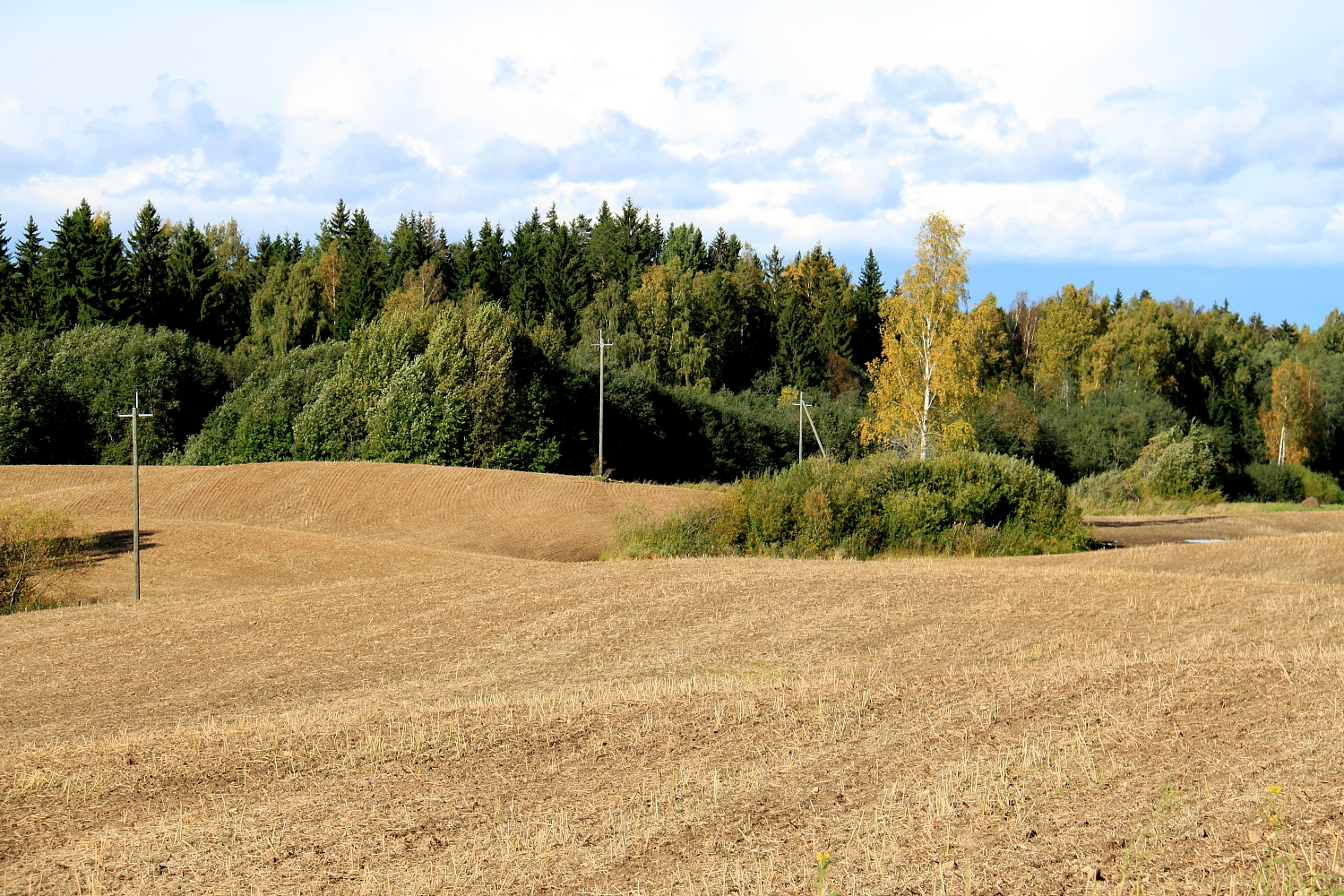
Landscape near Lutike

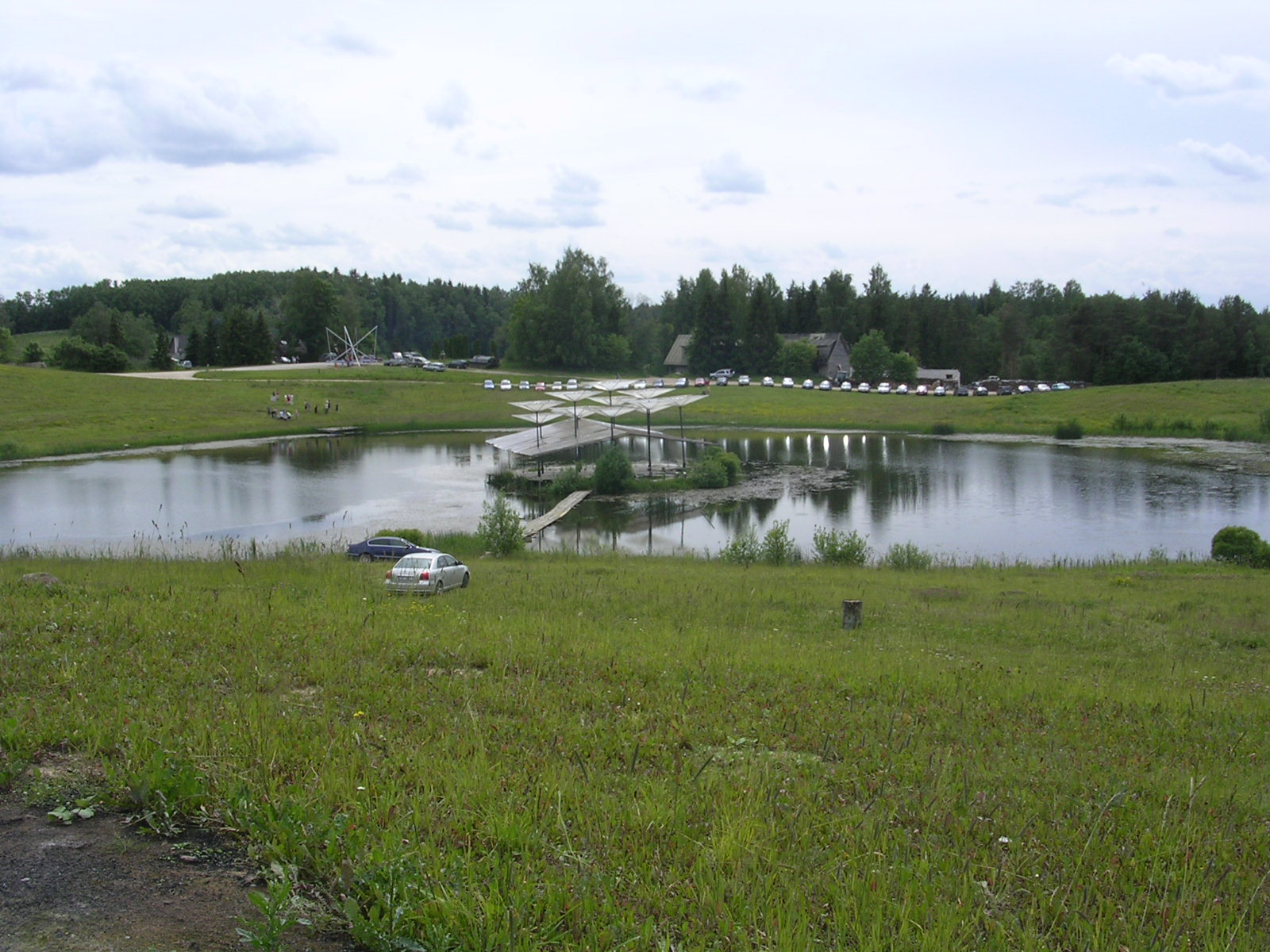
One of several of the Leigo Lakes

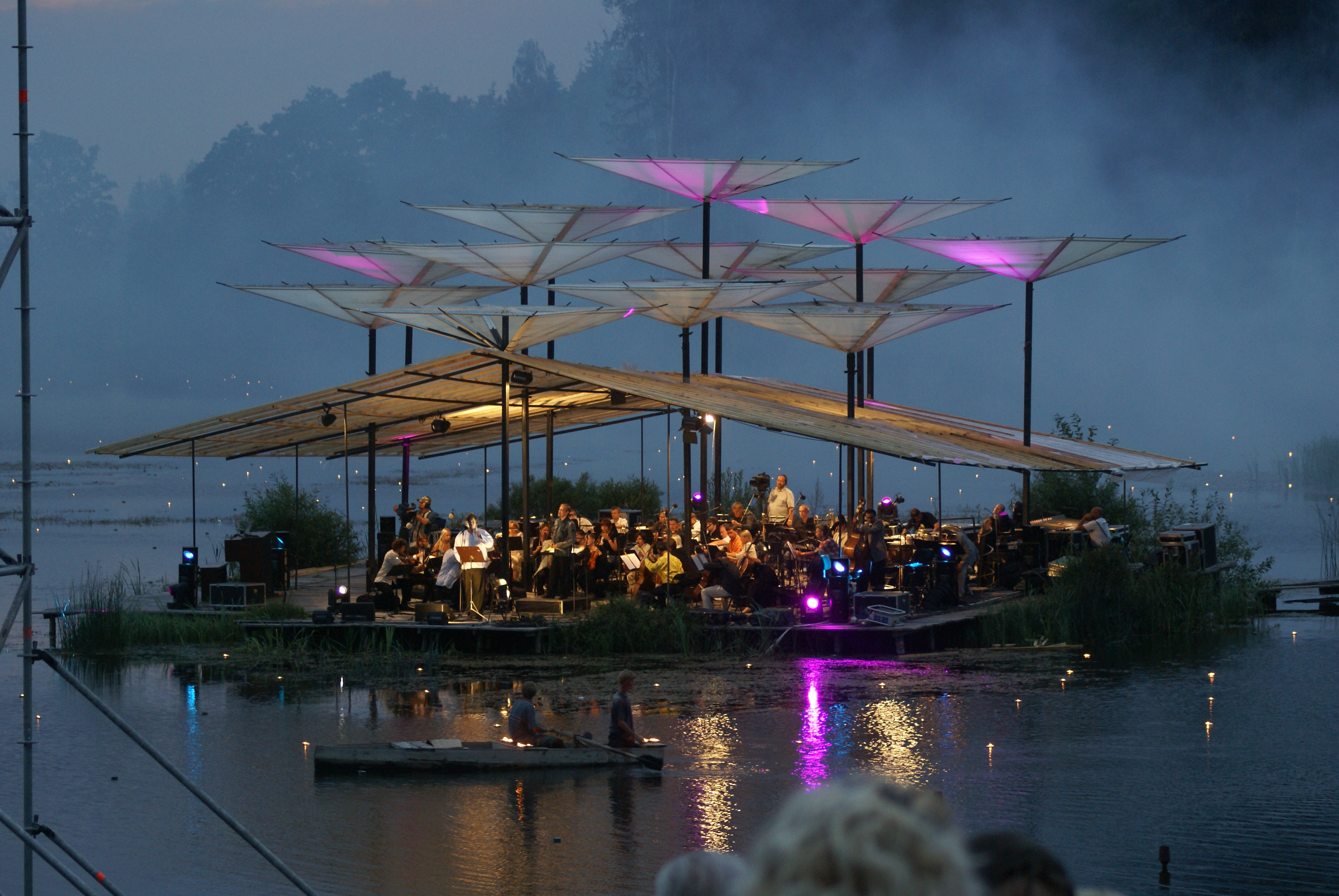
Leigo Lake Music Festival in 2007

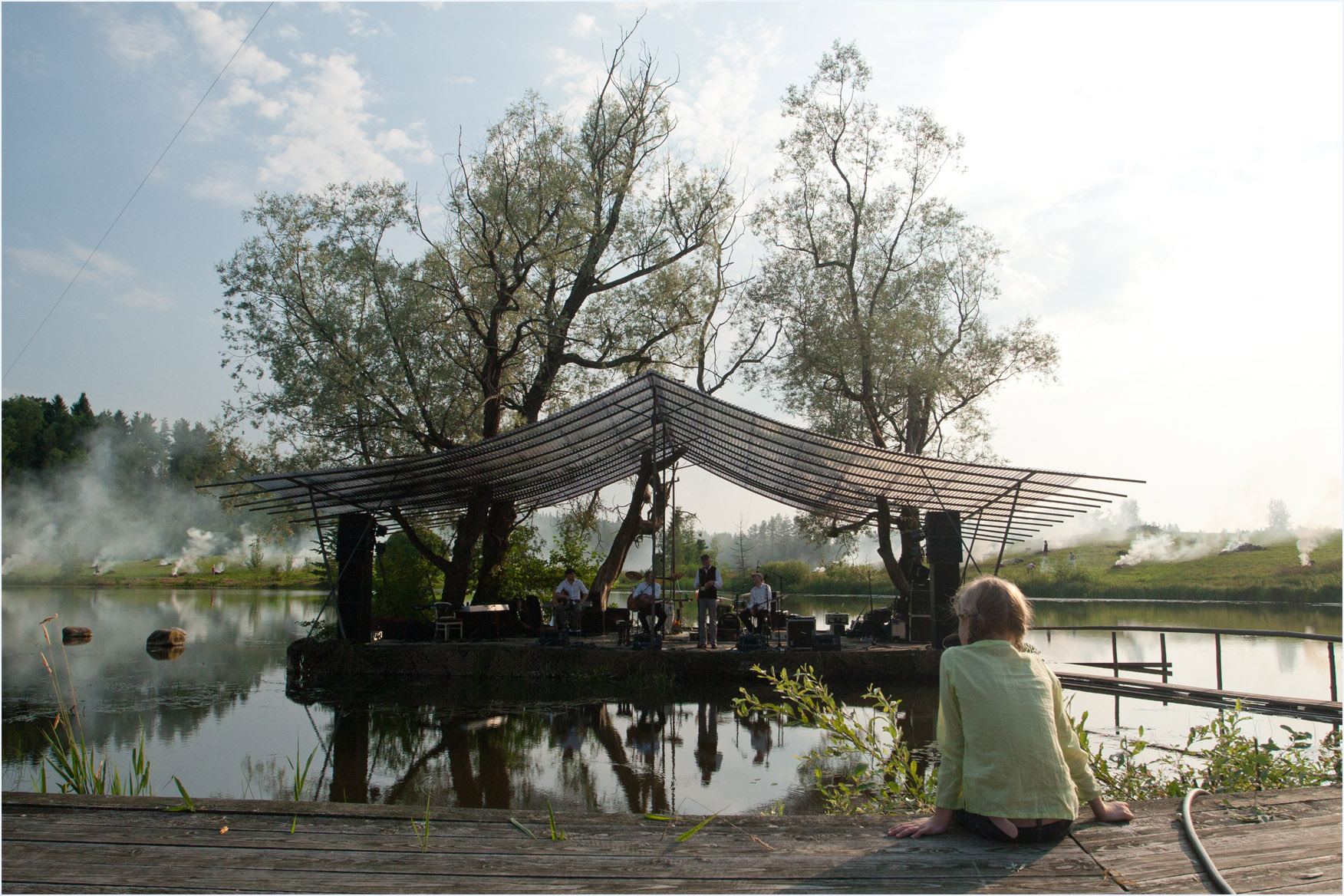
