= Leigo Lake Music Festival =

Music festival held in Estonia

Coordinates: 58°08′30″N 26°33′49″E

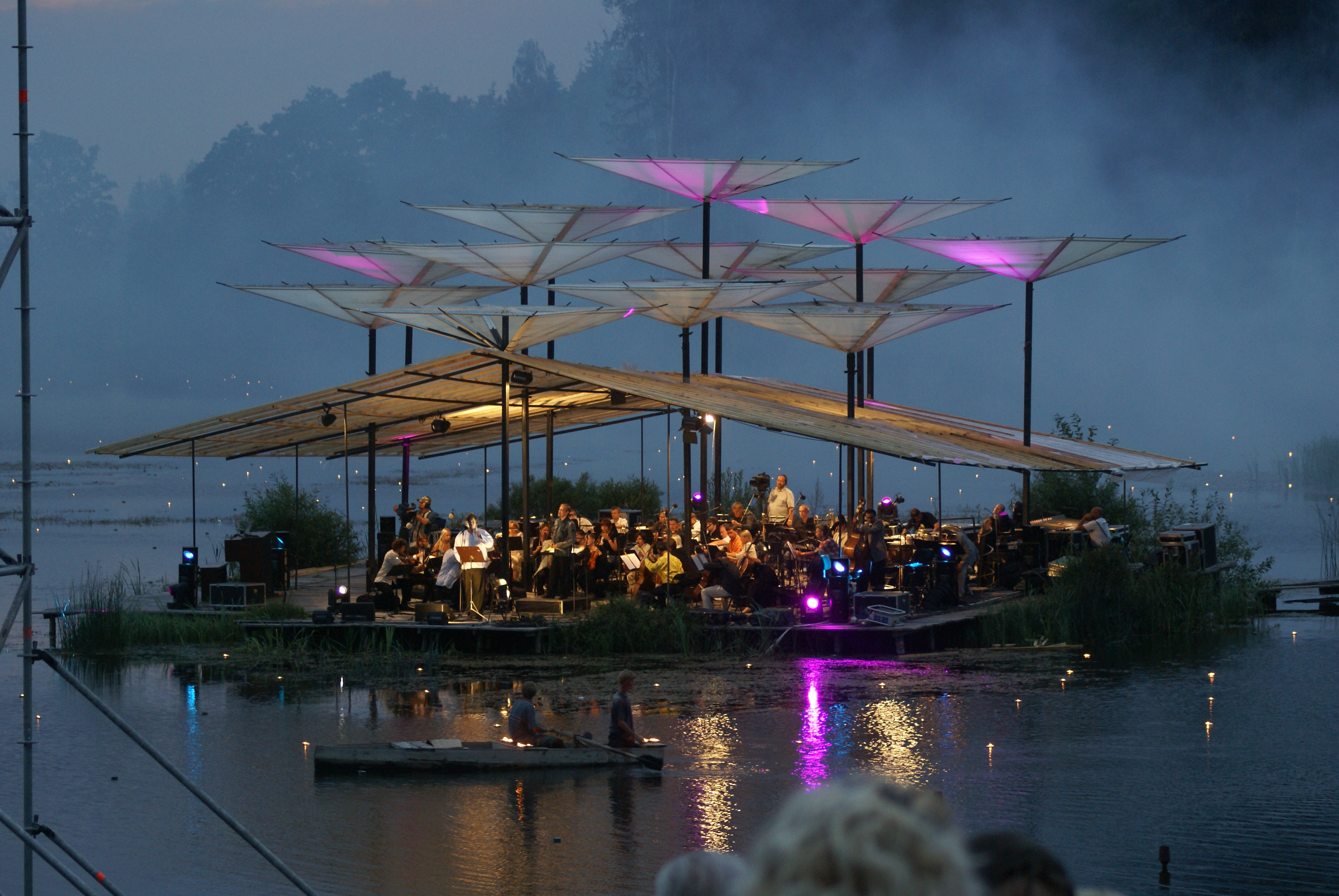
Leigo Lake Music Festival

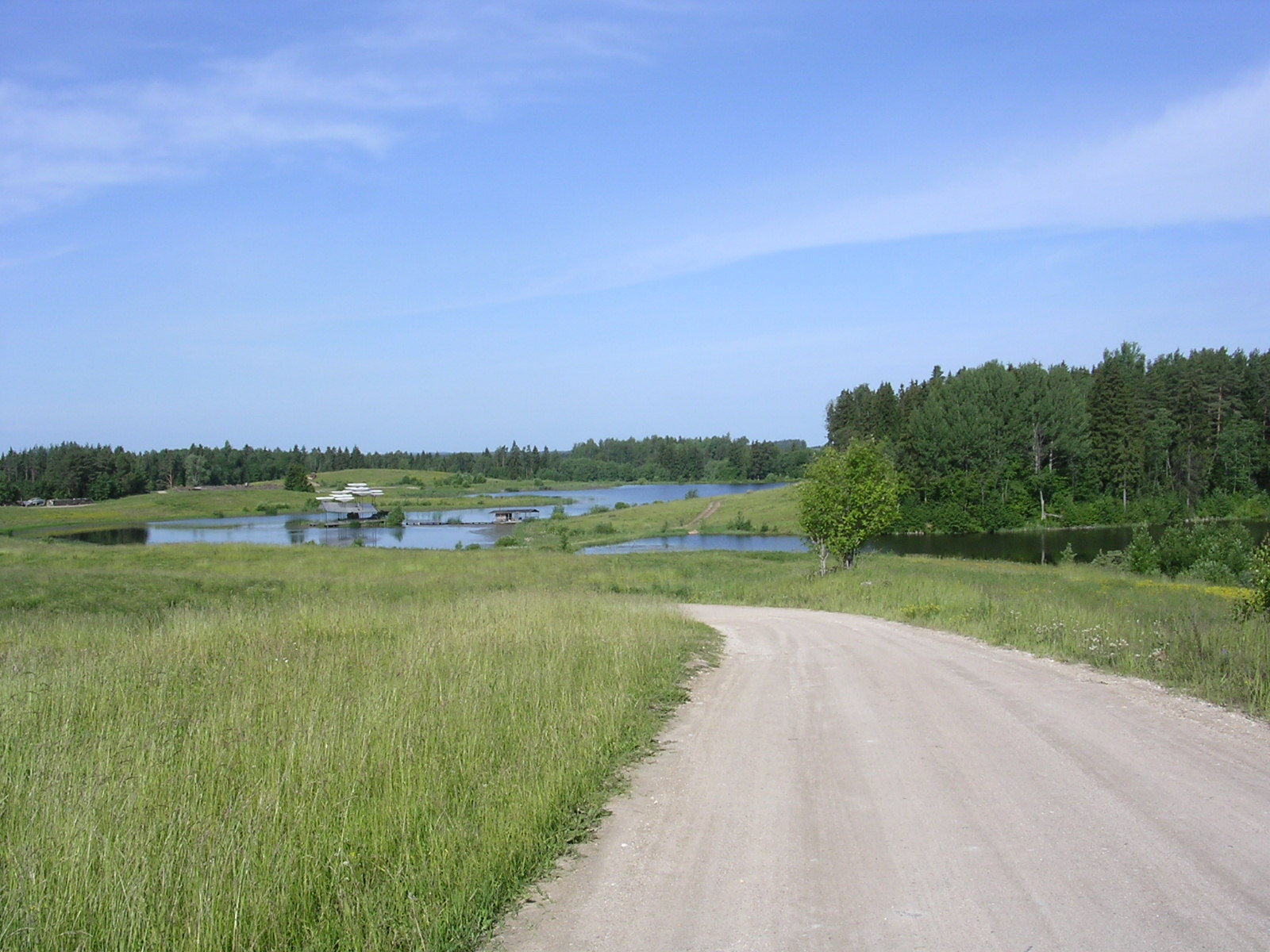
View to Lake Lakes

Leigo Lake Music Festival (Estonian: Leigo Järvemuusika Festival) is an Estonian music festival which is held in Lutike, Valga County. Besides music, light and fire performances are shown. The festival is named after Leigo Tourism Farm.

Near the festival are located Leigo Lakes and these lakes are essential components of festival's light and fire performances.

First festival took place in 1998. The festival's key person is Tõnu Tamm.

Since 2015, the festival focuses on classical music.
