= Christian Kaarna =

Estonian politician (1882–1943)

Christian Jaan Kaarna (also Christjan Kaarna and Kristjan Kaarna; 20 October 1882 – 1 January 1943) was an Estonian journalist, banker, and politician.

Kaarna was born in Artra, Palupera Parish, Kreis Dorpat (now Elva Parish) to farmers Jaan and Liisa Kaarna (née Tullino). He studied at Kirepi Primary School and Kavilda Parish School. He graduated from the Teachers' Seminary of the University of Tartu. Between 1904 and 1905, he worked in Kodijärve Parish as a parish clerk. In 1905, he worked for the Tartu newspaper Vabadus. In 1906, he worked for the Tallinn newspapers Sõnumed and Virulane. From 1909 until 1916, he was the editor of the Narva newspaper Meie Elu. From 1916 until 1917, he served in the Imperial Russian Army.

Between 1918 and 1920, Kaarna was Commissar of the Estonian Provisional Government in Narva and Virumaa. He was Minister of Labor and Welfare in Konstantin Päts' first cabinet (from 16 December 1921 until 20 October 1922) and Juhan Kukk's cabinet (21 November 1922 to 2 August 1923), and again from 1924 to 1926 in Friedrich Akel's cabinet, in the government of Jüri Jaakson, and in the first government of Jaan Teemant. In addition, he was a member of the Riigikogu from 1920 until 1929 in the I, II, and III Riigikogu, representing the Estonian Labour Party; Ernst Raatma succeeded him after he left.

During the period of 1928 to 1940, he was the director of the Bank of Estonia, as well as serving as a board member of several other several banks, such as the National Mortgage Bank of Estonia. He was the chairman of several organizations, such as the Narva Estonian Society, one of the founders and chairman of the Joala Mutual Credit Union, a member of the board of the Estonia Society, and an assistant chairman of the congregation of the Estonian Evangelical Lutheran Church's Kaarli Church on Toompea.

Following the Soviet occupation of Estonia in 1940, Kaarna was arrested by the NKVD on 18 September 1940 and died in imprisonment in the gulag in Karaganda.

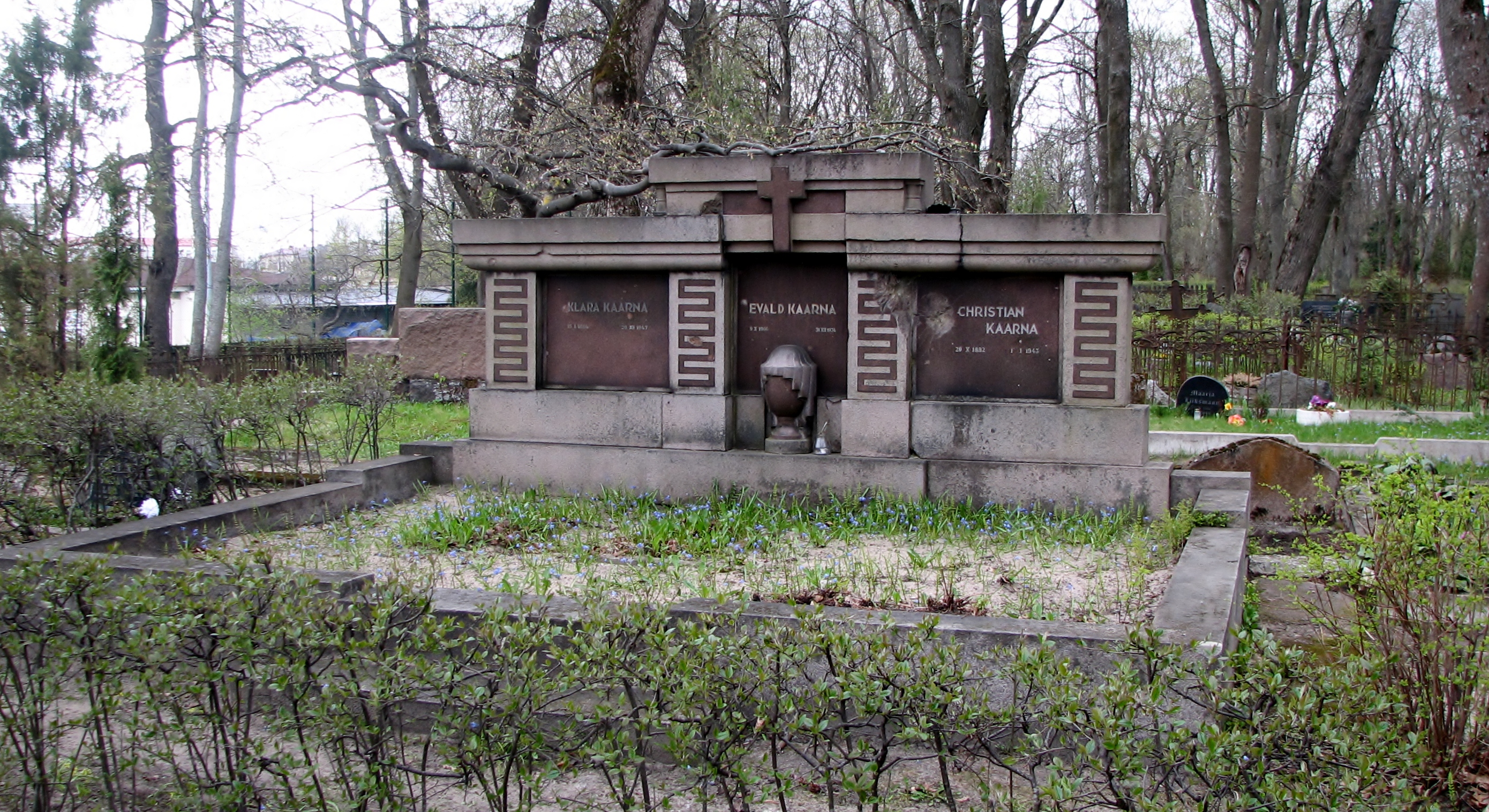
Grave of Kaarna and family at Siselinna Cemetery in Tallinn
