= Astuvere =

Village in Estonia

- village
- Location in Estonia
- Coordinates: 58°05′53″N 26°18′33″E
- Country: Estonia
- County: Valga County
- Municipality: Elva Parish

Population (01.01.2011)
  - Total: 15

Astuvere is a village in Elva Parish, Valga County in southeastern Estonia. It's located about 12 km (7 mi) northwest of the town of Otepää and about 15 km (9 mi) southwest of the town of Elva. Astuvere has a population of 22 (as of 31 December 2011).

The Tartu–Valga railway passes Astuvere, but there's no station. The nearest station is located in the neighbouring Palupera village about 3 km north.
