= Tõnu Tamm =

Estonian biologist

Tõnu Tamm (born in 1941) is an Estonian biologist. He is primarily known as the organizer of the Leigo Lake Music Festival.

In 2001, he was awarded with Order of the White Star, V class.
