= Lake Mõrtsuka =

Lake in Estonia

- Mõrtsuka järv (Estonian)
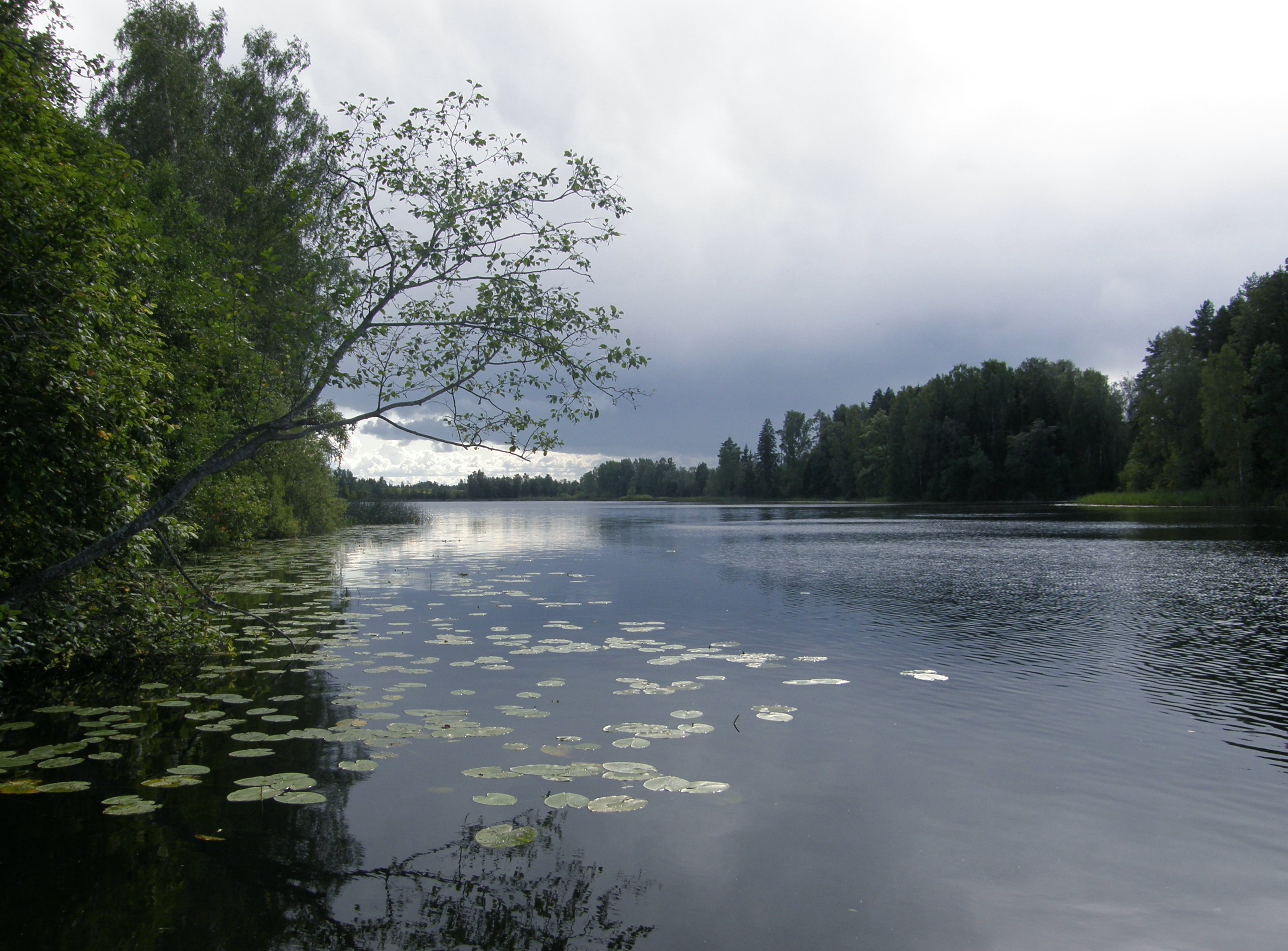

- Location within Estonia
- Coordinates: 58°08′08″N 26°27′58″E
- Basin countries: Estonia
- Max. length: 1,100 meters (3,600 ft)
- Surface area: 24.5 hectares (61 acres)
- Average depth: 3.7 meters (12 ft)
- Max. depth: 6.5 meters (21 ft)
- Shore length^{1}: 3,190 meters (10,470 ft)
- Surface elevation: 97.7 meters (321 ft)
- ^{1} Shore length is not a well-defined measure.

Lake Mõrtsuka (Estonian: Mõrtsuka järv, also Väärsi järv or Mõrtsukjärv) is a lake in Estonia. It is located in the village of Päidla in Otepää Parish, Valga County.

== Physical description ==
The lake has an area of 24.5 hectares (61 acres). The lake has an average depth of 3.7 meters (12 ft) and a maximum depth of 6.5 meters (21 ft). It is 1,100 meters (3,600 ft) long, and its shoreline measures 3,190 meters (10,470 ft).

== See also ==
- List of lakes of Estonia
