= Otto Strandman =

Estonian politician, prime minister (1919), head of state (1929–1931)

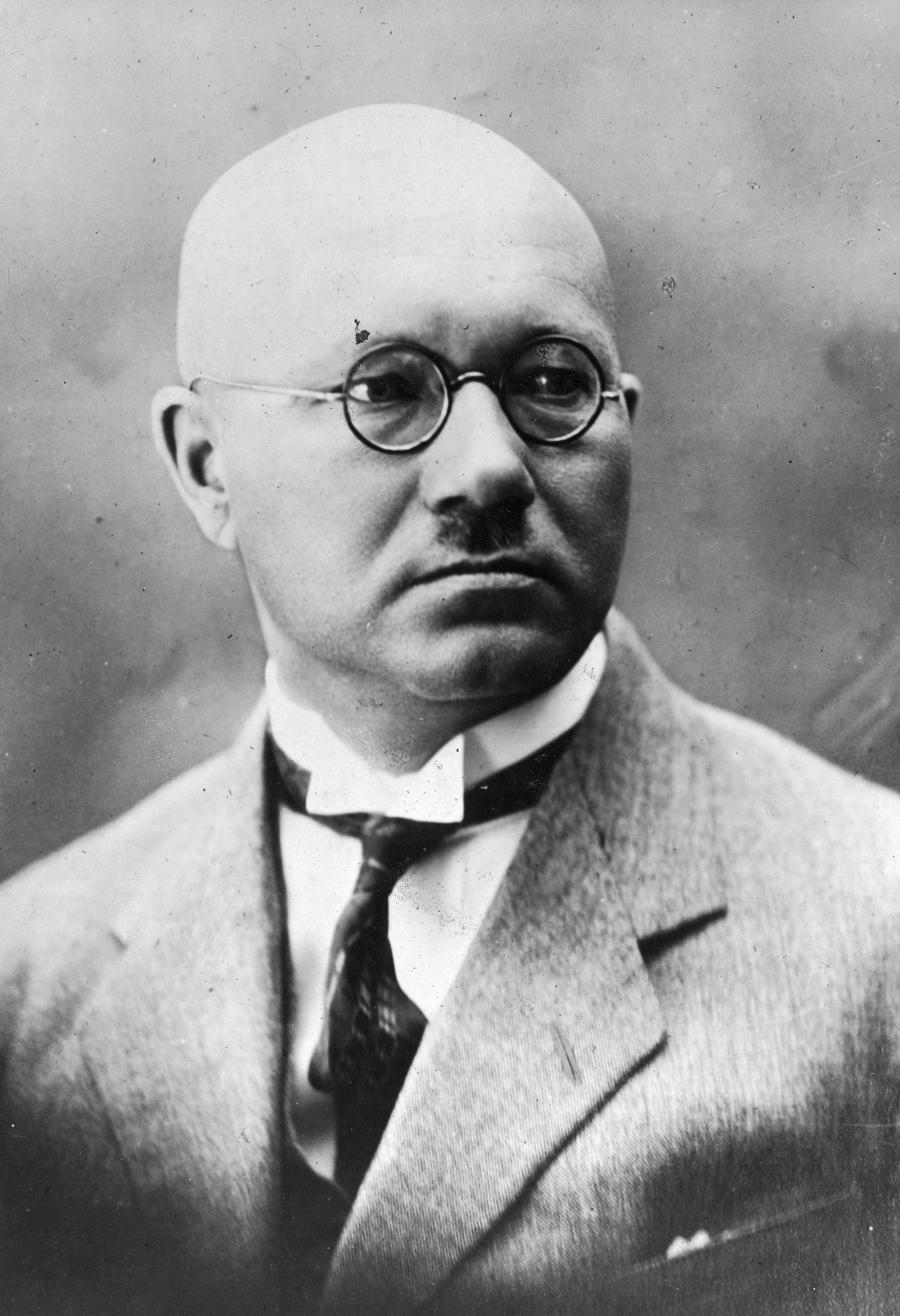
- Otto Strandman c. 1929–1930

State Elder of Estonia
- In office 9 July 1929 – 12 February 1931
- Preceded by: August Rei
- Succeeded by: Konstantin Päts

Prime Minister of Estonia
- In office 9 May 1919 – 18 November 1919
- Preceded by: Konstantin Päts as Prime Minister of the Provisional Government
- Succeeded by: Jaan Tõnisson

Personal details
- Born: Otto August Strandman; 30 November 1875 Vandu, Kreis Wierland, Governorate of Estonia, Russian Empire
- Died: 5 February 1941 (aged 65) Kadrina, then part of Estonian SSR, Soviet Union
- Party: Estonian Radical Socialist Party (1917); Estonian Labour Party (1917–1932); National Centre Party (1932–1935); Independent (1935–1941)
- Spouse: Lydia Strandman (née Hindrikson)
- Education: University of Tartu; Saint Petersburg Imperial University
- Profession: Lawyer, politician, diplomat

Otto August Strandman (Estonian pronunciation: [ˈoto ˈɑugust ˈstrɑnd.man]; 30 November [O.S. 18 November] 1875 – 5 February 1941) was an Estonian politician, who served as Prime Minister (1919) and State Elder of Estonia (1929–1931).

Strandman was one of the leaders of the centre-left Estonian Labour Party, that saw its biggest support after the 1919 and 1920 elections. Strandman was a key figure in composing the radical land reform law and the 1920 Constitution. He also served as Minister of Agriculture (1918–1919), Minister of Justice (acting 1918; 1920–1921), Minister of Finance (1924), Minister of Foreign Affairs (1918, 1920–1921 and 1924) and Minister of War (1919). During his tenure Minister of Finance, having been a critic of the previous government's policies, he pursued an anti-inflationary policy, seeing it as a method of avoiding hyperinflation and crisis. He was aiming at a 'Danish' model of a modern agricultural economy rather than indsutrialization, Strandman served as the speaker of the Estonian Provincial Assembly in 1917–1918, and as speaker of the newly independent country's parliament (Riigikogu) in 1921. He was also a diplomat, serving as the Estonian envoy in Warsaw, Poland (1927–1929), and in Paris, France (1933–1939).

After the Soviet Union invaded and occupied Estonia and the other Baltic states in June 1940, Strandman committed suicide in February 1941, after being called to appear at the local headquarters of the NKVD.

== Early life ==
Strandman was born in the village of Vandu, Undla Parish (now Kadrina Parish). His father, Hans Strandman, was a schoolteacher, and Otto was his third child.

Strandman was first educated by his father, until he began his studies at the municipal school of Rakvere in 1886, and later at Emperor Alexander State High School in Tallinn and the 5th and the 7th High School in Saint Petersburg. He graduated as an extern in 1896 after his exams in the Estonian Governorate High School of Tallinn.

After graduation, Strandman served as an official at the Tallinn Office of the State Bank of the Russian Empire until he went on to study law at the University of Tartu in 1899. In 1901 he continued his studies at the Saint Petersburg Imperial University, graduating in 1903.

== Career ==
=== Early career ===
After graduating, Strandman worked as a lawyer in Narva and Tallinn. He became known for his eloquence and was elected to be a member of Tallinn city council from 1904 to 1905. As a lawyer, he defended Estonians against Baltic Germans and state officials.

Strandman was also active in Estonian national organizations and became an activist on self-government reform, where he supported national autonomy in the Baltic governorates. Strandman was among the politicians who were supposed to compose the draft of self-government reform, but in the course of the 1905 Revolution, Strandman, like many other Estonian activists, was forced to flee abroad. At the time of the revolution, he supported radical socialist political positions, but later in his life moved towards the centre-left.

During his exile years, Strandman lived in Switzerland and other European countries. In Switzerland, Strandman and other Estonian exiles eventually did form the draft of self-government reform, but it was never implemented. Strandman returned to the Russian Empire in 1906, but he was banned from living in the Baltic governorates for three years, forcing him to live in Narva and Saint Petersburg. He returned to Estonia in 1909 and worked as an attorney, defending participants of the 1905 Revolution. He was also a keen supporter of free speech in the media. In 1917, he became a prosecutor at Tallinn District Court.

In March 1917, Strandman and some other known politicians, who were known supporters of autonomy, were chosen to compose the draft of self-government reform, that eventually created the Autonomous Governorate of Estonia. Strandman was again elected to the Tallinn City Council and, in the summer of 1917, to the Estonian Provincial Assembly, where he was part of the leftist Estonian Radical Socialist Party, led by Jüri Vilms. He served as the Chairman of the assembly between 25 October 1917 and 27 November 1918, although with periods of non-activity in between, due to the October Revolution and German occupation. After the October Revolution, Strandman led the Provincial Assembly session of 28 November [O.S. 15 November] 1917, where the assembly declared itself the highest legitimate power in Estonia. After his work as the speaker of the parliament, Strandman was acknowledged for his neutrality and punctuality.

=== Leader of the centre-left ===
After Jüri Vilms was mysteriously executed in Finland in 1918, Otto Strandman took over as acting Minister of Court. He also became one of the leaders of the Estonian Radical Socialist Party, which in 1919 would merge with the Social Travaillist Party to form the centre-left Estonian Labour Party. Strandman was however arrested by Germans in the summer of 1918.

After the German occupation ended in November 1918, Strandman continued in the Provisional Government, first as Minister of Foreign Affairs and then as Minister of Agriculture, when he also served as a deputy for Minister of Foreign Affairs Jaan Poska. As Minister of Agriculture, Strandman became the key person in composing and implementing a new land reform law. Being one of the leaders of the Labour Party, he fought hard to make the land reform as radical as possible. In result, land that had belonged to Baltic German nobility was redistributed to ethnic Estonians.

His diplomatic career started in December 1918, when he was part of the delegation to Sweden as Deputy Minister of Foreign Affairs, asking for support in the Estonian War of Independence. Eventually Sweden sent a group of volunteers to the war. To pay for his trip to Stockholm, Strandman was forced to sell his own furniture.

In the Constituent Assembly elections of 1919, the Estonian Labour Party won 30 of the 120 seats with a majority held by centre-left parties. This gave the Labour Party a chance to shape Estonian politics on a larger scale. Otto Strandman became the first Prime Minister of the country on 8 May 1919, and additionally Minister of War.

Strandman's first cabinet was a centre-left coalition with the Estonian People's Party and the Estonian Social Democratic Workers' Party. The Estonian People's Party left the coalition in September, and Strandman's cabinet resigned on 18 November 1919, being in office for half a year. The Estonian Labour Party's Ants Piip then headed a one-party minority government between 26 October 1920 and 25 January 1921, where Otto Strandman served as both Minister of Foreign Affairs and Minister of Justice. As Minister of Foreign Affairs, he established diplomatic relations between Estonia and Soviet Russia, making Estonia one of the first countries to do so.

The 1920 elections made the Estonian Labour Party the biggest party in Estonia with 22 of the 100 seats in Riigikogu, the first constitutional parliament, but the centre-right parties had also gained strength. The Estonian Labour Party remained in the coalition, headed by State Elder Konstantin Päts of Farmers' Assemblies. Strandman went on to serve as the first speaker of the Riigikogu between 4 January and 18 November 1921.

Juhan Kukk headed another Estonian Labour Party cabinet in 1922–1923, but without Strandman. In the following cabinet of Christian Democrat Friedrich Karl Akel, he returned as Minister of Foreign Affairs between 26 and 14 March May 1924 and then Minister of Finance until 16 December 1924.

=== Economic policies ===
Strandman figured several times in financial affairs. On 7 and 19 December 1923, he accused long-term inflationist Minister of Finance Georg Vestel in the parliament for incorrect spending of the state treasury. It was Strandman's criticism that eventually led to the fall of Konstantin Päts's cabinet and caused him to stay away from power from 1924 to 1931.

After the Estonian War of Independence, a large number of new businesses were started in a short time period and the industry was developed on loans, something which eventually led to financial difficulties. As Minister of Finance, Strandman proposed a plan for economic redevelopment that was supposed to reduce loans, lower the state budget and achieve a trade surplus by raising customs duties. At first, his actions saw little effect and he was criticised from both left- and right-wing parties, but eventually the Estonian mark stabilized, integrating the Estonian economy more with Europe. He also supported building the economy on agriculture rather than transit between Russia and Europe, regarding Denmark as a model agricultural country. In the media, his policies were mockingly called UMP (Uus majanduspoliitika – "New Economic Policy" (nep)) and KUMP (Kõige uuem majanduspoliitika – "Newest Economic Policy") after the economic policy in the Soviet Union at the time. In May 1924, Strandman didn't blame his predecessor Georg Vestel for deliberately creating hyperinflation, only for sheer optimism about his policies.

For almost five years, Strandman didn't hold any important offices. He remained active in parliamentary politics and became known for his eloquence. As leader of the centre-left, his work continued to have a great effect on the economy, since he achieved for same kind of policies as he had implemented during his term as Minister of Finance. Economic historian Jaak Valge has argued that it was thanks to Strandman's rapid and decisive work that Estonia was able to avoid hyperinflation in the early 1920s. It was Strandman who made the suggestion to name the new Estonian currency the "kroon", after the currencies of the Scandinavian countries.

=== Late political career ===
As the Estonian Labour Party slowly turned from leftist to centrist, its popularity fell, leaving its highlights to the 1919 Constituent Assembly and 1920 Riigikogu elections. The party achieved only 12 of the 100 seats in 1923 elections, 13 in 1926 and 10 in 1929, until it finally merged with other centrist parties to form the National Centre Party in 1932.

During a governmental crisis in July 1926, the speaker of the Riigikogu Karl August Einbund gave Strandman the task to form a cabinet. His economic programme still consisted of lowering the budget and reducing loans, something which was unacceptable to the right-wing Settlers' Party and Farmers' Assemblies.

From 1927 to 1929, Strandman served as Estonian envoy to Poland, with additional accreditation to Czechoslovakia and Romania, residing in Warsaw. In June 1929, he unexpectedly resigned and returned to Estonian politics to head his second cabinet, starting from 9 July 1929. It was a coalition between his Labour Party, People's Party, Christian People's Party, Farmers' Assemblies and the Settlers' Party, combining almost all political parties from the centre-left to right. Before taking office, he criticized the parliament for becoming a "factory of inadequate laws". His cabinet remained in office until 12 February 1931. It is however ironic, that the Great Depression reached Estonia when the head of government was Strandman, who had always supported cautious economic and financial policies. It was thanks to his strong skills in economics and finance that the coalition lasted for a relatively long time, 1 year and 7 months.

During his time in office, he made a state visit to Poland in February 1930, where he met both President Ignacy Mościcki and Marshal Józef Piłsudski to propose the formation of a Baltic Entente, something which however didn't find Polish support. On his return home, he visited Vilnius, which was controlled by Poland at the time. The visit damaged the relations between Estonia and Lithuania, with Dovas Zaunius, Lithuania's Minister of Foreign Affairs, protesting the visit as a breach of neutrality in the Vilnius disputeBy 1931, Estonian-Lithuanian relations had somewhat healed. In August 1930, Strandman hosted President Mościcki in Estonia.

Membership in the parliament:

- 1917–1919 Estonian Provincial Assembly (Maapäev)
- 1919–1920 Estonian Constituent Assembly (Asutav kogu)
- 1920–1923 I Riigikogu
- 1923–1926 II Riigikogu
- 1926–1927 III Riigikogu
- 1929–1932 IV Riigikogu
- 1932 V Riigikogu

=== Later diplomatic career and death ===
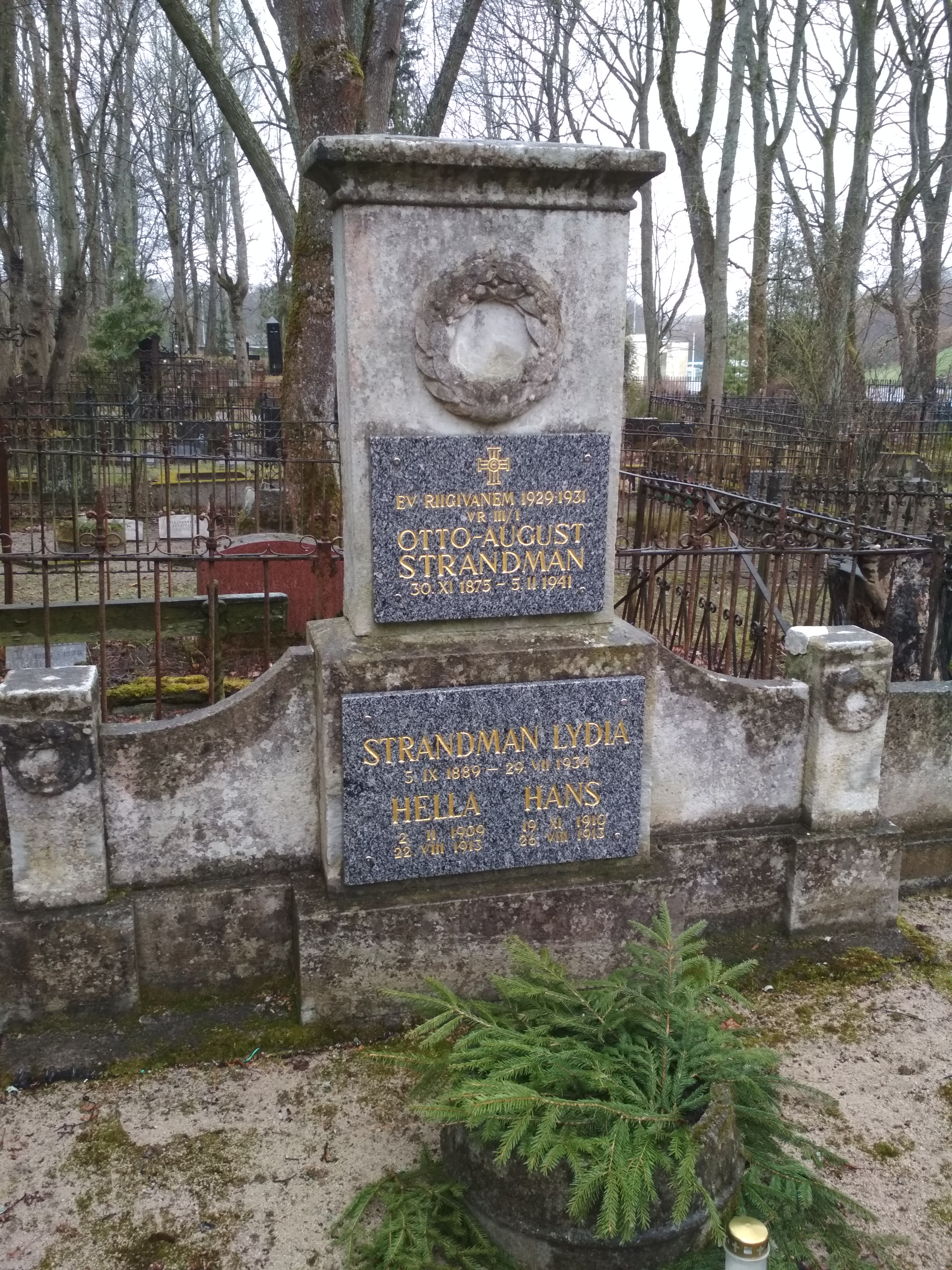
Grave of Otto Strandman

From 1933 to 1939 Strandman was envoy of Estonia to France, Belgium, Spain and the Holy See, residing in Paris. In 1936 he supported Juhan Kukk, Ants Piip, Jaan Teemant, and Jaan Tõnisson, who signed a memorandum addressed to Prime Minister in duties of the State Elder Konstantin Päts, demanding civil freedoms and an end to his authoritarian rule. In 1938, Strandman became a judge at the Permanent Court of International Justice in The Hague.

In 1939, Strandman returned to Estonia, but retired from public life due to ill health. As he was not active in politics, he was initially left alone after the Soviet occupation in 1940. In 1941 however, Strandman received a formal notice to appear at the local headquarters of the NKVD. Realizing his fate, he shot himself to death in his home in Kadrina on 5 February 1941. He was buried in Tallinn's Sisekalmistu Cemetery.

== Cultural activities ==
Strandman was on the board of the Estonia Society and Tallinn Savings and Loans Society (Tallinna Vastastikune Krediitühisus). He was a member of the Estonian Students' Society since 1899, and received honorary doctorates from the University of Tartu in 1928 and Warsaw University in 1930. Strandman renounced all honours and awards that had been given to him.

== Personal life ==
In 1907, Strandman married Lydia Hindrikson (1889–1934). They had three children; their daughter Hella (1909–1913) and son Hans (1911–1913) both died at an early age, with only the second daughter, Lydia (1914–1966), surviving into adulthood.

== Honours ==
=== National Honours ===
- Estonia: Cross of Liberty, III class, 1st degree (1920)
- Estonia: Order of the Estonian Red Cross, 3rd class (1921)
- Estonia: Order of the Estonian Red Cross, 2nd class (1928)
- Estonia: Order of the Estonian Red Cross, 1st class (1929)
- Estonia: Order of the Cross of the Eagle, 1st class (1930)

Government offices
Preceded by Konstantin Päts; Prime Minister of the Provisional Government	Prime Minister of Estonia; 1919	Succeeded by Jaan Tõnisson
Preceded by August Rei	State Elder of Estonia; 1929–1931	Succeeded by Konstantin Päts
Government offices
Preceded by Jüri Vilms	Acting Minister of Court of Estonia; 1918	Succeeded by Jaan Poska
Preceded by Jaan Poska	Minister of Foreign Affairs of Estonia; 1918	Succeeded by Jaan Poska
Preceded by Jaan Raamot	Minister of Agriculture of Estonia; 1918–1919	Succeeded by Theodor Pool
Preceded by Konstantin Päts	Minister of War of Estonia; 1919	Succeeded by August Hanko
Preceded by Ado Birk; Minister of Foreign Affairs	Minister of Foreign Affairs and Court of Estonia; 1920–1921	Succeeded by Ants Piip; Acting Minister of Foreign Affairs
Preceded by Jüri Jaakson; Minister of Court	Minister of Foreign Affairs and Court of Estonia; 1920–1921	Succeeded by Karl August Baars; Acting Minister of Court
Preceded by Friedrich Karl Akel	Minister of Foreign Affairs of Estonia; 1924	Succeeded by Karl Robert Pusta
Preceded by Karl August Baars	Minister of Finance of Estonia; 1924	Succeeded by Leo Sepp
Political offices
Preceded by Artur Vallner	Chairman of the Estonian Provincial Assembly; 1917–1918	Succeeded by Ado Birk
Preceded by August Rei; Chairman of the Constituent Assembly	President of the Riigikogu; 1921	Succeeded by Juhan Kukk
