= Vandu =

Village in Estonia

Coordinates: 59°19′N 26°12′E

- Village
- Interactive map of Vandu
- Country: Estonia
- County: Lääne-Viru County
- Parish: Kadrina Parish
- Time zone: UTC+2 (EET)
  - Summer (DST): UTC+3 (EEST)

Vandu is a village in Kadrina Parish, Lääne-Viru County, in northeastern Estonia.

Estonian Prime Minister and State Elder Otto Strandman (1875–1941) was born in Vandu.
