= Jüri Jaakson's cabinet =

Government of Estonia from 1924 to 1925

Jüri Jaakson's cabinet was in office in Estonia from 16 December 1924 to 15 December 1925, when it was succeeded by Jaan Teemant's first cabinet.

== Members ==
This cabinet's members were the following:

Name	Portrait	Position
Jüri Jaakson		Prime Minister
Karl Einbund		Minister of the Interior
Karl Robert Pusta		Minister of Foreign Affairs
Leo Sepp		Minister of Finance
August Kerem		Minister of Agricultural Affairs
Karl Johannes Virma		Minister of Transport
Rudolf Gabrel		Minister of Justice
Hugo-Bernhard Rahamägi		Minister of Education
