= Atra, Estonia =

Village in Estonia

Atra
- Village
- Location in Estonia
- Coordinates: 58°07′38″N 26°17′16″E
- Country: Estonia
- County: Valga County
- Municipality: Elva Parish

Population (01.01.2011)
  - Total: 46

Atra is a village in Elva Parish, Valga County in southeastern Estonia. It's located about 13 km (8 mi) southwest of the town of Elva and about 14 km (9 mi) northwest of the town of Otepää. Atra has a population of 46 (as of 1 January 2011).

The Tartu–Valga railway passes Atra on its eastern side, the nearest station is located in the neighbouring Palupera village.

Journalist, banker, and politician Christian Kaarna (1882–1943) was born in Atra.
