= Ernst Raatma =

Estonian politician

Ernst Raatma (also Ernst Rosenberg; 17 February 1891, in Helme Parish, Viljandi County – 21 September 1959, in Rakvere) was an Estonian politician. He was a member of the III Riigikogu, starting on 24 October 1928, when he replaced Kristjan Kaarna.
