= Hellenurme =

Village in Estonia

- Village
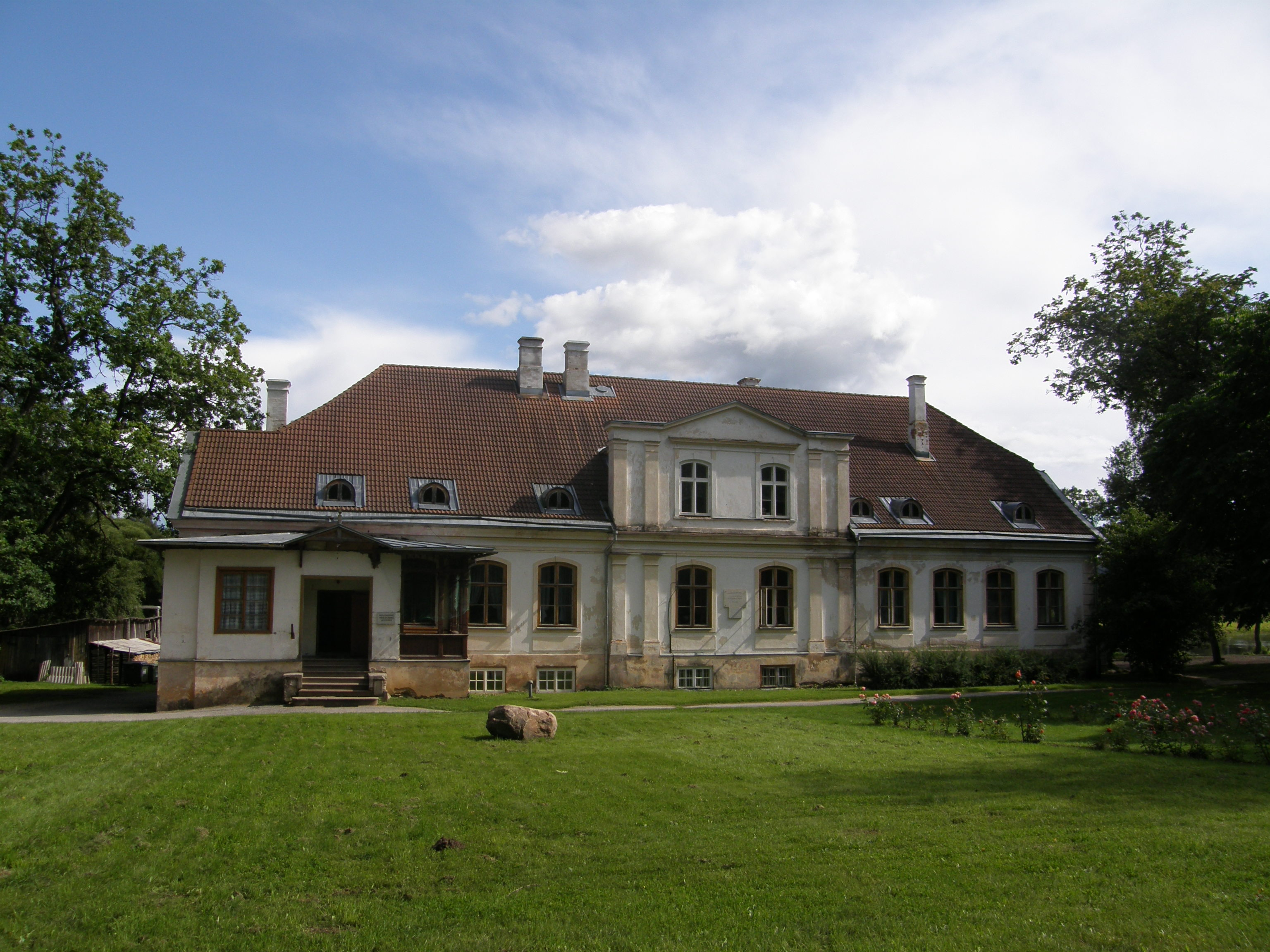
- Hellenurma manor house

- Location in Estonia
- Coordinates: 58°08′07″N 26°22′57″E
- Country: Estonia
- County: Valga County
- Municipality: Elva Parish
- First mentioned: 1641

Population (01.01.2011)
  - Total: 170

Hellenurme (German: Hellenorm) is a village in Valga County in southeastern Estonia, about 10 km (6 mi) south of Elva and 11 km (7 mi) northwest of Otepää. It was the administrative centre of Palupera Parish and had a population of 170 on 1 January 2011. The Tartu–Valga railway passes on its western side; the nearest station is 4 km away in the village of Palupera.

== Manor ==
Hellenurme Manor (German: Hellenorm) was first mentioned in 1641, when it belonged to the Wrangells. After the Great Northern War, the owners were the Dückers and Bruiningks. From 1850 until its dispossession in 1919, it belonged to the Middendorffs. The one-storey main building was built from stone at the end of the 18th century and rebuilt in the 19th century. A nursery and preschool now operate there.

About a kilometre from the manor's centre is a Classicist chapel and the Middendorff family graveyard. The zoologist and explorer Alexander von Middendorff, who lived in the manor from 1842 to 1845, is buried there.

== Gallery ==
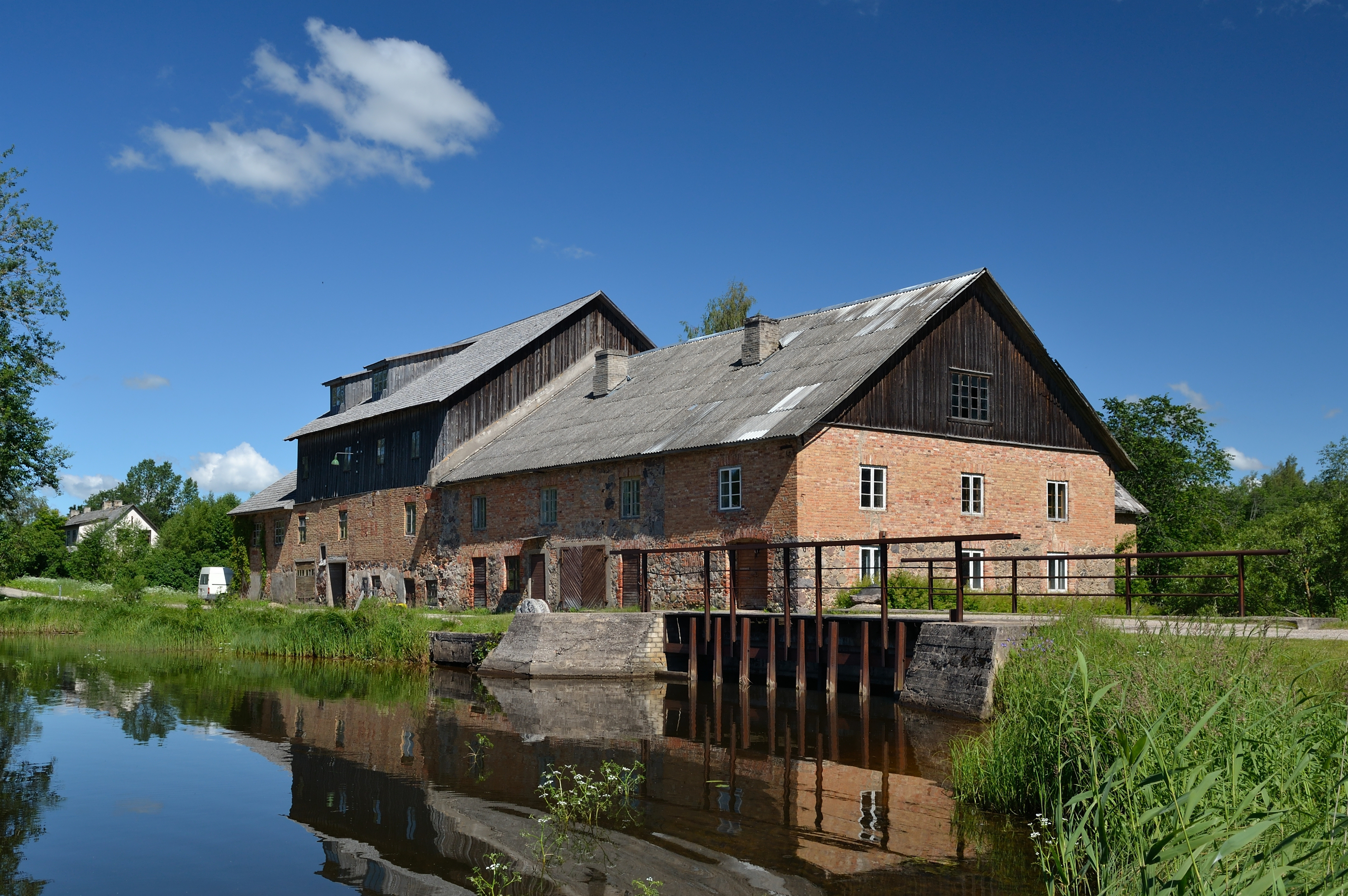
Manor watermill

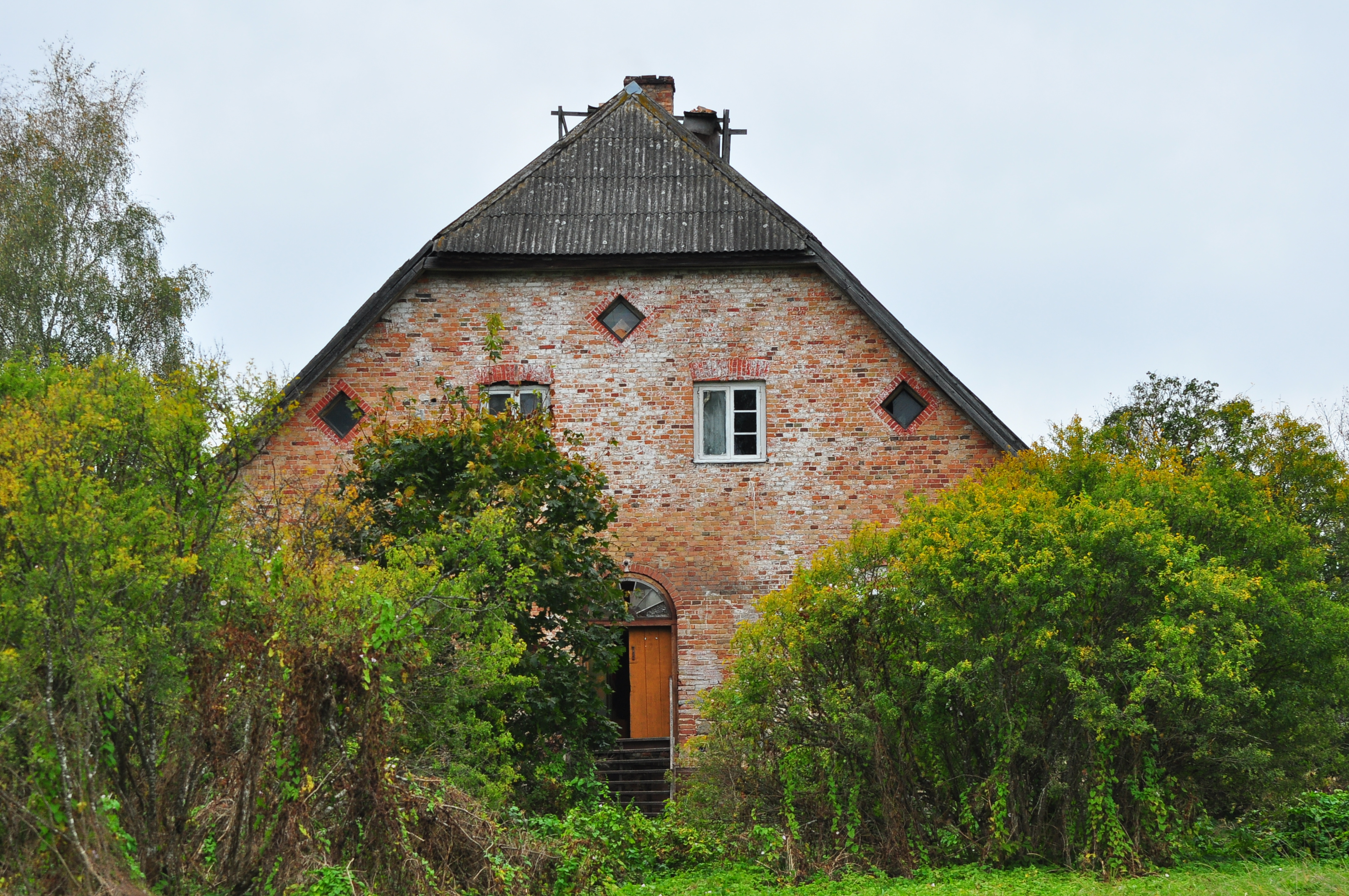
Stable

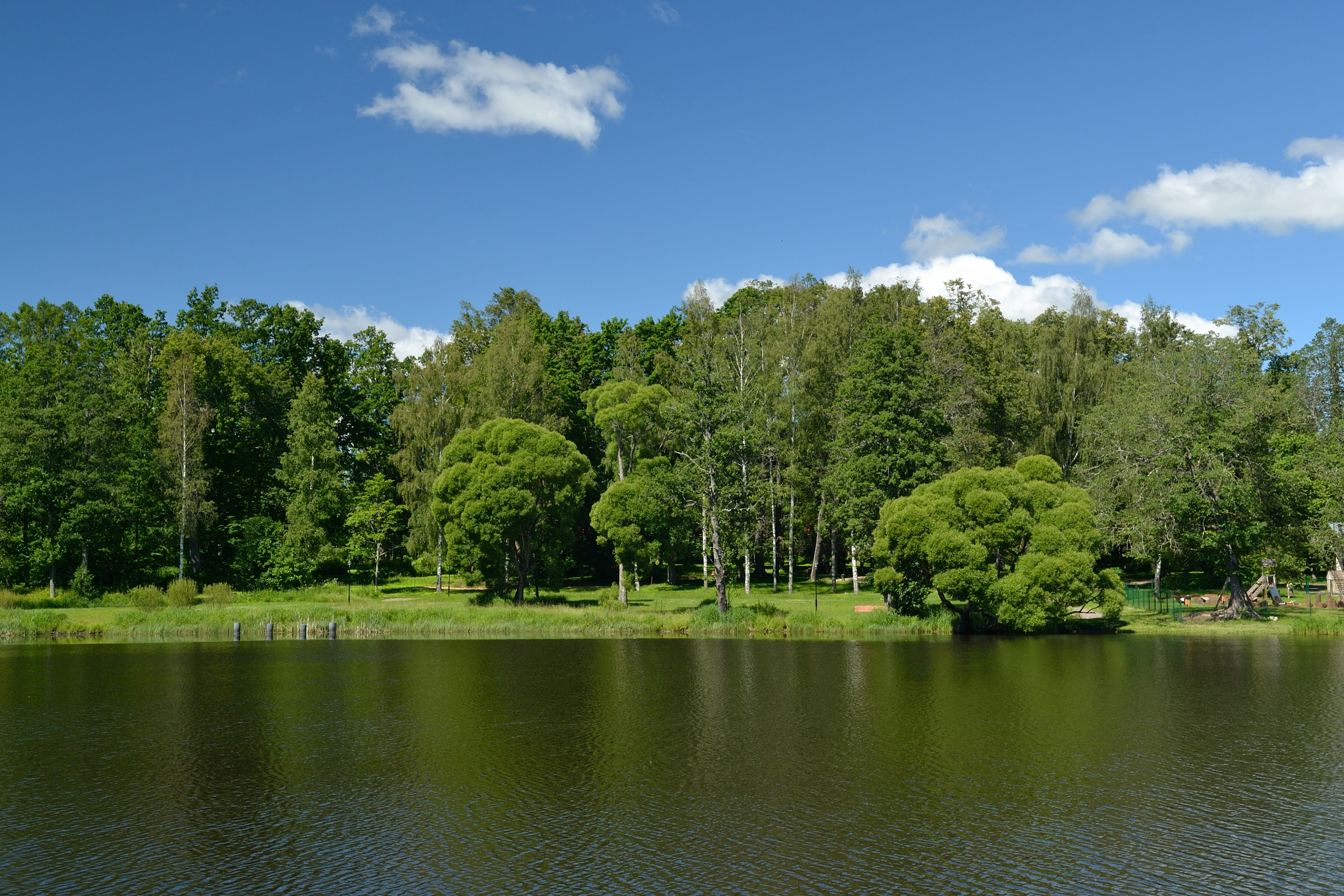
Park

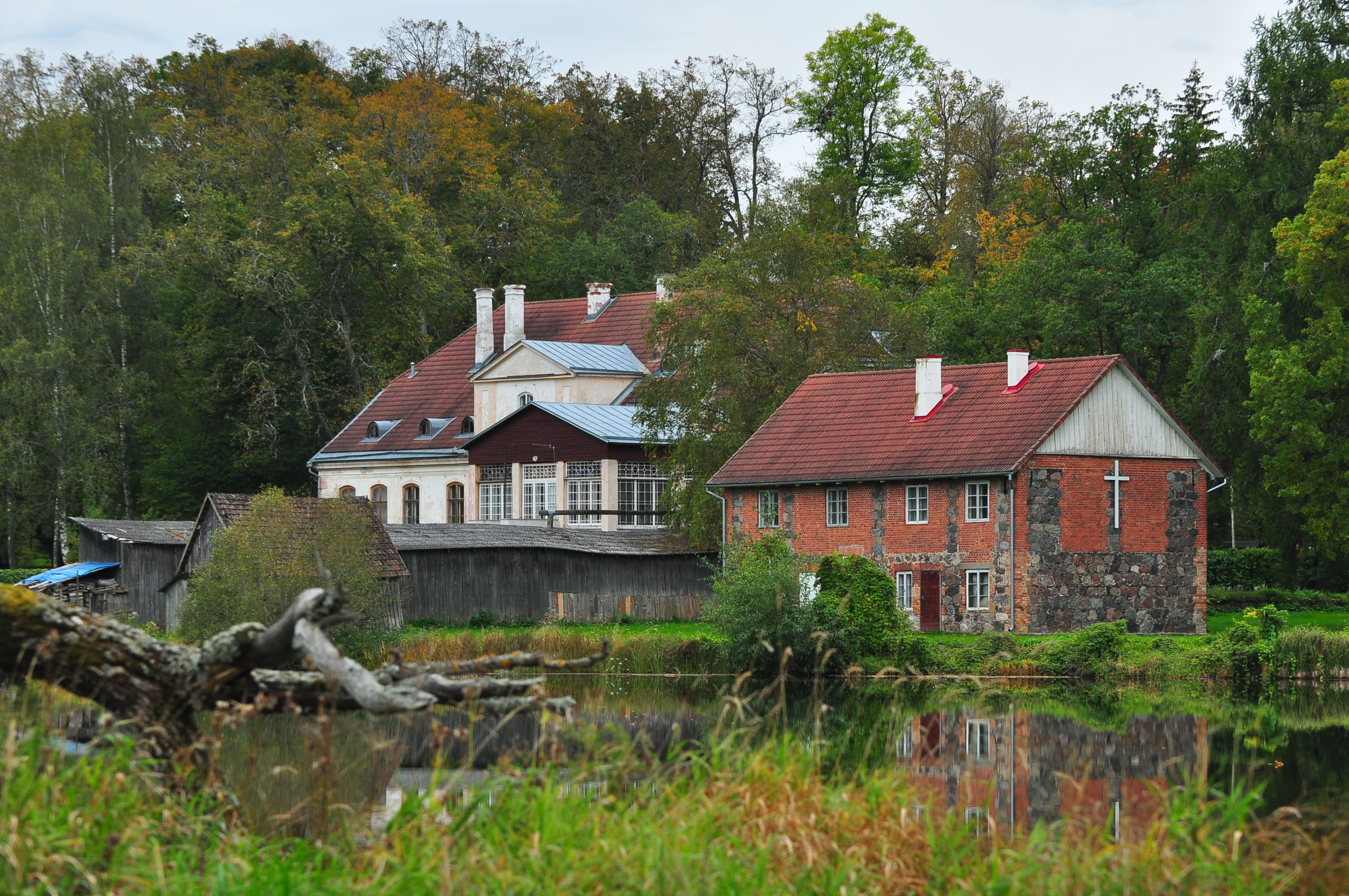
Dairy kitchen
