= Päidla =

Village in Estonia

- village
- Location in Estonia
- Coordinates: 58°07′09″N 26°28′31″E
- Country: Estonia
- County: Valga County
- Municipality: Otepää Parish
- First mentioned: 1522

Government
  - Village elder: Nikolai Metslind (EKRE)

Population (01.01.2011)
  - Total: 94

Päidla is a village in Otepää Parish, Valga County in southeastern Estonia. It's located about 6 km (4 mi) north of the town of Otepää. Päidla has a population of 94 (as of 1 January 2011).

Besides the 23.8 ha (59 acres) Lake Mõrtsuka, there are several smaller lakes located in the village: Ahvenjärv, Kalmejärv, Kõverjärv, Mõisajärv, Näkijärv and Uibujärv. The landscape around the lakes is hilly.

Päidla Manor was first mentioned in 1522 as Krowelshof, later known as Samhof and Paidel. In the 19th century it was owned by explorer Alexander von Middendorff. Nowadays the manor buildings are destroyed, only an alley has survived.

== Gallery ==
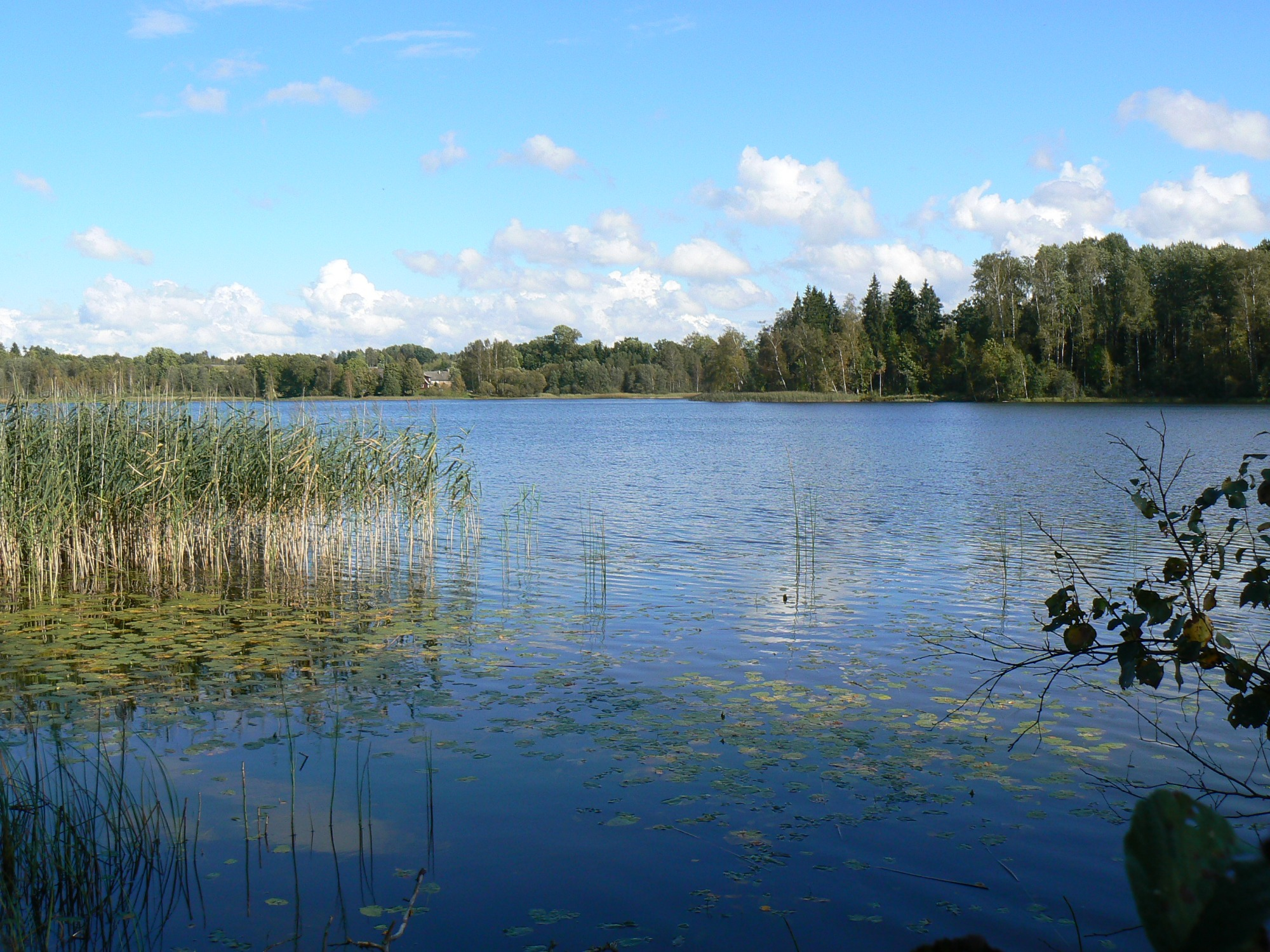
Mõisajärv

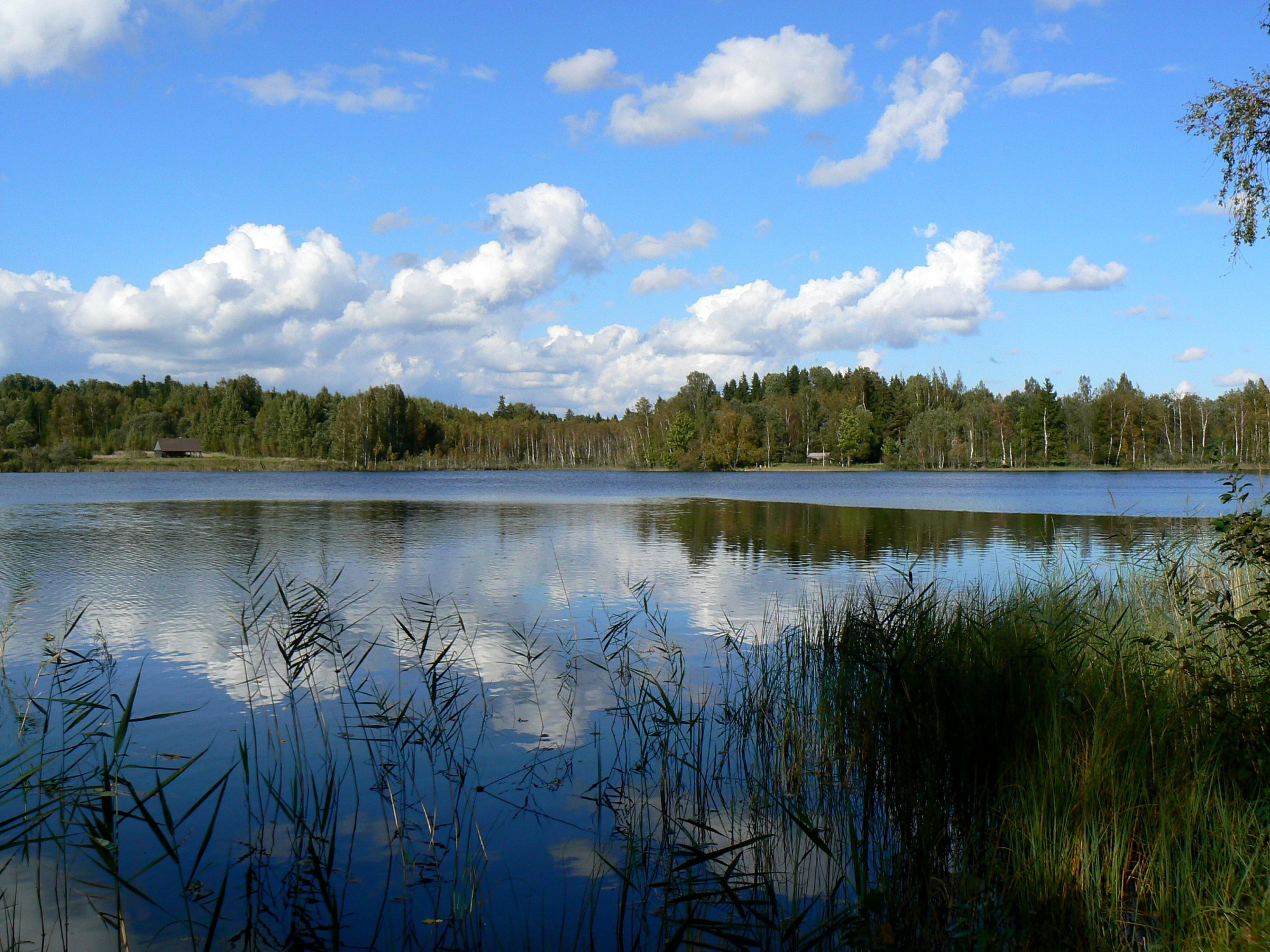
Näkijärv

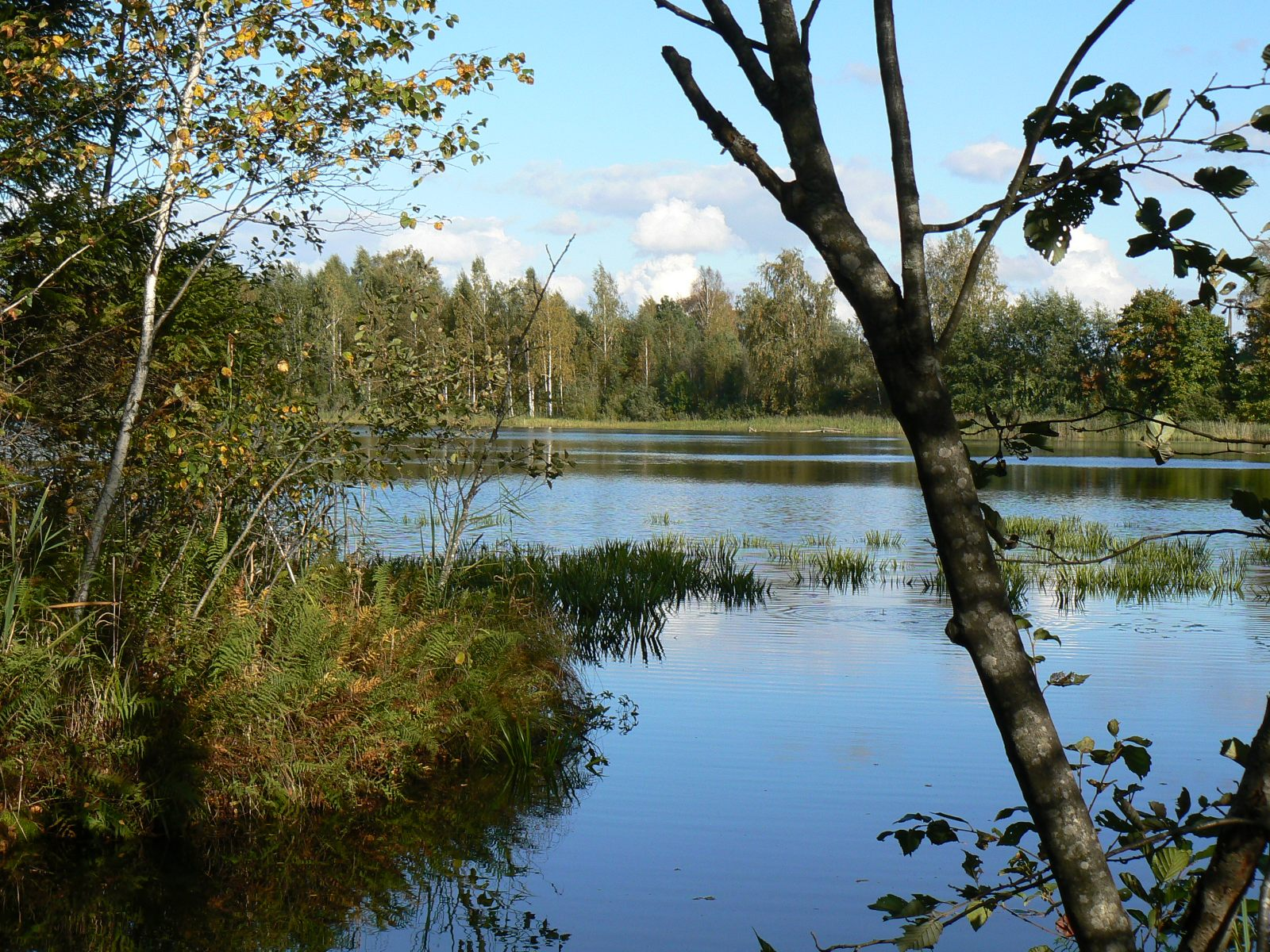
Ahvenjärv
