= Leigo Lakes =

Group of lakes in Estonia

- Leigo järved (Estonian)
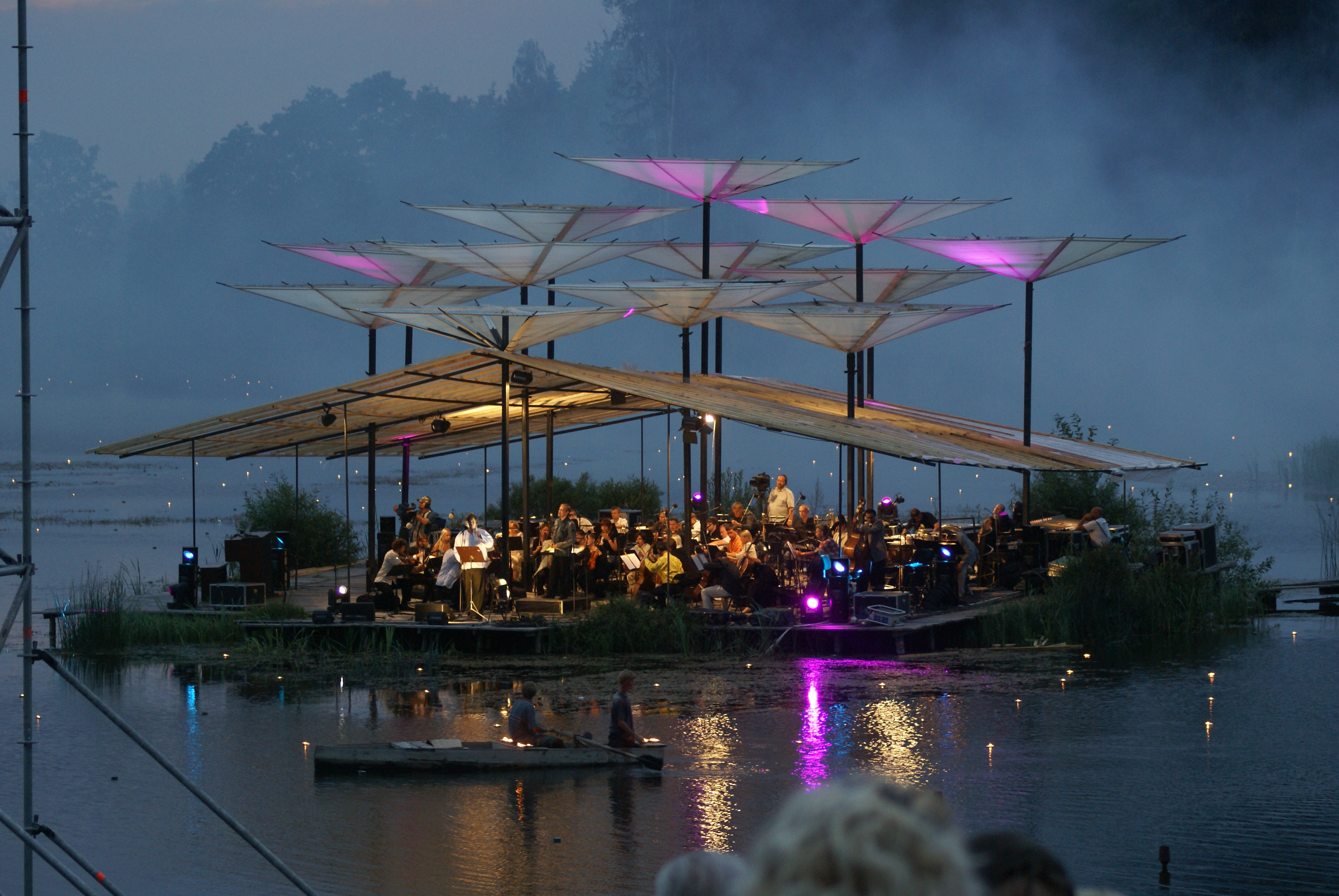
- Leigo Lake Music Festival stage

- Location within Estonia
- Coordinates: 58°7′56.65″N 26°33′1.8″E
- Basin countries: Estonia

The Leigo Lakes (Estonian: Leigo järved) are a group of sixteen artificial lakes in Otepää Parish, Estonia.

== See also ==
- List of lakes of Estonia
