= Aleksander Veidermann =

Estonian politician (1888–1972)

Aleksander August Veidermann (also Aleksander Veiderma; 7 April 1888 in Üdruma – 23 February 1972 in Tallinn) was an Estonian politician.

1922-1923 he was Minister of Education.
