= Jaak Reichmann =

Estonian politician

Jaak Reichmann (28 May 1874 Tarvastu Parish (now Viljandi Parish), Kreis Fellin – 1 May 1945 Tallinn) was an Estonian politician. He was a member of II Riigikogu, representing the Farmers' Assemblies.

1921-1922 he was Minister of Justice.
