= Bernhard Rostfeld =

Estonian politician

Bernhard Rostfeld (also Bernhard Aleksander Roostfeld or Rostfeldt or Roostfelt; 5 January 1884 – 28 January 1948 in Karaganda, Kazakhstan) was an Estonian politician and banker.

Political offices:

- 1921 Minister of Communications
- 1921–1922 Minister of Agriculture and Nutrition
- 1922–1923 Minister of Agriculture
- 1923–1924 Minister of Commerce and Industry
