= Leida Tigane =

Estonian writer

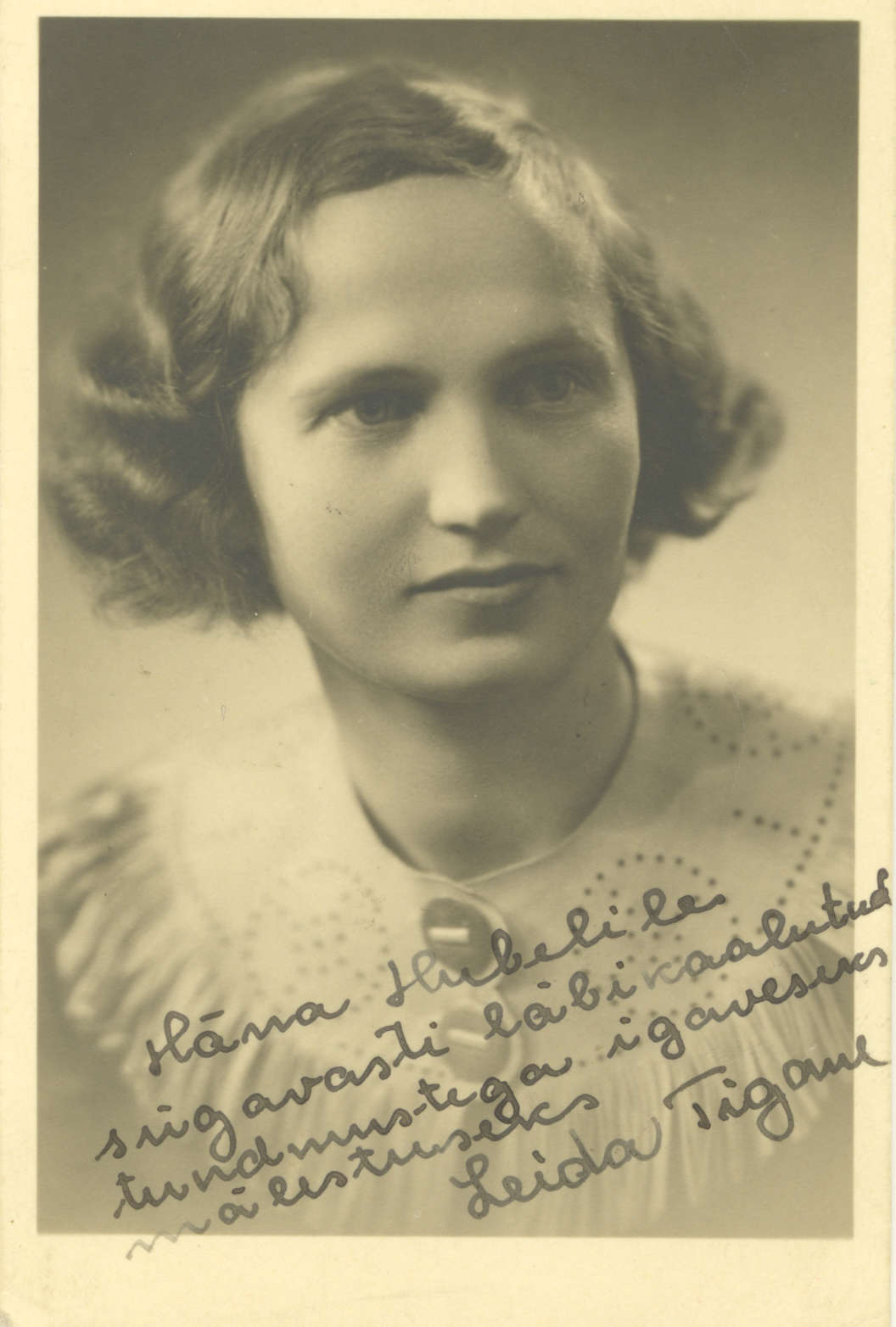
Leida Tigane

Leida Tigane (21 May 1908 Tartu – 13 February 1983 Tallinn) was an Estonian prose and children's writer.

In 1927, she graduated from Girls' Gymnasium of Estonian Youth Education Society. After that, she had several jobs: working for the scientific publisher Teaduslik Kirjandus, working for the newspaper Postimees, and working for the cultural newspaper Sirp ja Vasar.

From 1949, she was a member of CPSU.

== Works ==
- "Hunt ja kutsikas" (1948)
- "Jutte lastele" (1955)
- "Lugu kahest laisast varesest" (1959)
- "Mina oskan paremini" (1952)
- "Peremees ja sulane" (1958)
- "Seitse pastlapaari" (1974)
- "Tera siit ja teine sealt" (1968)
- "Vanaema maja" (1946)
- "Vikerkaar"
- "Sõber meriröövel"
- "Palun seda härrat"
