= Karl Ipsberg =

Estonian politician (1870–1943)

Karl Ipsberg (3 January 1870 in Suure-Kambja Parish (now Kambja Parish), Kreis Dorpat – 27 June 1943 in Vjatka Camp, Kirov Oblast, Russian SFSR) was an Estonian politician. He was a member of the Estonian National Assembly and of the I and II Riigikogu, representing the Farmers' Assemblies.

1921-1922 he was Minister of Roads.

He was taken prisoner by the Soviets for his resistance against the incorporation of Estonia into the Soviet Union, and was shot in prison in Vyatka in 1943. He is memorialised on a plaque in Stenbock House, Estonia's seat of government.
