= Rudolf Gabrel =

Estonian politician

Rudolf Gabrel (also Rudolf Gabriel; 1 September 1871 – 20 July 1940) was an Estonian politician.

1923-1924 he was Minister of Justice.
