= Georg Vestel =

Estonian entrepreneur and politician

Georg Vestel (11 November 1882 Saadjärve Parish – 5 February 1933 Tallinn) was an Estonian entrepreneur and politician.

From 1921 to 1924 he was Minister of Finance.
