= Palupera =

Village in Estonia

- Village
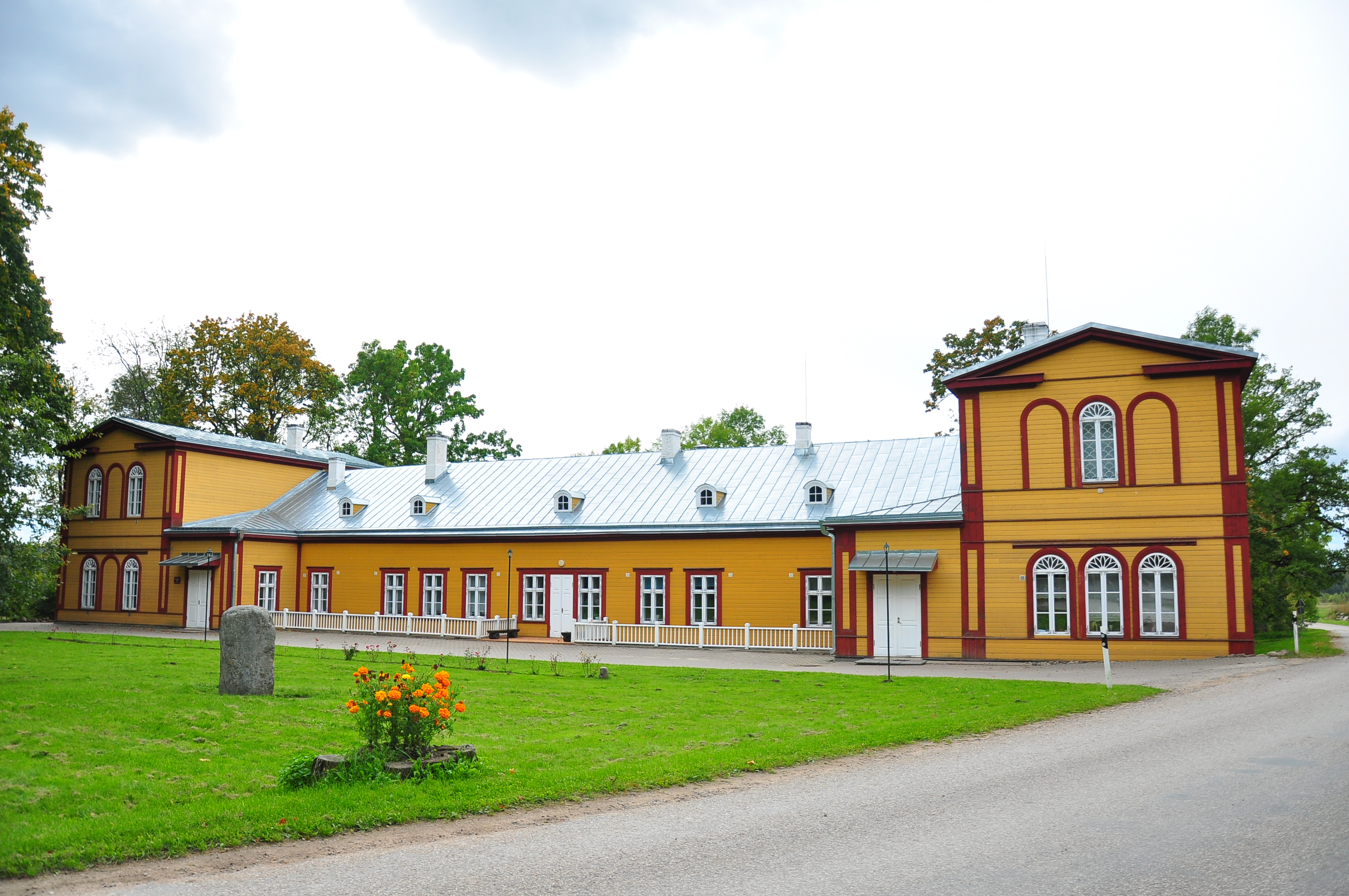
- Main building of Palupera Manor.

- Location in Estonia
- Coordinates: 58°07′01″N 26°20′37″E
- Country: Estonia
- County: Valga County
- Municipality: Elva Parish

Population (01.01.2011)
  - Total: 198

Palupera (German: Palloper) is a village in Elva Parish, Valga County in southeastern Estonia. It is located about 11 km (7 mi) northwest of the town of Otepää and about 12 km (7 mi) southwest of the town of Elva. Palupera has a population of 198 (as of 1 January 2011).

The politician Mai Treial (born 1952) was born in Palupera.

== Gallery ==
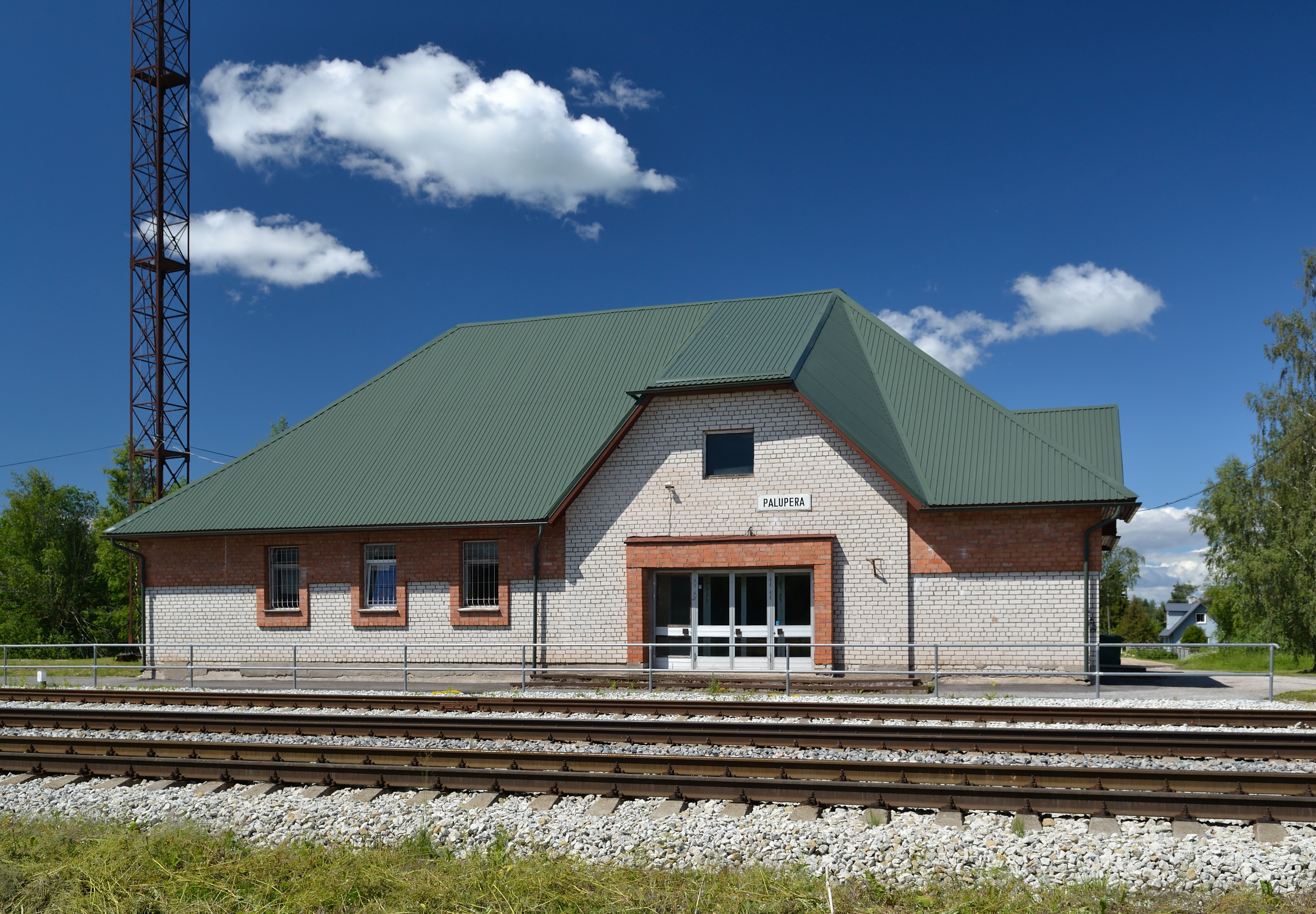
Palupera railway station

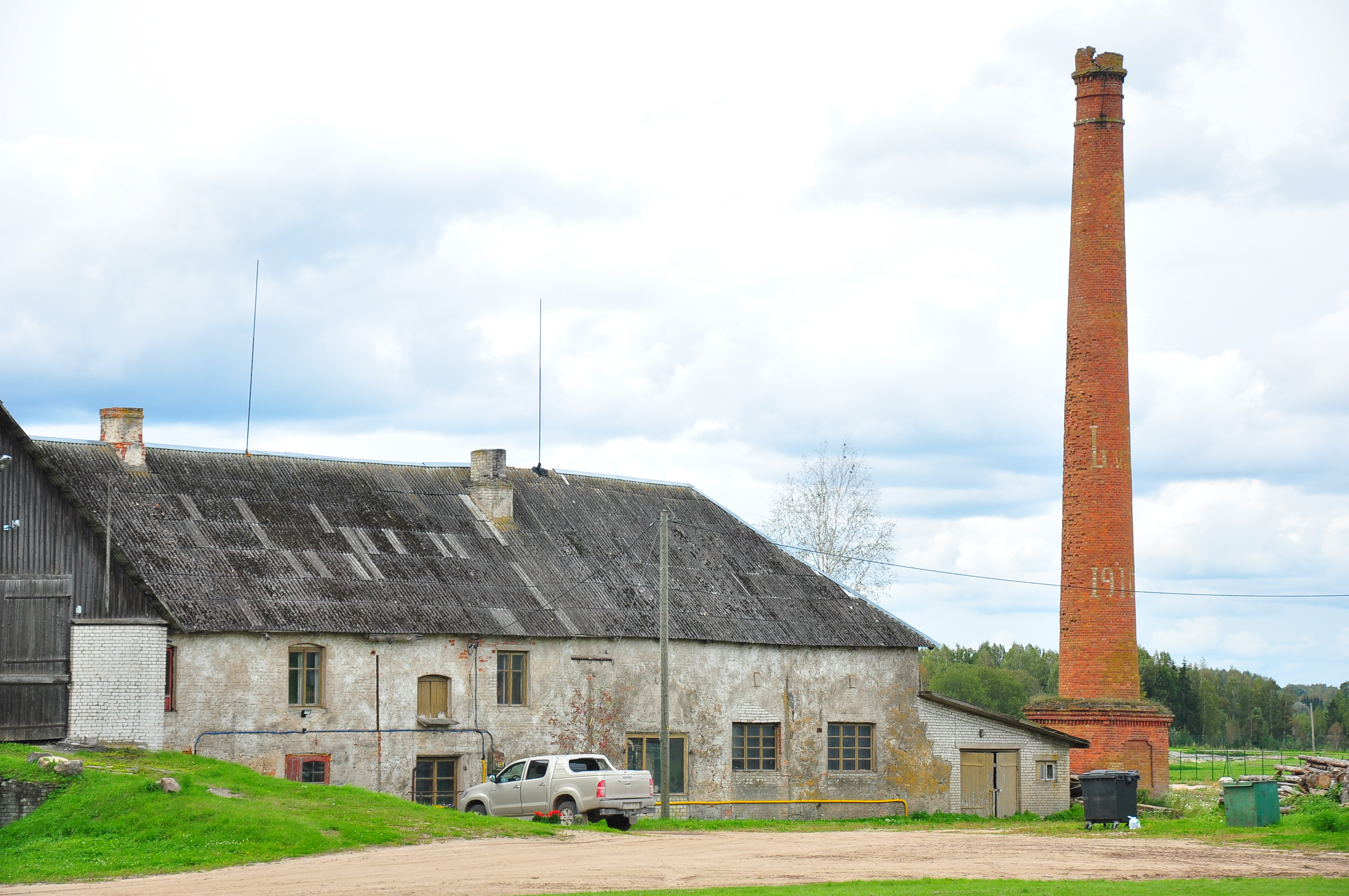
Palupera manor's distillery

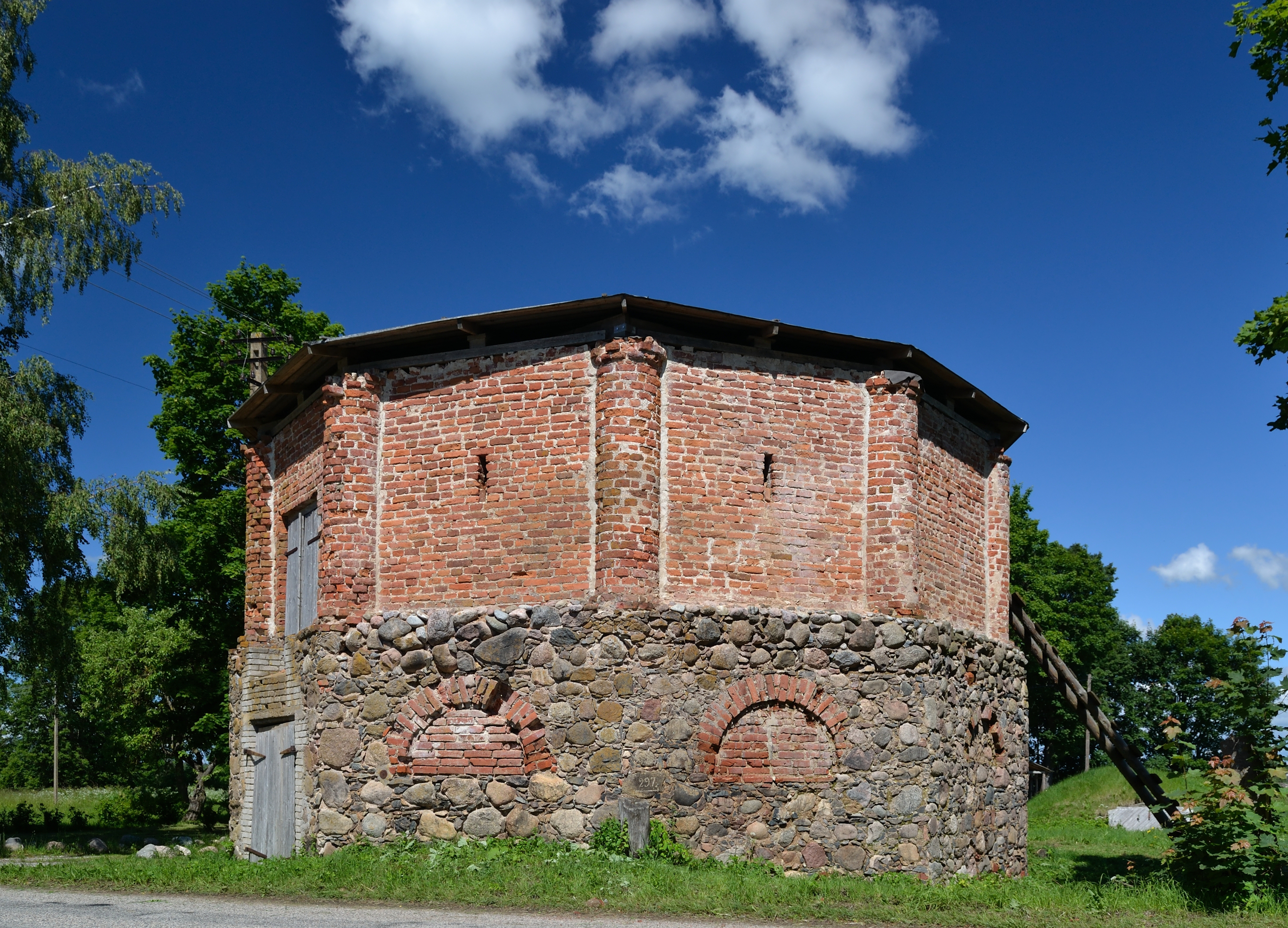
Palupera manor's granary

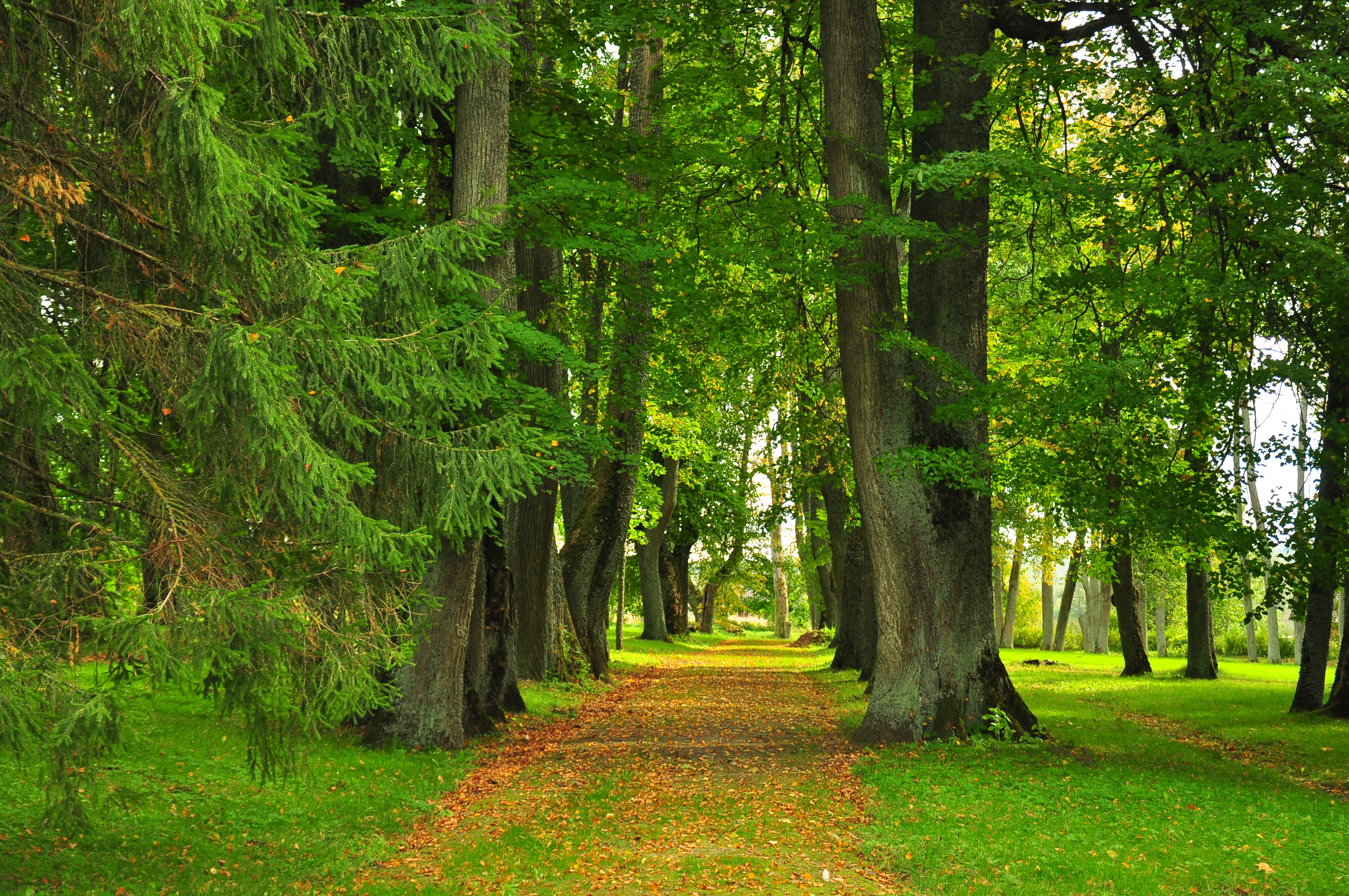
Palupera park

Preceding station	Elron	Following station
Elva towards Tallinn	Tallinn–Tartu–Valga	Puka towards Valga
