= Henn =

Male given name and family name

Henn is a both a surname and an Estonian masculine given name.

Notable people with the name include:

== As a given name ==
- Henn-Ants Kurg (1898–1943), Estonian military colonel and diplomat
- Henn Pärn (born 1941), Estonian politician
- Henn Põlluaas (born 1960), Estonian politician
- Henn Põlluste (born 1952), Estonian wrestler and wrestling coach
- Henn Saari (1924–1999), Estonian linguist
- Henn Treial (1905–1941), Estonian journalist, editor and politician

== As a surname ==
- Alexander Henn, German anthropologist
- Arthur Henn (disambiguation)
- Bernhart Henn (1817–1865), American politician
- Christian Henn (born 1964), German road racing cyclist
- Dirk Henn (born 1960), German-style board game designer
- Guy Henn (1909–1998), Australian doctor and politician
- Hans Henn (20th century), West German bobsledder
- Harry George Henn (1919–1994), American law professor
- Henry Henn (1858–1931), Church of England bishop
- Jaco Henn (born 1974), South African sport shooter
- John Henn (1941–2020), American volleyball player
- Jürgen Henn (born 1987), Estonian football manager
- Luca Henn (born 1997), German racing cyclist
- Mark Henn (born 1958), American animator
- Matthias Henn (born 1985), German footballer
- Pablo Henn (born 1982), Argentine rugby player
- Percy Henn (1865–1955), English-Australian clergyman and teacher
- Preston Henn (1931–2017), American entrepreneur
- Sean Henn (born 1981), American baseball player
- Steve Henn (born 1976), American poet and editor
- Sydney Henn (1861–1936), British politician
- Thomas Rice Henn (1901–1974), Irish literary critic
- William Henn (c. 1720 – 1796), Irish judge

== See also ==
- Hehn and Hen (disambiguation)
- Henn., taxonomic author abbreviation of Paul Christoph Hennings (1841–1908), German mycologist and herbarium curator
- Henn-Collins
- Henna (disambiguation)
