= Neitsijärv =

Lake in Estonia

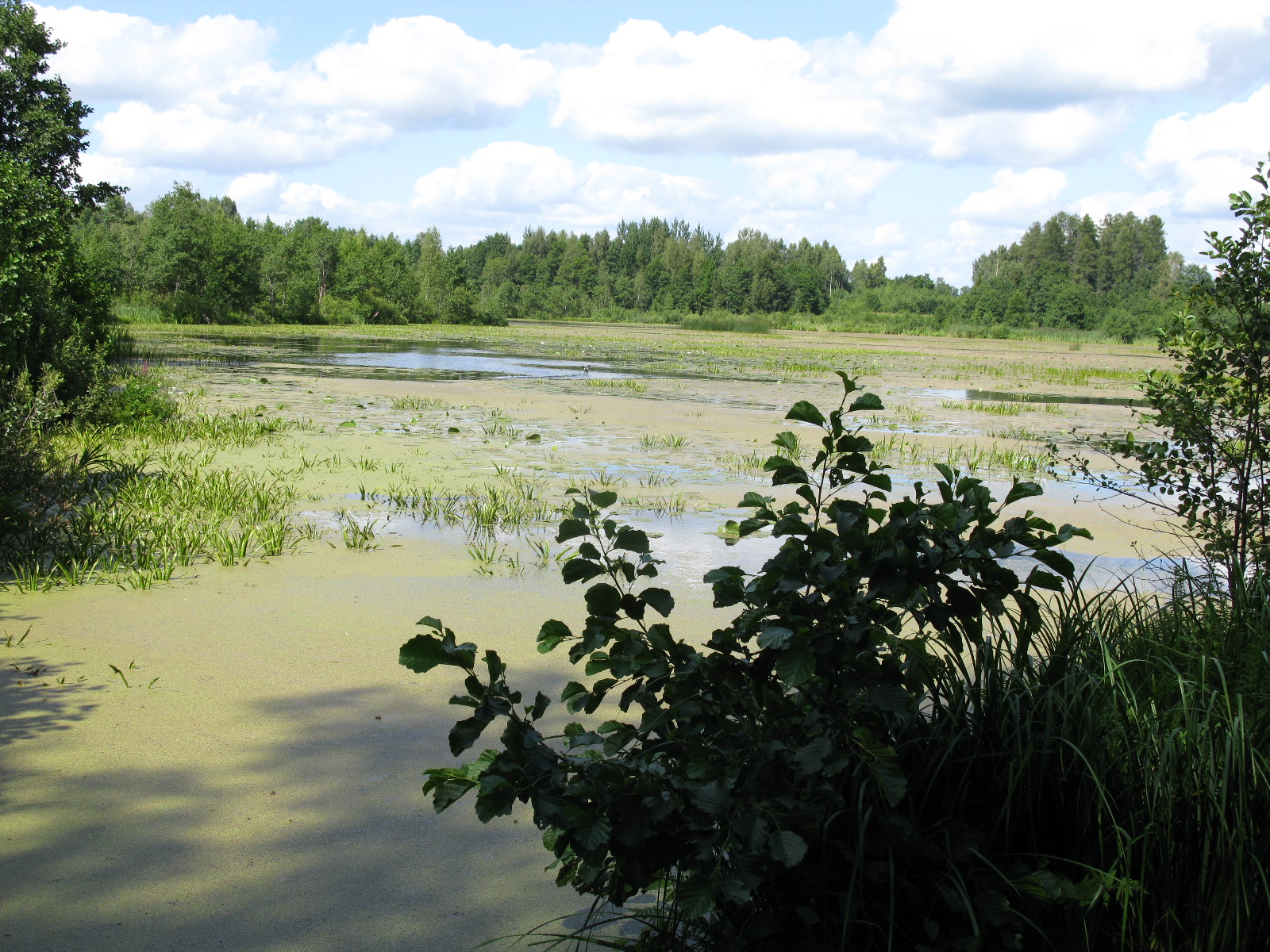

- Location within Estonia
- Location: Valga District
- Coordinates: 58.0491862°N 26.4669985°E
- Basin countries: Estonia
- Max. length: 400 meters (1,300 ft)
- Surface area: 8.0 hectares (20 acres)
- Max. depth: 1.2 meters (3 ft 11 in)
- Shore length^{1}: 1,330 meters (4,360 ft)
- Surface elevation: 115.4 meters (379 ft)
- ^{1} Shore length is not a well-defined measure.

Neitsijärv is a lake in Estonia. It is located in the village of Pühajärve in Otepää Parish, Valga County. Neitsijärv is close to Pühajärv, a larger lake, and it is part of the Pühajärve resort area, near the "winter capital" of Otepää. An area of great natural beauty, it is a popular holiday resort location.

== Physical description ==
The lake has an area of 8.0 hectares (20 acres). The lake has a maximum depth of 1.2 meters (3 ft 11 in). It is 400 meters (1,300 ft) long, and its shoreline measures 1,330 meters (4,360 ft).

== See also ==
- List of lakes of Estonia
