= Hen =

Hen commonly refers to a female animal: a female chicken, other gallinaceous bird, any type of bird in general, or a lobster. It is also a slang term for a woman.

Hen, HEN or Hens may also refer to:

== Arts and media ==
- Hen (film), 2025
- Hen (manga), 1988, created by Hiroya Oku
- Hallmark Entertainment Network, abbreviated "HEN"
- Symphony No. 83 (Haydn), nicknamed "The Hen"

== Names ==
- Hen (name), a given name and surname
- Henry (given name), sometimes abbreviated "Hen."

== Places ==
=== Norway ===
- Hen, Buskerud, a village in Ringerike Municipality in Buskerud county
- Hen Church, a church in Rauma Municipality in Møre og Romsdal county
- Hen Municipality, a former municipality in Møre og Romsdal county

=== United Kingdom ===
- Hazel Brook or Hen, a stream in Bristol, England
- Hen Cliff, on the Isle of Purbeck, Dorset, England
- Hendon railway station, England (station code "HEN")

=== Elsewhere ===
- Hen Island (disambiguation)
- Hen and Chicken Islands, New Zealand
- Henan, a province of China (Guobiao abbreviation HEN)

== Other uses ==
- Hen (pronoun), a Swedish gender-neutral pronoun
- FNIX–SCOM–Hengxiang Cycling Team (UCI team code "HEN")

== See also ==
- Hehn
- Henn
- Henpecked
- Rooster, a male chicken or related bird
