= Ada Limón =

American poet (born 1976)

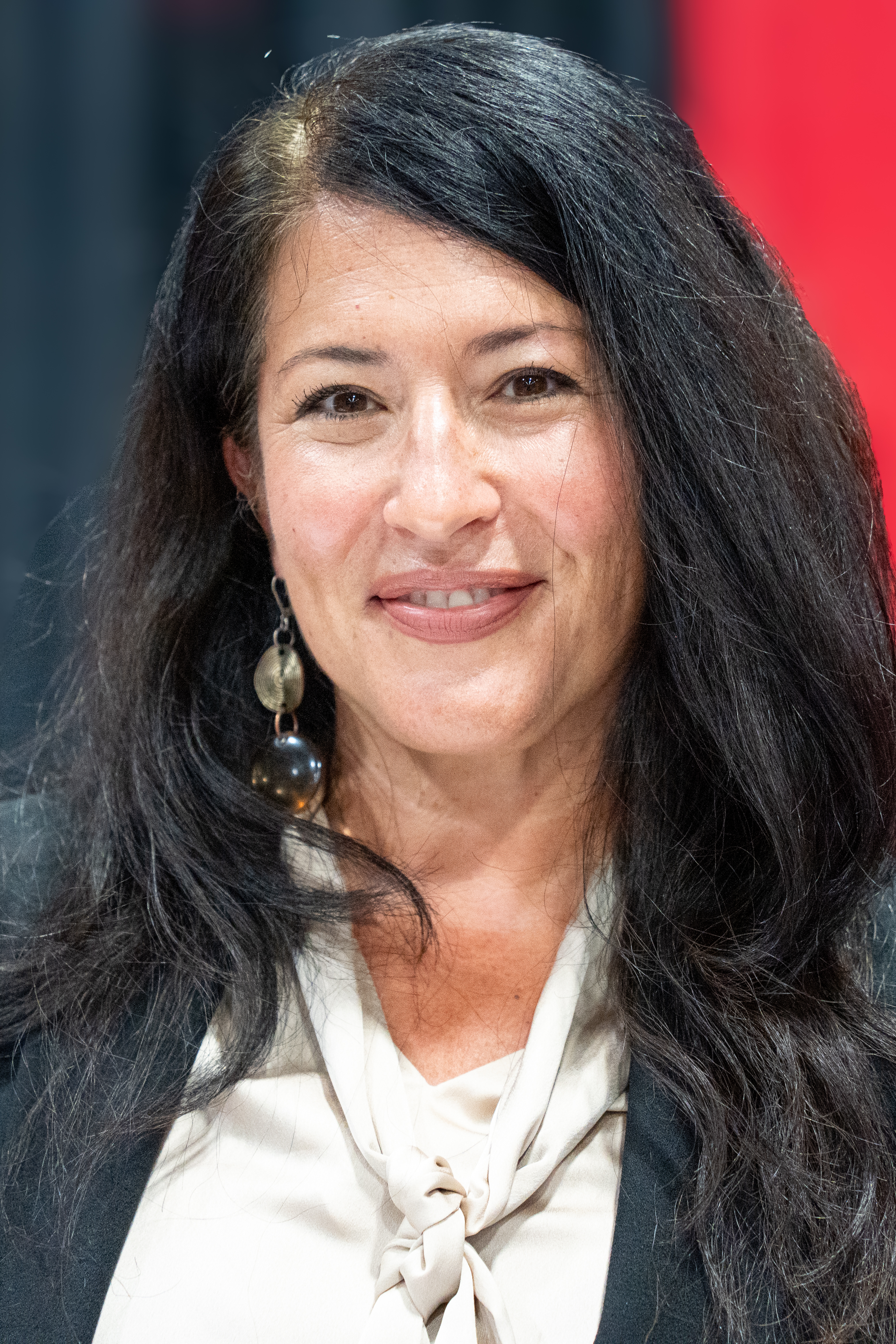
- Limón at the National Book Festival 2025
- Born: March 28, 1976 (age 50); Sonoma, California, U.S.
- Education: University of Washington (BFA); New York University (MFA)
- Spouse: Lucas Marquardt
- Writing career
- Genre: Poetry
- Notable awards: National Book Critics Circle Award

United States Poet Laureate
- In office 2022–2025
- Preceded by: Joy Harjo
- Succeeded by: Arthur Sze
- Website: adalimon.com

Ada Limón (born March 28, 1976) is an American poet. On July 12, 2022, she was named the 24th United States poet laureate by the Librarian of Congress. This made her the first Latina to be Poet Laureate of the United States. She is married to Lucas Marquardt.

== Early life and education ==
Limón, who is Mexican-American, grew up in Sonoma, California. She is the daughter of Ken Limón and Stacia Brady; Brady often provides the cover art for Limón's books.

Limón says she developed a love for poetry in high school, despite dedicating her extracurricular activities to theatrical productions. She attended the drama school at the University of Washington. After taking writing courses from professors including Colleen J. McElroy, she went on to receive her MFA from New York University in 2001, where she studied with Sharon Olds, Philip Levine, Marie Howe, Mark Doty, Agha Shahid Ali, and Tom Sleigh.

Upon graduation, Limón received a fellowship to live and write at the Fine Arts Work Center in Provincetown, Massachusetts. In 2003, she received a grant from the New York Foundation for the Arts, and in the same year won the Chicago Literary Award for Poetry.

To support her writing career, Limón began working in marketing for Condé Nast. She quit this job following her stepmother's untimely death, which was a catalyst for Limón to decide to pursue her writing career before it was too late.

== Career ==
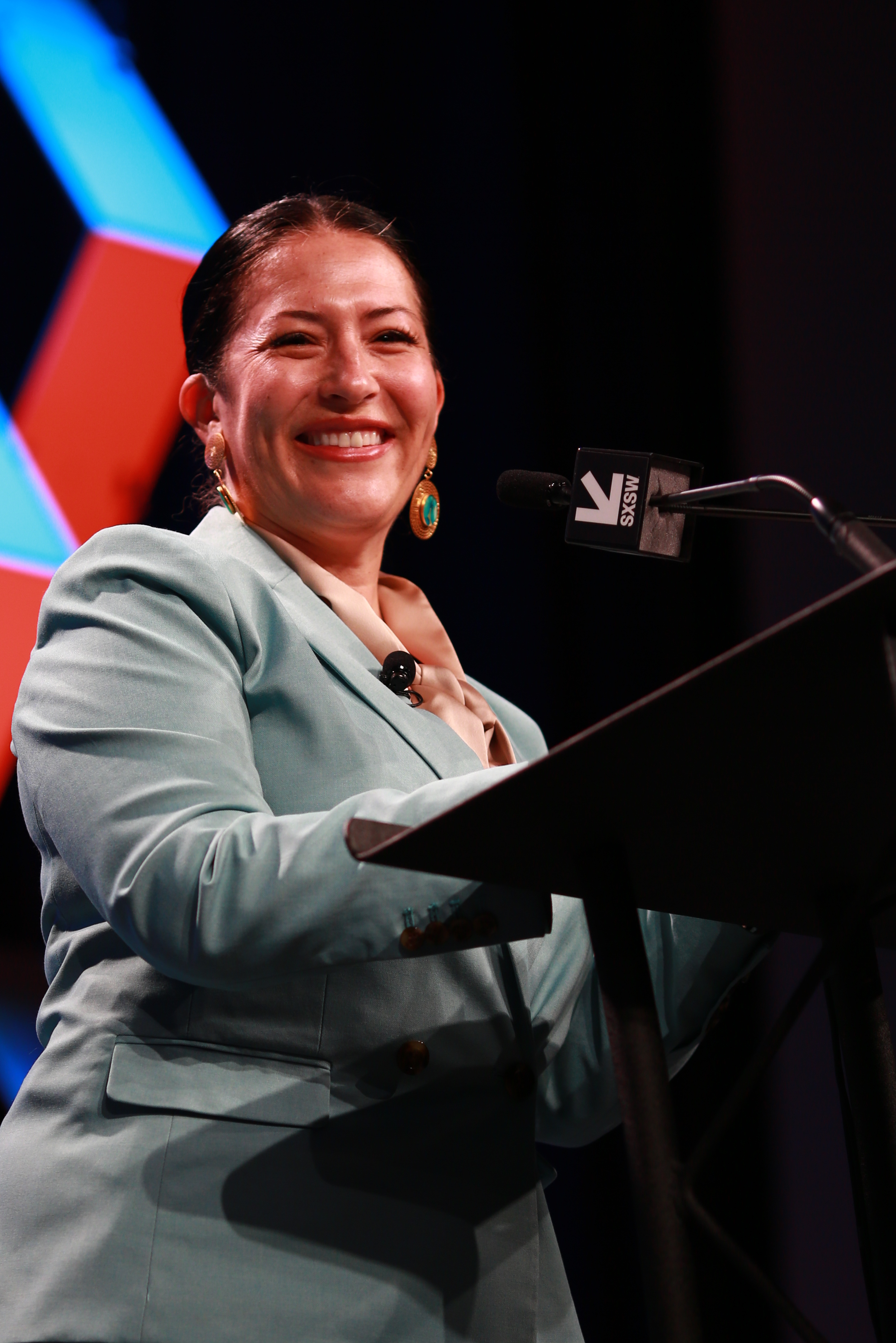
Limón at SXSW Interactive in 2024, talking about her work with NASA

After 12 years in New York City, where she worked for various magazines such as Martha Stewart Living, GQ, and Travel + Leisure, Limón now lives in both Lexington, Kentucky and Sonoma, California, where she writes and teaches.

Limón's first book, Lucky Wreck, was chosen by Jean Valentine as the winner of the Autumn House Poetry Prize in 2005, while her second book, This Big Fake World, was the winner of the Pearl Poetry Prize in 2006. The two books came out within less than a year of each other. In a 2014 article in Compose magazine, she stated: "I went from having no books at all, to having two in the span of a year. I felt like I had won the lottery, well, without the money. I suppose, in my life, I've never done things the ordinary way. I'm either deep in the bottom of the well or nowhere near water." She serves on the faculty of Queens University of Charlotte low-residency M.F.A. program, and the "24 Pearl Street" online program for the Provincetown Fine Arts Work Center.

When her third book, Sharks in the Rivers (Milkweed Editions, 2010) was released, a reviewer writing in The Brooklyn Rail observed: "Unlike much contemporary poetry, Limón's work isn't text-derivative or deconstructivist. She personalizes her homilies, stamping them with the authenticity of invention and self-discovery." Limón's fourth book, Bright Dead Things, was released in 2015. She was shortlisted as a finalist for the 2015 National Book Award for Poetry. Her 2018 book, The Carrying, subsequently won a National Book Critics Circle Award.

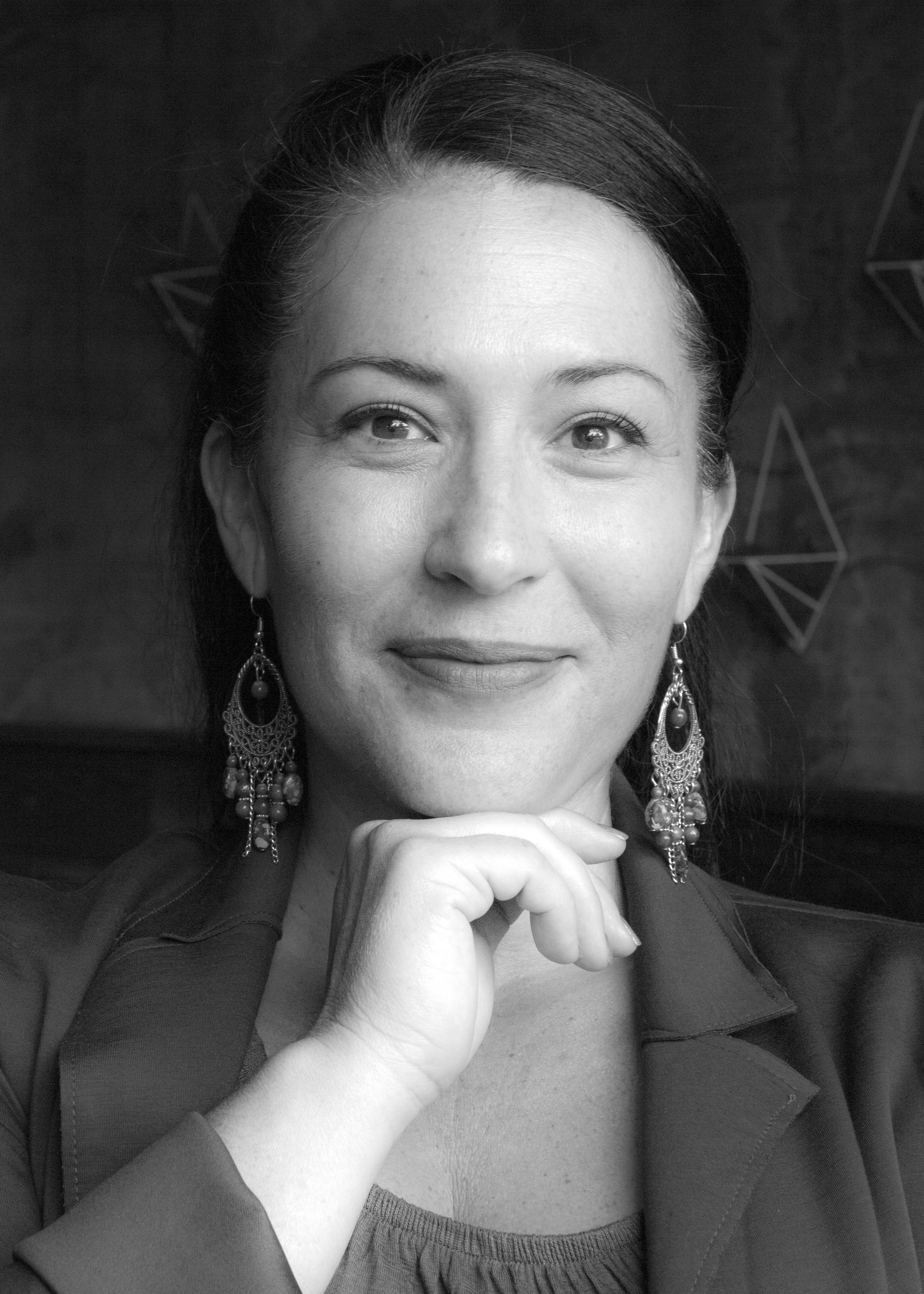
Limón in 2019

Her poem "State Bird" appeared in the June 2, 2014, issue of The New Yorker, and her poem "How to Triumph Like a Girl" (2013), which portrays different aspects of female horses, was awarded the 2015 Pushcart Prize. Her work has also appeared in the Harvard Review and the Pleiades.

Limón was appointed 24th Poet Laureate Consultant in Poetry by Librarian of Congress Carla Hayden in 2022 and reappointed for a second, two-year term in 2023.

As part of her laureateship, she wrote an original poem, "In Praise of Mystery: A Poem for Europa," dedicated to NASA's Europa Clipper mission, which debuted on June 1, 2023. The poem is engraved in her own handwriting on a metal plate affixed to the Europa Clipper spacecraft. The Europa Clipper launched on October 14, 2024, and is expected to arrive in the Jupiter system in 2030, where it will perform flybys of Jupiter's Galilean moon, Europa.

Her project as poet laureate was the "You Are Here" project which consisted of a poetry collection (You Are Here: Poetry and the Natural World), an installation of picnic tables in cooperation with the National Park Service (You Are Here: Poetry in Parks), and a call for responses to the question "What would you write in response to the landscape around you?" via the hashtag #youareherepoetry. She stated, "In conceiving of the project, I wanted something that could both praise our sacred and natural wonders and also speak the complex truths of this urgent time."

She has been a beneficiary of the Kentucky Foundation for Women.

== Awards and honors ==
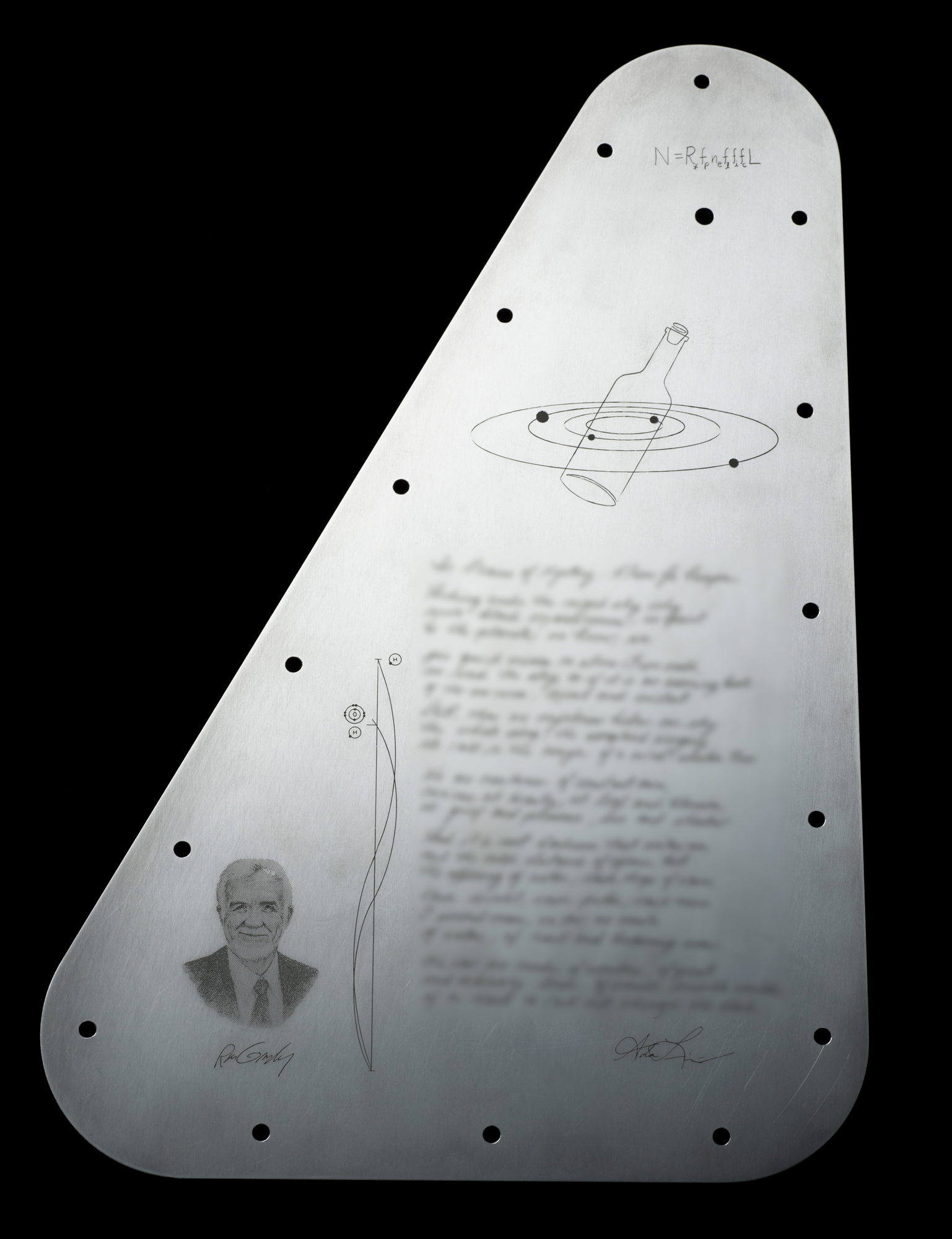
This side of a commemorative plate mounted on NASA's Europa Clipper spacecraft features Limón's handwritten "In Praise of Mystery: A Poem for Europa" (blurred out for copyright reasons)

In 2013, Limón served as a judge for the National Book Award for Poetry.

In 2020, Limón was awarded a Fellowship from the John Simon Guggenheim Memorial Foundation.

In July 2022, Librarian of Congress Carla Hayden appointed her the 24th United States Poet Laureate for the term of 2022–2023. Hayden renewed Limón's term for another two years in April 2023.

In October 2023, she was named a MacArthur Fellow receiving the "genius" grant from the John and Catherine T. MacArthur Foundation.

She received a 2023 PEN Oakland/Josephine Miles Award for The Hurting Kind.

In February 2024, Limón was named as one of Time magazine's 12 Women of the Year for 2024, for being "extraordinary leaders who are working toward a more equal world".

Dr. Thayer Wescott's 2025 study To Write of This Country and Reckon with America through Contemporary Women Poets included Ada Limón among ten contemporary poets identified as shaping twenty-first-century American poetry, alongside writers such as Joy Harjo, Sheema Kalbasi, Tracy K. Smith and others.

To raise public awareness of the Europa Clipper mission, NASA undertook a "Message In A Bottle" campaign, i.e. actually "Send Your Name to Europa" campaign on June 1, 2023, through which people around the world are invited to send their names as signatories to a poem called, "In Praise of Mystery: A Poem for Europa" written by Ada Limón. The poem connects the two water worlds — Earth, yearning to reach out and understand what makes a world habitable, and Europa, waiting with secrets yet to be explored. The poem is engraved on a tantalum metal plate that seals an opening into the vault. The inward-facing side of the metal plate is engraved with the poem in the poet's own handwriting, along with participants' names that will be etched onto microchips mounted on the spacecraft.

On Friday, August 18, 2023, the City of Sonoma paid tribute to Limón, with a Bench Dedication. The bench is adorned with quotes from Limón's work and is situated in front of Readers' Books in Sonoma.

Year	Title	Award	Result	Ref.
2005	Lucky Wreck	Autumn House Poetry Prize	Winner	
2006	This Big Fake World	Pearl Poetry Prize	Winner	
2015	Bright Dead Things	National Book Award for Poetry	Finalist	
2015	Bright Dead Things	National Book Critics Circle Award for Poetry	Finalist	
2018	The Carrying	National Book Critics Circle Award for Poetry	Winner	
2019	The Carrying	PEN/Jean Stein Book Award	Finalist	
2023	The Hurting Kind	Griffin Poetry Prize	Finalist	
2023	The Hurting Kind	PEN Oakland/Josephine Miles Award	Winner	

== Bibliography ==
=== Poetry ===
==== Collections ====
- Lucky Wreck, Autumn House Press, 2006, ISBN 978-1-932870-08-4
- This Big Fake World, Pearl Editions, 2006, ISBN 978-1-888219-35-7
- Sharks in the Rivers, Milkweed Editions, 2010, ISBN 978-1-57131-438-3
- Bright Dead Things, Milkweed Editions, 2015, ISBN 978-1-57131-925-8
- The Carrying, Milkweed Editions, 2018, ISBN 978-1-57131-512-0
- The Hurting Kind, Milkweed Editions, 2022, ISBN 978-1-63955-049-4
- Shelter: A Love Letter To Trees, Scribd Originals, 2022, ISBN 978-1-09444-438-3
- You Are Here, Milkweed Editions, 2024, ISBN 978-1-57131-568-7
- Startlement, Milkweed Editions, 2025, ISBN 978-1-63955-051-7

==== Children's books ====
- In Praise of Mystery, Norton Young Readers, 2024, ISBN 978-1-324-05400-9
- And, Too, The Fox, Lerner Publishing, 2025, ISBN 979-8-7656-3925-2

==== Chapbooks ====
- 99¢ Heart, Big Game Books, 2007
- What Sucks Us In Will Surely Swallow Us Whole, Cinematheque Press, 2009

=== Selected poems ===
Year	Title	First published	Reprinted/collected
2009	Crush	Limón, Ada (June 1, 2009). "Crush". The New Yorker.	
2010	Overjoyed	Limón, Ada (June 7, 2010). "Overjoyed". Harvard Review.	
2010	Sharks in the rivers	Limón, Ada (2010). Sharks in the rivers. Milkweed Editions. ISBN 978-1-57131-438-3.	
2014	State Bird	Limón, Ada (June 2, 2014). "State Bird". The New Yorker. Vol. 90, no. 15. p. 30.	
2017	The Burying Beetle	Limón, Ada (February 27, 2017). "The Burying Beetle". The New Yorker. Vol. 93, no. 2. p. 39.	
2017	Overpass	Limón, Ada (December 4, 2017). "Overpass". The New Yorker. Vol. 93, no. 39. p. 27.	
2021	Privacy	Limón, Ada (March 22, 2021). "Privacy". The New Yorker. Vol. 97, no. 5. p. 51.	
