= Christopher Collins (disambiguation) =

Christopher Collins, also known as Chris Latta (1949–1994), was an American actor, voice artist and comedian.

Christopher Collins may also refer to:

- Christopher Collins (cricketer) (1859–1919), English cricketer
- Christopher Graham Collins, birth name of the British comedian Frank Skinner
- Christopher Henn-Collins (1915–2006), British soldier and inventor

== See also ==
- Chris Collins (disambiguation)
- Collins (disambiguation)
