= Hehn =

Hehn is a surname. Notable people with the surname include:

- Carl Hehn (1821–1875), Baltic German agricultural scientist
- Hans-Jürgen Hehn (born 1944), German fencer
- Keri Hehn (born 1981), American swimmer
- Paul N. Hehn, American historian
- Sascha Hehn (born 1954), German actor

== Places ==
- Hehn, a quarter of the city of Mönchengladbach, Germany

== See also ==
- Hen and Henn
