= Marsh hen =

Marsh hen may refer to:

- Marsh Hen, an American sailboat design
- Marsh Hen Mill, an American company
- Moorhen, sometimes called a marsh hen, a species of bird

== See also ==
- Marshbird
- Marsh (disambiguation)
- Hen (disambiguation)
