= Otepää =

Town in Estonia

- Town
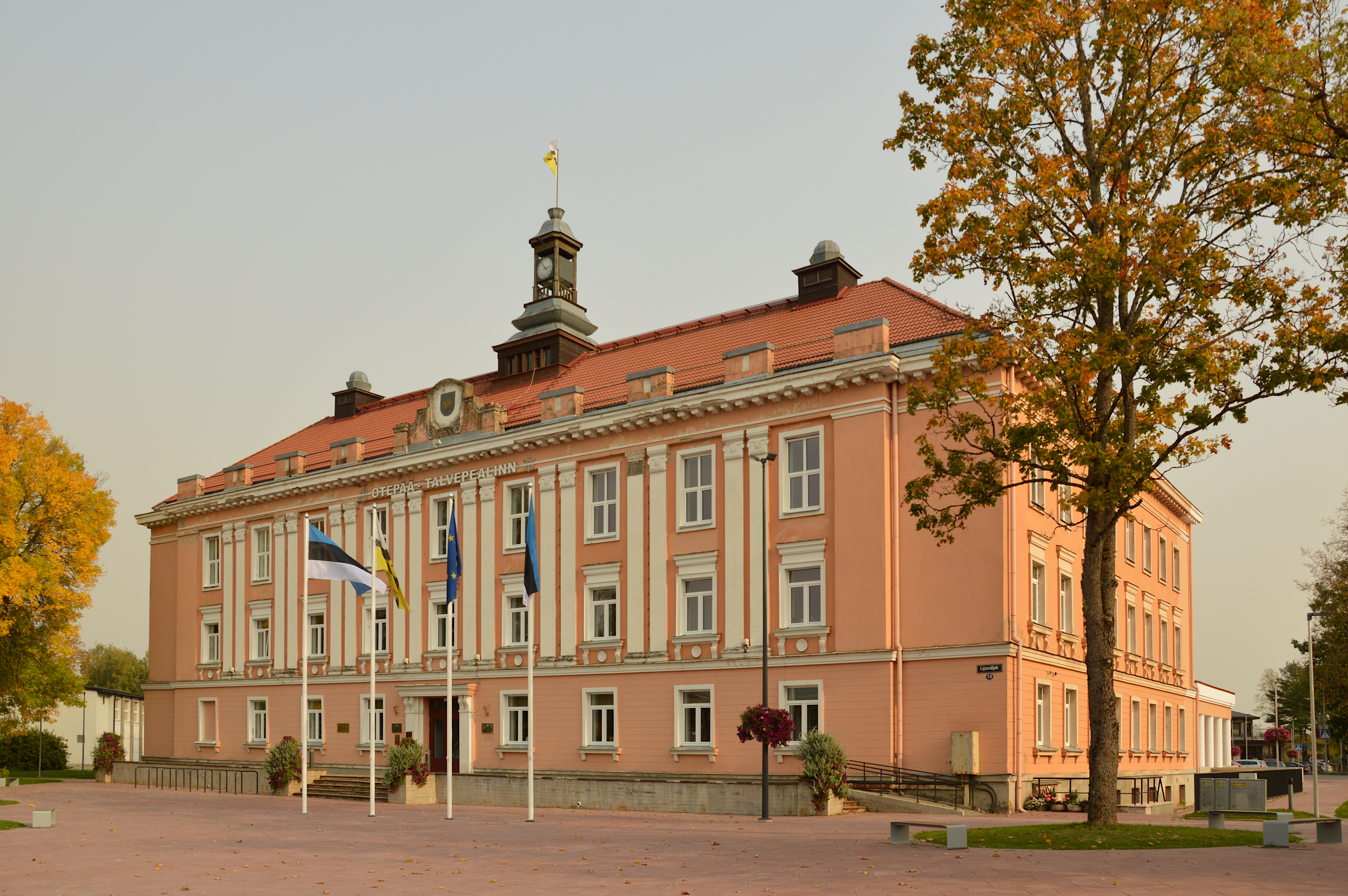
- Otepää Town Hall

- Location in Estonia
- Coordinates: 58°03′34″N 26°29′45″E
- Country: Estonia
- County: Valga County
- Municipality: Otepää Parish

Population (2024)
  - Total: 2,155
  - Rank: 35th
- Time zone: UTC+2 (EET)
  - Summer (DST): UTC+3 (EEST)

Otepää (formerly Nuustaku) is a town in Valga County, southern Estonia. It is the administrative centre of Otepää Parish. Otepää is a popular skiing resort, popularly known as the "winter capital" of Estonia (in contrast to the "summer capital" Pärnu). During the 2005–2006 season it became the site for FIS Cross-Country World Cup events.

The name Otepää means 'Ott's Head' in South Estonian, where ott is a euphemism for 'bear'.

== History ==
The first settlement in Otepää was in the 6th century BC. It has been inhabited continuously since the 6th-7th centuries. Otepää (or Odenpäh) was historically important as the site of an Ugandi County hill fort and medieval castle.

The fortress was first mentioned in Rus' sources in 1116 when the princes of Novgorod and Pskov undertook an expedition against Tartu and Otepää.

The conquest of Estonia during the Northern Crusades began with an attack on the fortress at Otepää in 1208. The fort was attacked again in 1217, when Christianized southern Estonians stopped the Kievan Rus' advances.

The fort at Otepää was finally conquered in 1224 by German crusaders. Hermann of Dorpat, the first Prince-Bishop of the Bishopric of Dorpat (1224–1248) within the Livonian Confederation, built an episcopal castle at Otepää, which was the first stone fortress built in Estonia.

During the 14th century the importance of Otepää waned as Tartu, which was the seat of the Bishopric, grew in importance. The castle at Otepää was destroyed, but there is no written evidence of when the castle was abandoned. Archaeologists have argued that the castle was inhabited as late as 1477. It is more commonly believed that the castle was razed by the Livonian Order in 1396 during a conflict with the Bishopric of Dorpat.

The earliest surviving firearm in Europe was found in the castle of Otepää and dates to at least 1396.

In 1862, the settlement was named Nuustaku and granted town privileges. In 1876, the Tartu Estonian Farmers' Society and the Estonian Farmers' Society held the first agricultural fair at Nuustaku church manor. On June 4, 1884, the flag that was to become the national flag of Estonia was dedicated in the Nuustaku Church as the flag of the Estonian Students' Society. The name Nuustaku was changed to Otepää in 1922. Otepää officially became a town in 1936.

Otepää St. Mary's Church is located in the town. During the Middle Ages, it is known to have had three sacred buildings. The oldest parts of current church building dates back to 1860s. Major re-building took place 1889–1890 (architect R. Guleke).

== Geography ==
Otepää is situated in a region known as the Otepää Upland. Otepää is located the highest of the Estonian cities, up to 171 meters above sea level. The area is hilly and contains numerous lakes, including Lake Pühajärv.

== Demographics ==
Population of the town of Otepää.
Year	Population
1959	2,158
1970	2,424
1979	2,289
1989	2,424
2000	2,219
2011	1,953
2018	2,167

== Government and politics ==
Otepää's municipal status was briefly restored in 1989 when the local government re-emerged in Estonia. In 1999, Otepää City was merged with the Pühajärve rural municipality, which became known as the Otepää Rural Municipality. At the present time Otepää Parish is the local government administrative unit that governs Otepää City.

== Gallery ==
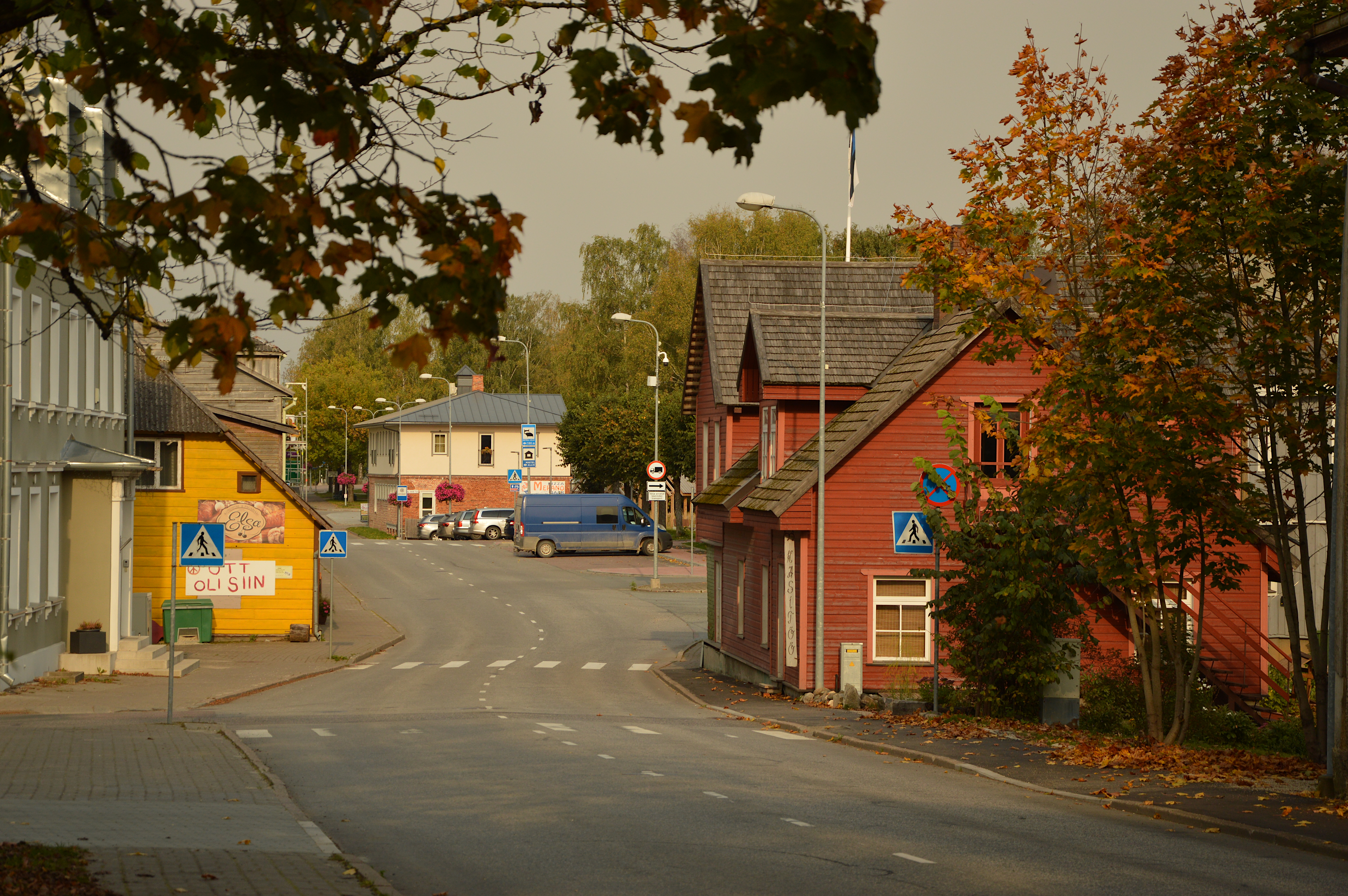
Town center

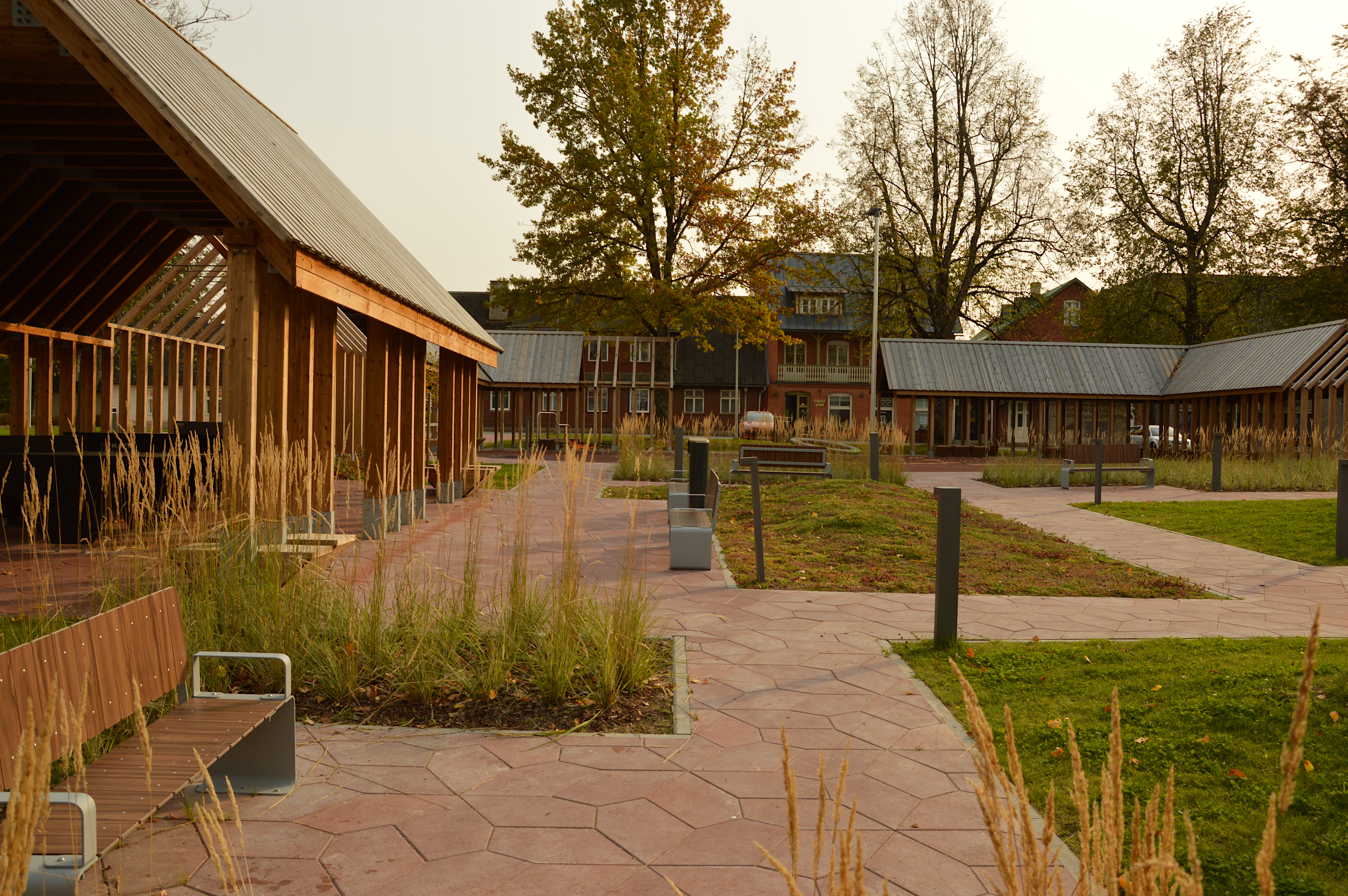
Otepää central square

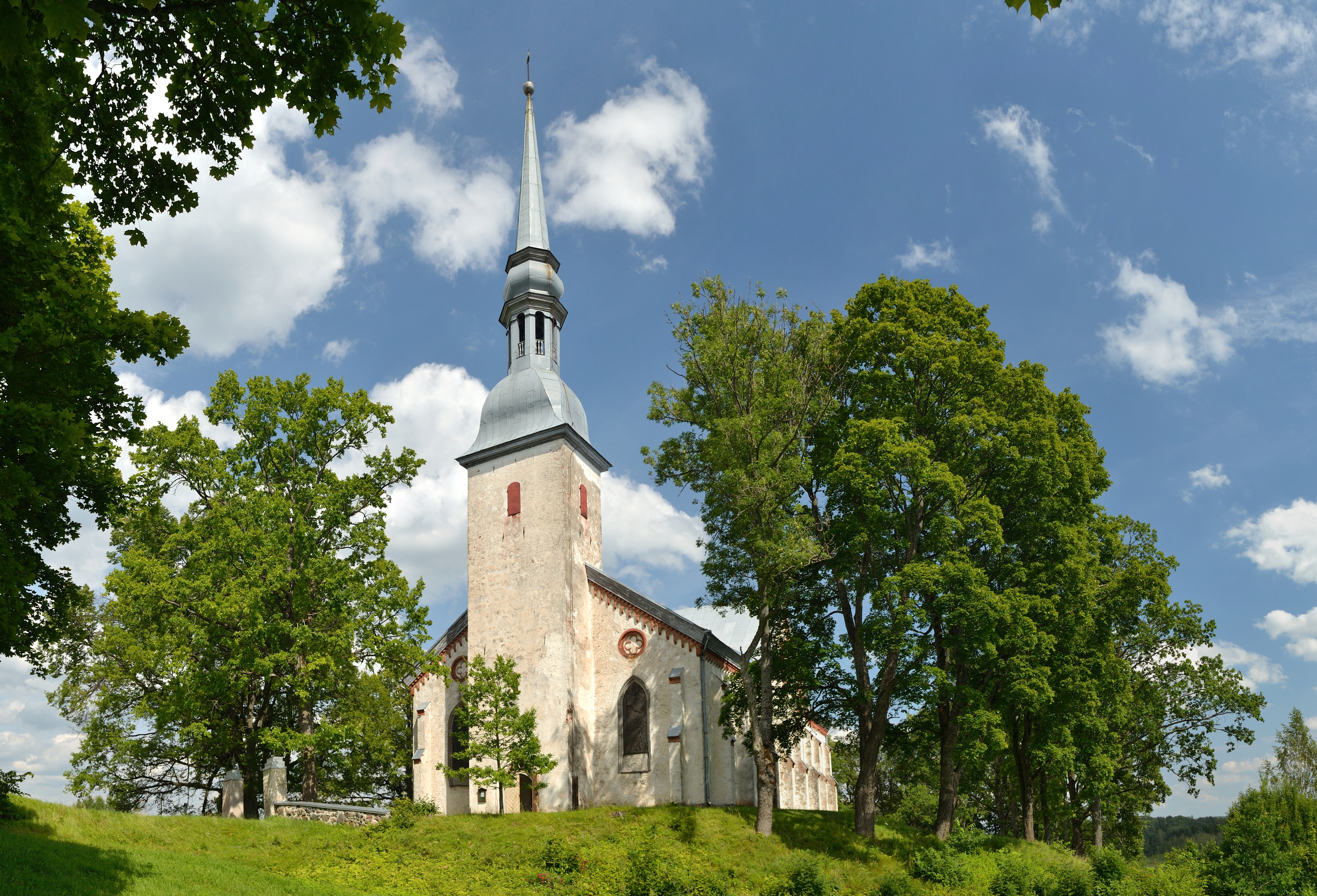
Otepää St. Mary's Church

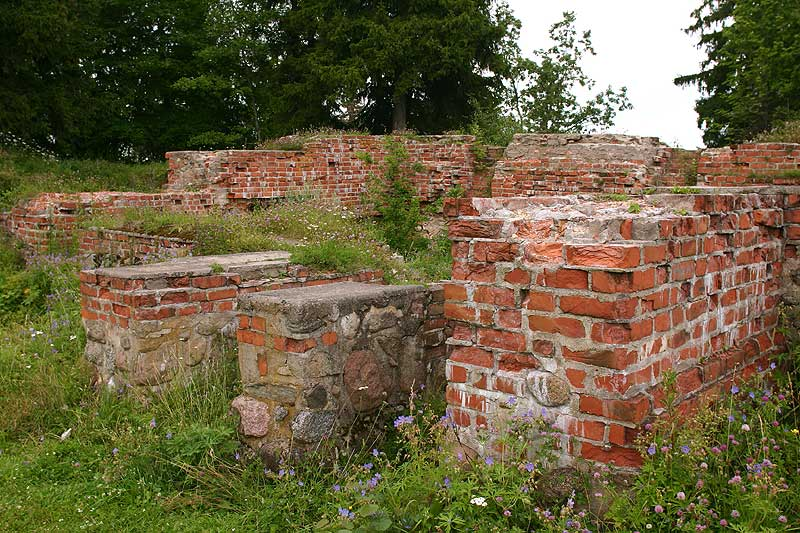
Ruins of Otepää Bishop castle

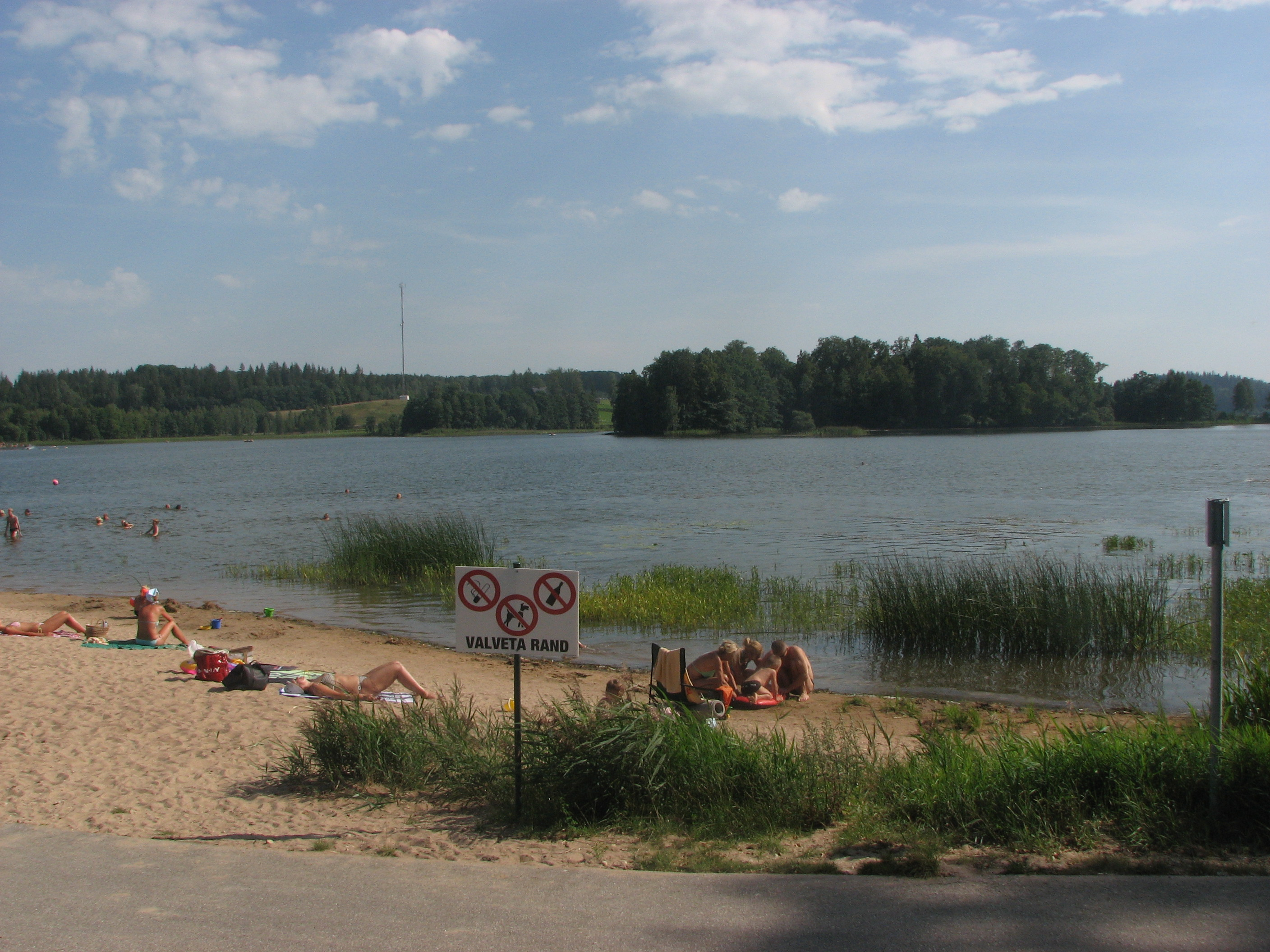
The beach of Lake Pühajärv in Otepää.

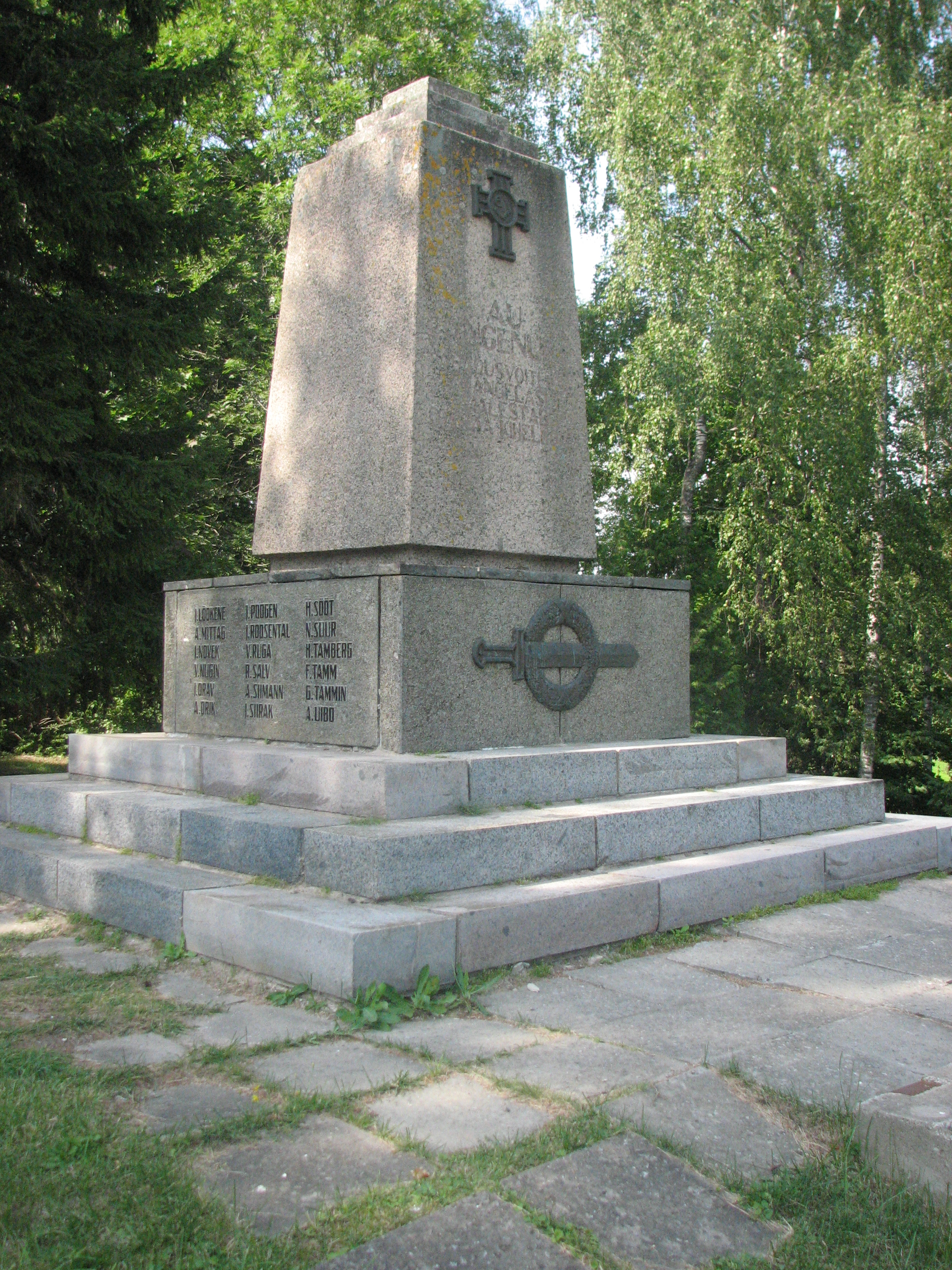
Monument of Estonian War of Independence

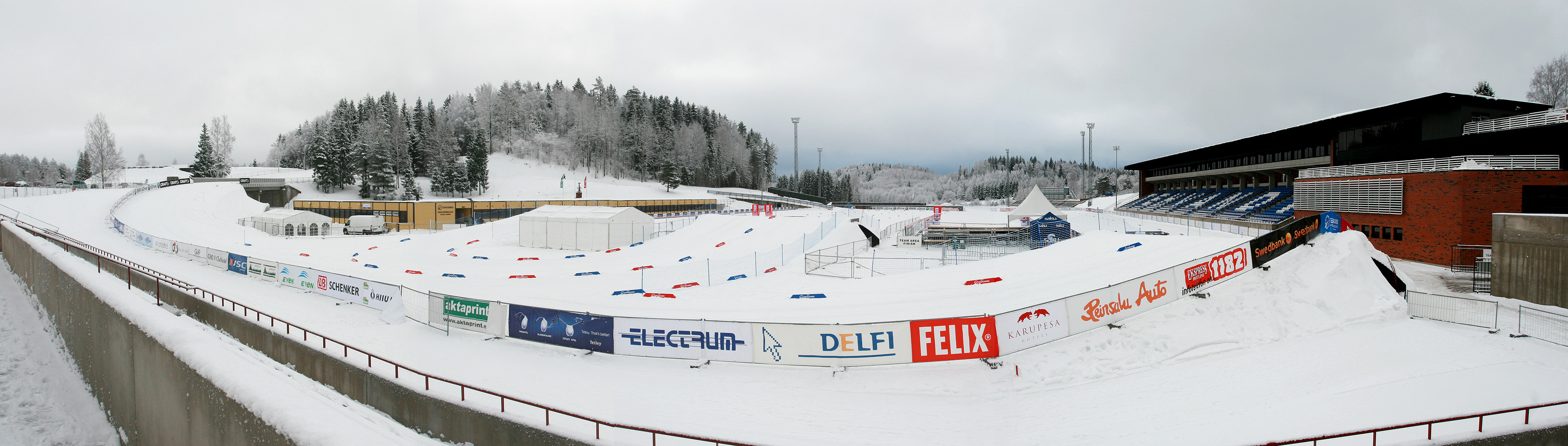
Tehvandi skiing stadium

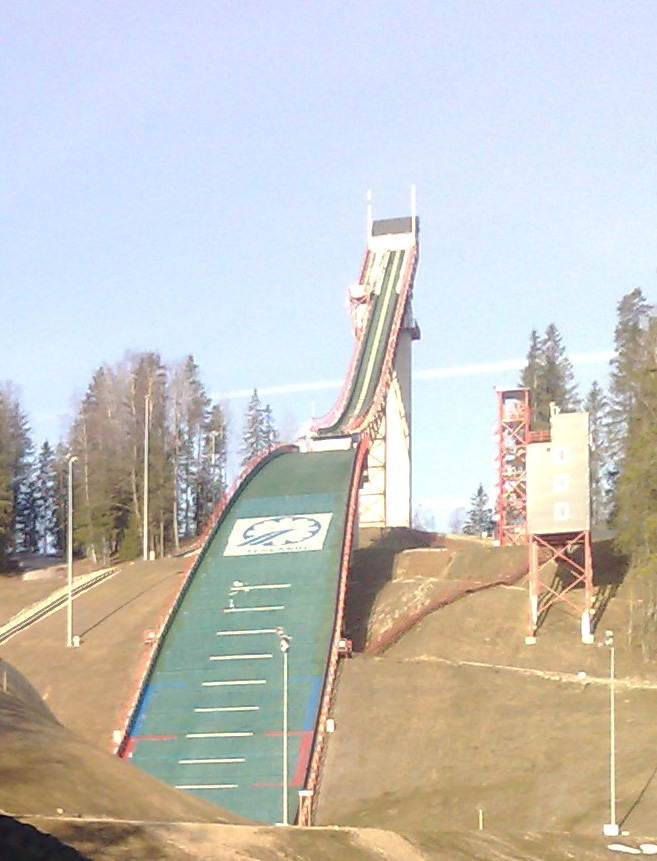
Tehvandi ski jumping hill

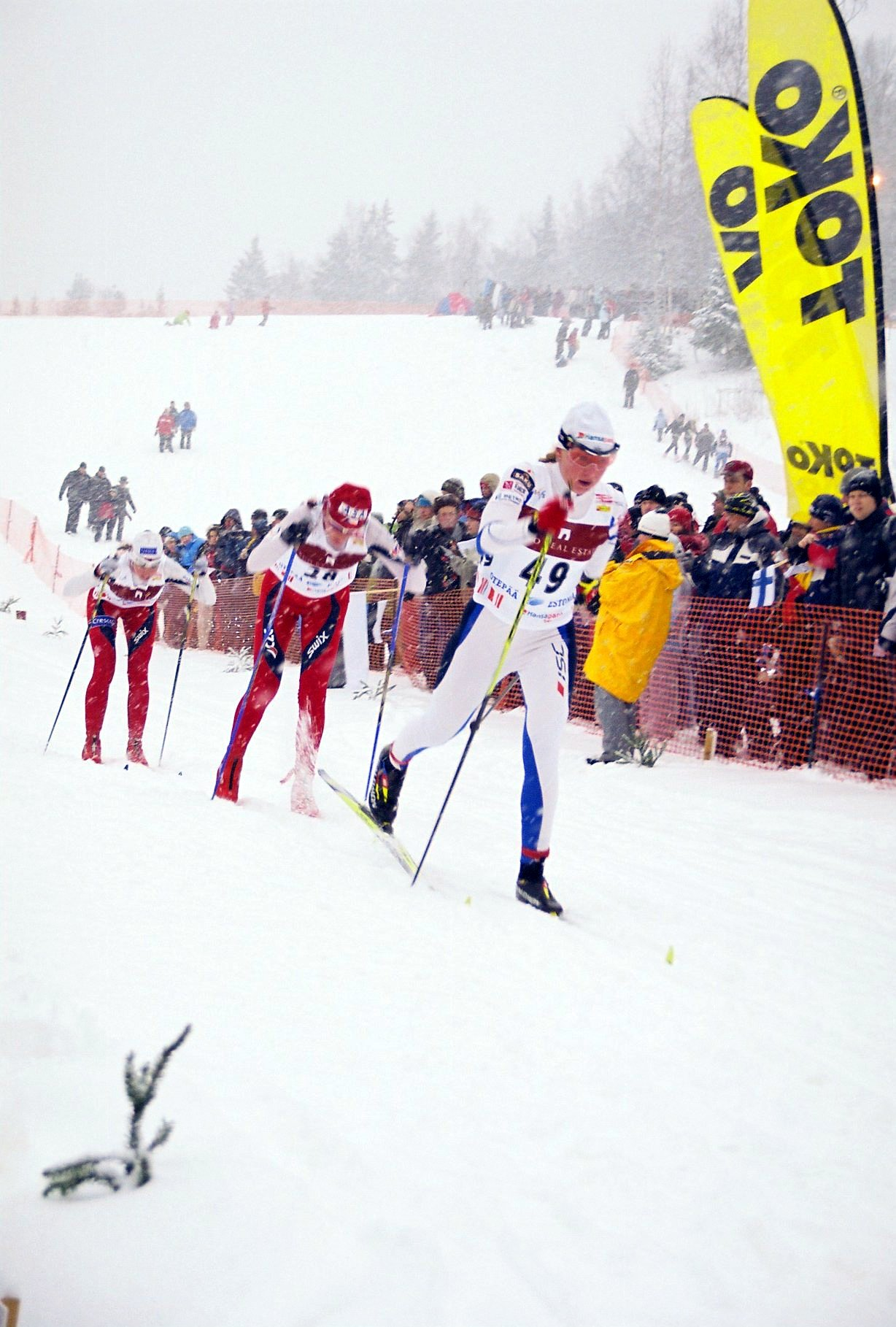
2006–07 FIS Cross-Country World Cup, Kristina Šmigun in the focus.

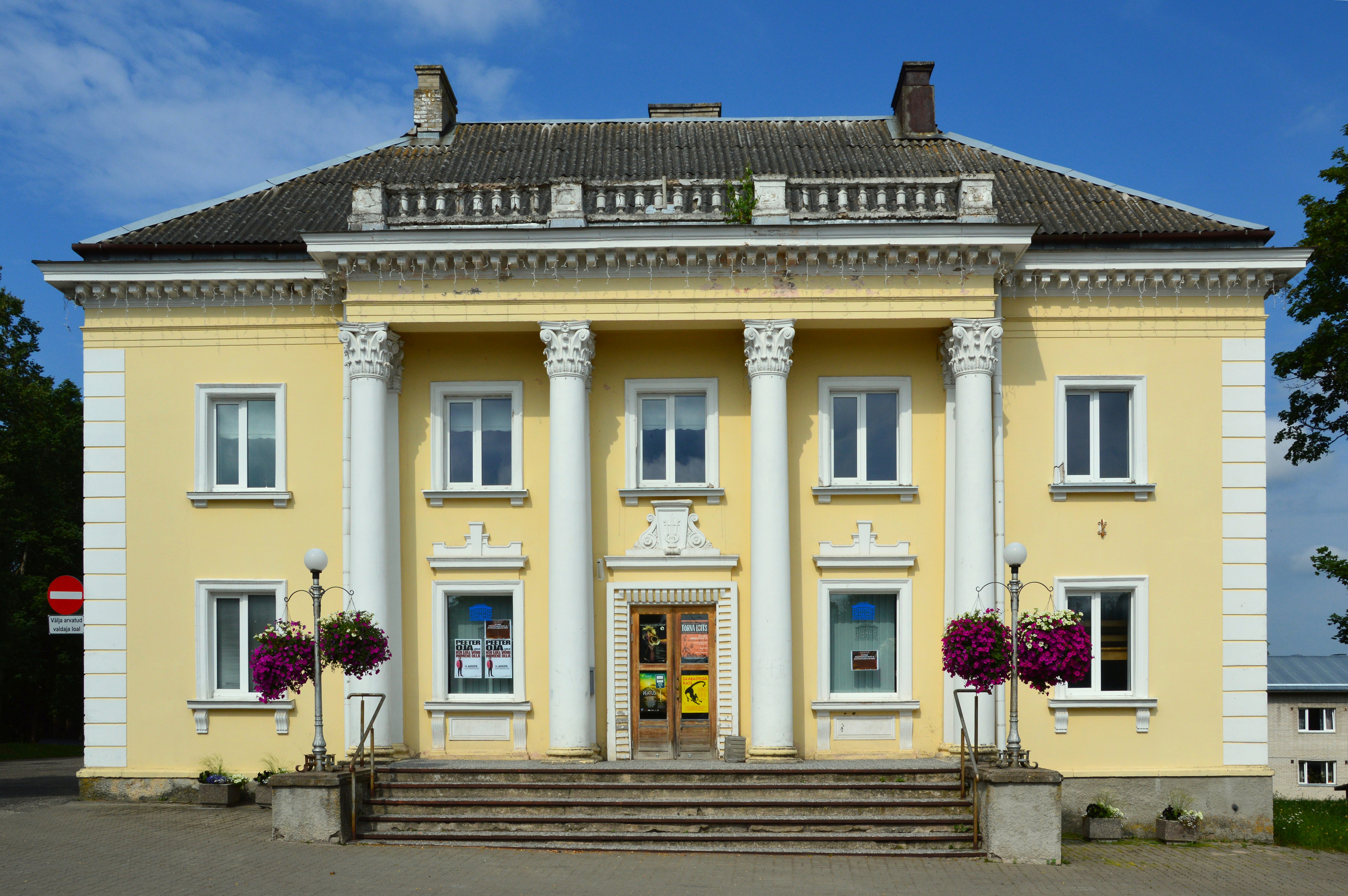
Otepää House of Culture

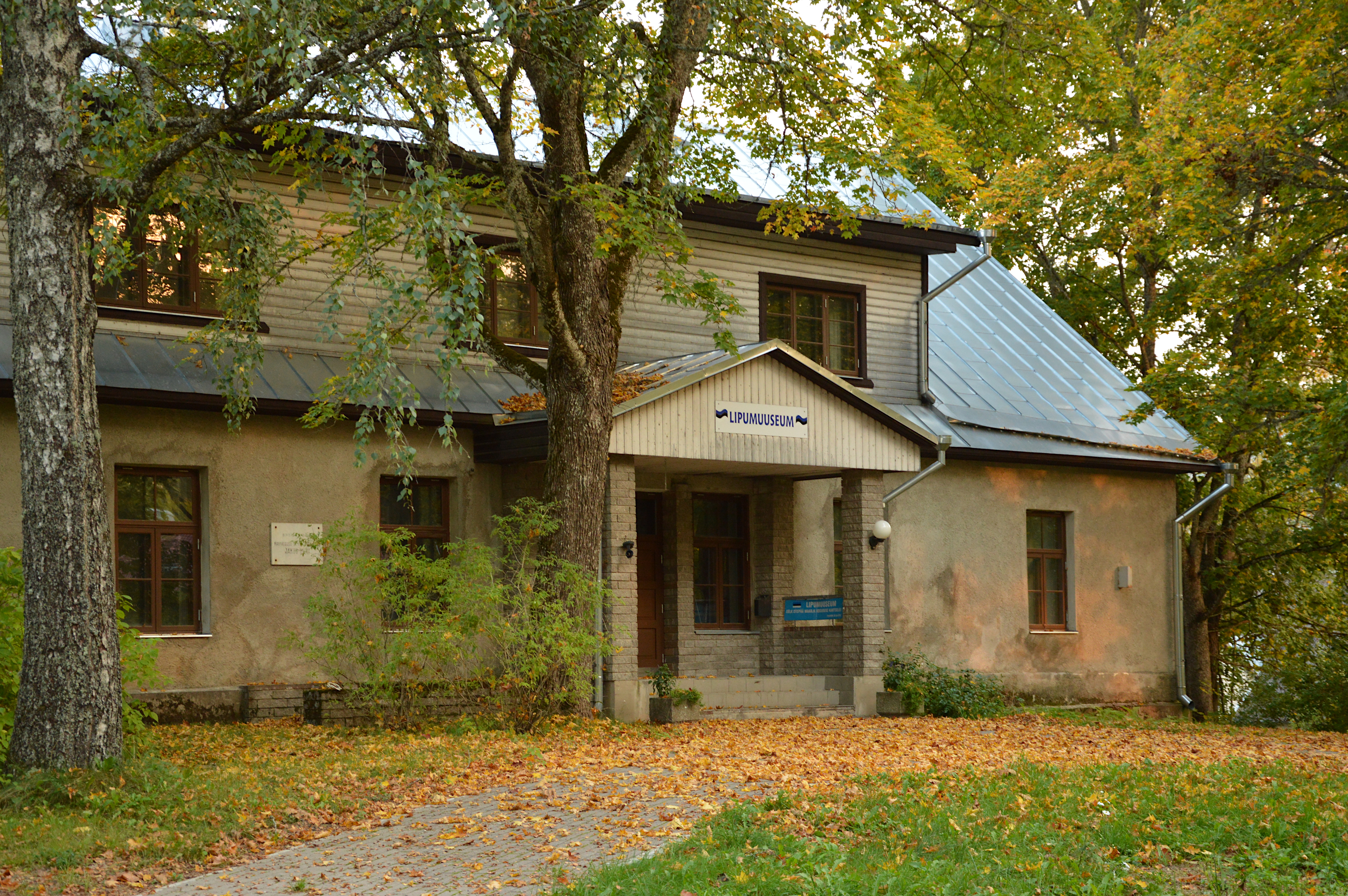
Otepää rectory and flag museum

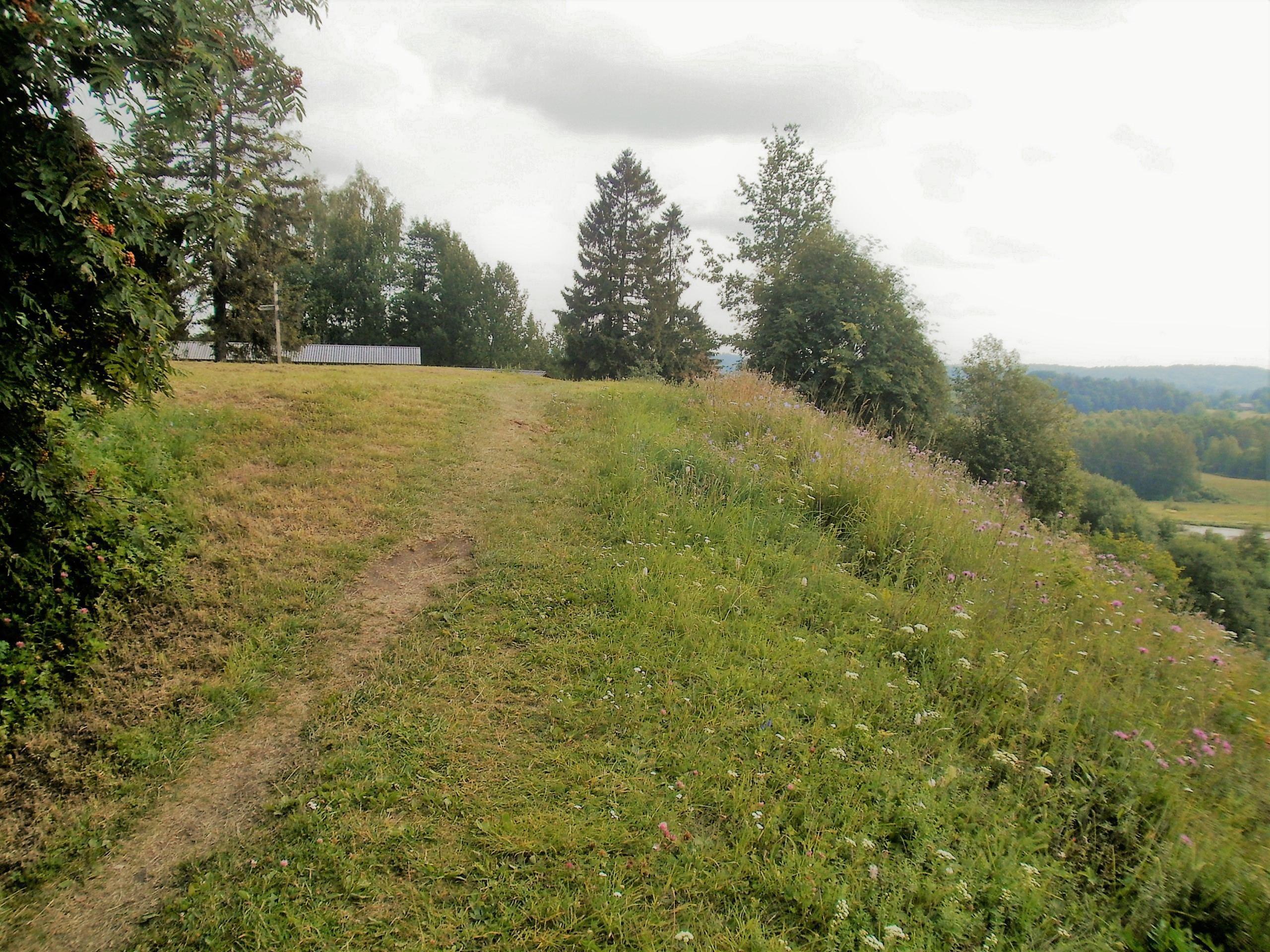
Otepää castle hill

== Notable people ==
- Carl Hehn (1821 – 1875), a Baltic German agricultural scientist, founded the Baltic Forest Society in 1865.
- Urmas Ott (1955 – 2008), TV and radio journalist
- Jaan Undusk (born 1958), writer, playwright and literary scholar.
- Rando Pettai (born 1965), film director, film producer, caricaturist and cartoonist.
- Andrus Veerpalu (born 1971), skier, Olympic cold medalist.

== See also ==
- Tartu Maraton
- Tehvandi Sports Center
