= The Hurting Kind =

2022 collection of poetry by Ada Limón

- First edition
- Author: Ada Limón
- Genre: Poetry
- Publisher: Milkweed Editions
- Publication date: 2022

The Hurting Kind is a 2022 collection of poetry by Ada Limón. The collection was published by Milkweed Editions.

== Conception and writing ==
Limón deliberately avoided creating a collection with a "narrative arc". Instead, Limón organized the poems into sections corresponding to the four seasons. Some of the poems in the collection were written during isolation induced by the COVID-19 pandemic, and were sent by Limón as "gifts" to people she could not see in person prior to publication in The Hurting Kind. Limón has characterized the collection as an answer to "the question of family: What is it to be connected to everything?".

Limón has said her non-fiction book, Shelter, also published in 2022, "feel[s]" to her like a "companion piece" to The Hurting Kind.

== Reception ==
In a review of the collection published by The New York Times, poet and critic Craig Morgan Teicher praised Limón’s "powerfully observant eye" and wrote that among the poems were "a handful of genuine masterpieces". Teicher noted these positive elements helped reduce the importance of some "little qualms" he had with the collection, including the premature "sentimental" or "overly hopeful" endings to some poems.

Writing in a review published by the Poetry Foundation, Kathleen Rooney praised the collection as possessing a "shimmer" as described by Deborah Bird Rose. Rooney characterized Rose's definition of "shimmer" as "the radiant pulse of life across ecologies".
