= Steve Henn =

American poet

- Born: February 19, 1976 (age 50)
- Occupations: Author; poet; editor; teacher
- Website: therealstevehenn.com//

Steve Henn (born February 19, 1976) is an American poet and editor, author of five books of poetry and several chapbooks.

== Biography ==
Steve Henn grew up in Warsaw, Indiana, and graduated from Warsaw Community High School. He completed his bachelor of arts in English at Indiana University South Bend, where he studied creative writing with David Dodd Lee. He currently teaches English at Warsaw Community High School.

== Poetry and editing ==
Henn is the author of five full-length books of poems and several chapbooks. His first two books were published by NYQ Books. He has published poems in many literary journals, including Rattle, The Chiron Review, Nerve Cowboy, Midwestern Gothic, Pearl, 5 AM, and Misfit Magazine. For several years he edited and published the literary magazine Fight These Bastards with co-founders Don Winter and Oren Wagner.

In a review of Henn's second book, And God Said: Let there be Evolution! (NYQ Books 2012), the editors of NUVO write that "Henn pokes fun at everything on the American scene from the certainties of televangelist Pat Robertson and his ilk to the way in which high-minded academic institutions dominate contemporary poetry." They state that "Henn is at his best when he's at his most generous," illustrating their view with reference to "Letter to a student, just before the Census, 2010": "he asks the question to a high school student of his, 'Lisa, in essence, are you not immeasurable?' It's a poem that successfully merges a jaded world view with hopeful sentiment."

Henn's third book, Indiana Noble Sad Man of the Year (Wolfson Press 2017), is illustrated with drawings by his four children. In an interview with J. Hubner in The Fort Wayne Reader, Henn says that "family and fatherhood were big ideas I was ruminating over in many of the book's poems." His poetic career has philosophical underpinnings, as Henn explains: "I suppose the only wisdom I can claim about life is knowing what most of the poets are trying to tell us, which is that it has an end. It has an end, and as the poet and essayist Thomas Lynch reminds us in The Undertaking, it's a good idea to maintain an awareness of that. Understanding that we will die encourages us to live with care and attention and kindness, and, if we haven't been, to understand and accept that we've only got so long to get better at this before we're done."

Henn was a finalist for the 2017 Jack Grapes Poetry Prize competition. His poem "Soccer Dad" was one of ten finalists in the 2018 Rattle Poetry Prize competition. He was the "Featured Artist" in Issue Three of Twyckenham Notes (Winter 2017). Henn is a three-time winner of the Rattle "Poets Respond" competition, including most recently (October 2019) for his poem about former U.S. Ambassador to the United Nations John Bolton, "They Mustache Him Some Questions." In 2021, three of his poems were selected for inclusion in INverse, Indiana's Poetry Archive.

Henn was the Advanced Placement English teacher of poet Kaveh Akbar in Warsaw, Indiana. The two poets have performed on the same bill at many public readings.

== Bibliography ==
=== Poetry ===
- Unacknowledged Legislations (NYQ Books 2011) ISBN 9781939674074
- And God Said: Let there be Evolution! (NYQ Books 2012) ISBN 9781935520627
- Indiana Noble Sad Man of the Year (Wolfson Press 2017) ISBN 9781939674074
- Guilty Prayer (Main Street Rag 2021)
- American Male (Main Street Rag 2022)

=== Poetry chapbooks ===
- The 30th Anniversary Warsaw Community Commemorative Book Burning (Pudding House Publications 2007)
- Subvert the Dominant Paradigm! (Boneworld Publishing/ Musclehead Press 2009)
- The Book of Nate (2010)
