= Fred Voss =

American poet and novelist

Fred Voss (9 July 1952 – 27 January 2025) was an American poet and novelist who wrote about the lives of American machinists working in factories for over forty years.

Critical response to Voss has been generally positive. For example:

"Fred Voss has been called a poet of alienated labor and can be regarded as the foremost verse chronicler of blue-collar working life in America, preeminently in his first full-length collection, Goodstone (1991). This is a multifaceted dramatization of his experiences as a machinist in the factories of the Los Angeles area, where he has worked, and at times been laid off, for more than two decades. He continued a powerful poetry of social witness in Carnegie Hall with Tin Walls (1998) expanding his scope to look outside the workplace, sympathizing with the economically vulnerable. The masculine environment and implicitly political undertones of Voss's writing place it in a line of descent from the proletarian poets of the 1930s as well as Californian novelists such as John Steinbeck and Louis Adamic. It is also characterized by a Walt Whitman-like embracing of the human spirit. His prolific output, humour and hammered-down vernacular recall Charles Bukowski, the contemporary poet he most admires." Jules Smith: The Greenwood Encyclopedia of American Poets and Poetry (2006).

Voss was a machinist in various factories, steel mills and machine shops since 1976. Beginning in 1978 he wrote seven novels. In 1986 he turned to poetry. Since then he wrote over 3,000 poems. He has done seven poetry reading tours of the U.K. and his poetry has been featured on national BBC Radio 4 in 1998 and 2002 and on WBAI Pacific Radio New York in 2017. In 2016 he received the Port of Los Angeles/ Long Beach Labor Coalition's Joe Hill Labor Poetry Award.

== Early life ==
Frederick Wilhelm Voss was born July 8, 1952, in Los Angeles, California, to German father William Alpheus Voss who was born in China to American Christian missionaries, and Scottish/Welsh mother Patricia Bloomfield Voss, born in Hawaii, descendant of Charles Bloomfield, Bishop of London during the 1860s. Voss received a Bachelor of Arts degree in English literature from the University of California at Riverside in 1973 and was accepted into the Ph.D. program in English literature at University of California, Los Angeles. After two quarters of study he dropped out to work in factories and began his machinist career.

== Career ==
From 1979 to 1985 Fred Voss wrote seven novels about the lives of working-class people, unable to publish them at the time. In 1986, after the death of his father, he began writing poetry about his work experiences. Marvin Malone published 42 of these poems as a special section, The Standard of Excellence in Wormwood Review 113 in 1989 and Pearl magazine featured Voss's poetry as a special section, Prime, in 1990.

Critics judge that it was in the UK that Voss's work gained its first significant recognition:

"The major breakthrough came in Britain during 1989–1990, when more than a hundred of his poems were published in successive issues of the literary magazine Bete Noire whose editor John Osborne (professor of American Studies at the University of Hull) hailed Voss's factory poems as without parallel in contemporary Anglo-American verse. Goodstone published by Event Horizon Press in the U.S. and Bloodaxe Books in the U.K. in 1991 was enthusiastically reviewed in the London Review of Books and in British national newspapers. In the UK Voss's work has been picked up by the London poet Martin Hayes who writes about his life in the courier industry in the same frank manner.

For the next 33 years, Voss continued publishing his working-class poetry, including three more full-length collections: Carnegie Hall with Tin Walls (Bloodaxe Books 1998)ISBN 1-85224-473-9 Bloodaxe Books P.O. Box ISBN Newcastle upon Tyne NE99 1SN and Hammers and Hearts of the Gods (Bloodaxe Books 2009)ISBN 978-1-85224-846-8 Bloodaxe Books, Highgreen, Tarset NE48 1RP, which was selected as Book of the Year 2009 by The Morning Star (UK) and Someday There Will Be Machine Shops Full of Roses ISBN 9781739772284 Smokestack Books, School Farm, Nether Silton, Thirsk, North Yorkshire, YO7 2JZ. He has published regularly in Pearl, The Wormwood Review, The Blue Collar Review, 5 a.m., The Chiron Review, Nerve Cowboy and The Atlantic Review in the U.S. and in Ambit, Poetry Review, Poetry Ireland Review, The Shop, The Penniless Press, Mistress Quickly's Bed (MQB), The Morning Star and Culture Matters in the U.K. and Ireland. In 2015 World Parade Books published his novel, Making America StrongISBN 9780692302798 World Parade Books, 5267 Warner Ave #191 Huntington Beach, CA 92649 worldparadebooks.wordpress.com. His work is archived at the University of Newcastle, University Library Special Collections and Archives and at California State University at Los Angeles, University Library Special Collection and Archives.

== Personal life ==
In 1990 Fred Voss married Joan Jobe Smith, poet, fiction writer memoir writer and founding editor of the long-running (1974–2014) literary journal, "Pearl" and five issues (2000–2005) of Bukowski Review.

== Awards ==
The Wormwood Award 1988. The Chiron Review Chapbook Contest Winner (with Joan Jobe Smith) 1996 Nerve Cowboy Chapbook Contest Winner (with Joan Jobe Smith) 2013 Atlanta Review Poetry International Publications Prize 2007 The Morning Star Book of the Year 2009 Joe Hill Labor Poetry Award (from the Port of Los Angeles/ Long Beach Labor Coalition)

== Works ==
Goodstone, Event Horizon Press 1991, Bloodaxe Books 1991. Carnegie Hall with Tin Walls Bloodaxe Books 1998. Hammers and Hearts of the Gods, Bloodaxe Books, 2009, Pearl Editions 2016. Making America Strong, World Parade Books, 2015 Robots Have No Bones, Culture Matters, 2019.

=== Anthologies ===
A New Geography of Poets, University of Arkansas Press, 1992 Poetry With an Edge, Bloodaxe Books, 1993. The Outlaw Bible of American Poetry, Thunder's Mouth Press NY 1999. Flora Poetica, Chatto and Windus, Random House, 2001 Staying Alive, Bloodaxe Books, 2002, Miramax Books NY 2003 Being Alive, Bloodaxe Books, 2004. Literature and its Writers Bedford/St Martin's, Boston MA 2013 The Giant Book of Poetry, Level Four Press, San Diego, CA, 2014.
