= Chris Collins =

Chris Collins may refer to:

== Arts and entertainment ==
=== Music ===
- Chris Collins (American musician), American musician, recording engineer/producer and technologist
- Chris Collins (Australian musician), Australian musician, recording engineer and producer
- Chris Collins (singer), former vocalist for the American prog rock band now known as Dream Theater

=== Television ===
- Chris Collins or K. C. Collins, Canadian-born American actor
- Chris Collins (writer), American television writer
- Christopher Collins, American actor

== Politics ==
- Chris Collins (Canadian politician) (born 1962), Member of the Legislative Assembly from Moncton, New Brunswick, Canada
- Chris Collins (New York politician) (born 1950), former U.S. Representative for New York's 27th congressional district (2013–2019), now in Florida
- Chris Collins (Virginia politician) (born 1971), former member of the Virginia House of Delegates (2016–2020)

== Sports ==
- Chris Collins (basketball) (born 1974), basketball player and coach from Northbrook, Illinois
- Chris Collins (ice hockey) (born 1984), American ice hockey player
- Chris Collins (lacrosse) (born 1982), American lacrosse player
- Chris Collins (soccer) (born 1956), retired American soccer player
- Chris Collins (American football) (born 1982), American football player
- Chris Collins (boxer) (born 1960), boxer from Grenada

== See also ==
- Christopher Collins (disambiguation)
- Christine Collins (1888–1964), Los Angeles mother whose 9-year-old son went missing
- Collins (surname)
