= Carl Hehn =

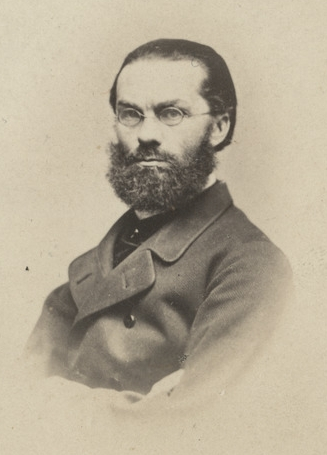

Carl Georg Franz Hehn (Russian: Карл Георг Франц Ген; 25 April 1821 – 19 February 1875) was a Baltic German agricultural scientist and a professor at the University of Dorpat (Tartu). He conducted research on soil liming, effect of climate on agriculture, and was a founder of the Baltic Forest Society in 1865.

Hehn was born in Odenpa, Livonia, to pastor Bernhard Gottlieb Hoehn (1776-1856) and his wife Caroline Körber (1785-1878). He went to the Dorpat Gymnasium (1833-1838) and then to the University where he received a candidate's degree with a dissertation Ueber den Reichtum des Bodens. He then taught at Pskov before returning to Dorpat and studying agricultural sciences. In 1849 he became a teacher at the Dorpat Veterinary School and in 1858 he received a master's degree with a dissertation Die Intensität der livländischen Landwirtschaft. He managed an estate in Pskov where he introduced land ownership by peasants. In 1860 he took a position as secretary of the Livonia public benefit and economic society and worked there for 8 years. During this period he edited the society's periodical Baltische Wochenschrift für Landwirtschaft, Gewerbefleiß und Handel and organized the first all-Baltic agricultural fair in 1865. An agricultural school (now Riga Technical University) was created in 1862 and in 1867-68 and Hehn was appointed the first professor of agriculture. He became a full professor of agricultural technology in 1873 and taught courses in soil science, plant sciences, economics, cattle breeding and the history of agriculture. In 1874 he began to write a dissertation on Der Einfluss des Klimas auf die Baltische Landwirtschaft but did not complete it as he died from tuberculosis.
