= Pühajärve =

Village in Estonia

- Village
- Location in Estonia
- Coordinates: 58°02′47″N 26°27′21″E
- Country: Estonia
- County: Valga County
- Municipality: Otepää Parish

Population (07.02.2008)
  - Total: 182

Pühajärve (German: Heiligensee) is a village in Otepää Parish, Valga County in southern Estonia. It has a population of 182 (as of 7 February 2008).

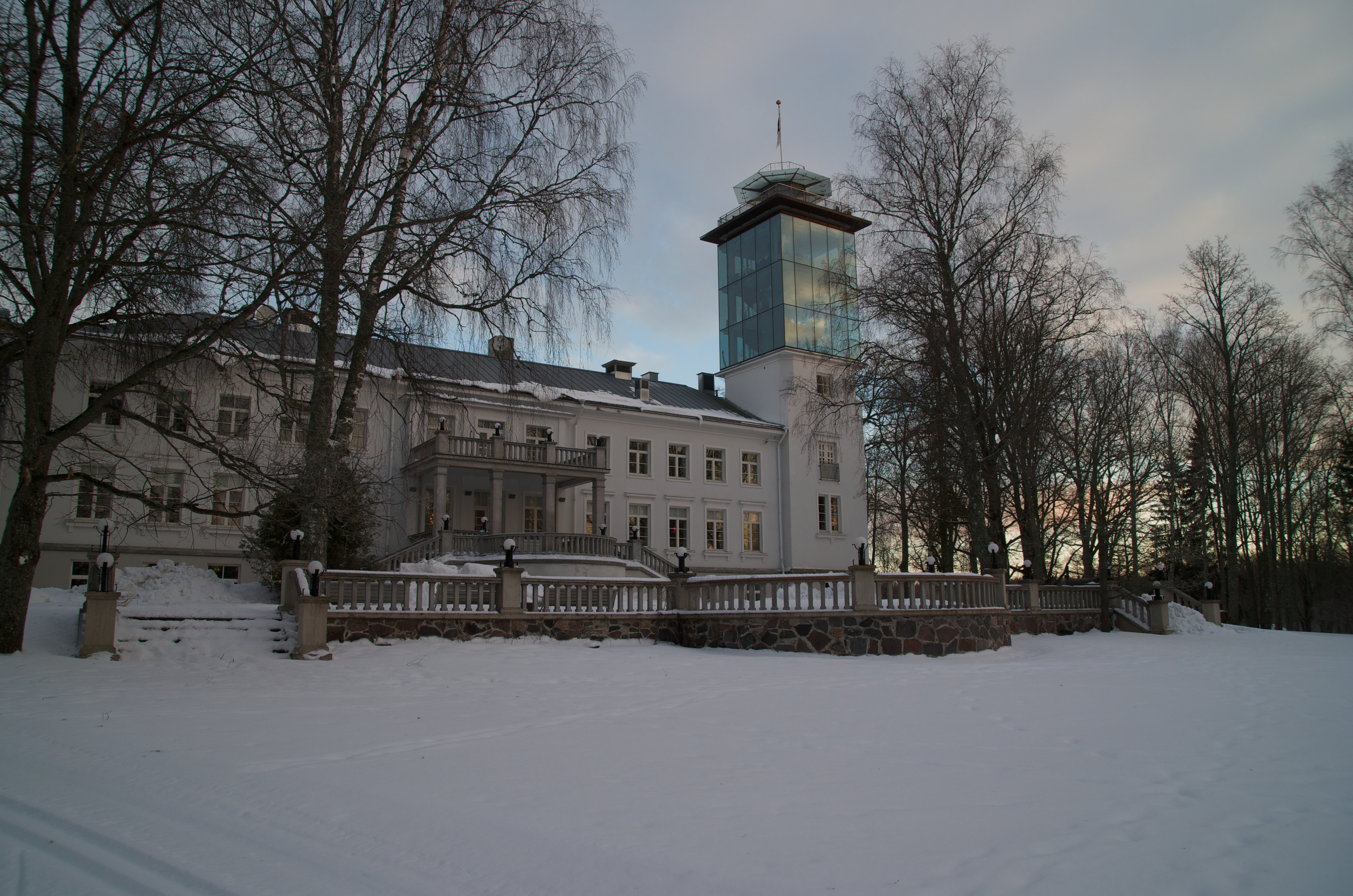
Main building of Pühajärve Manor

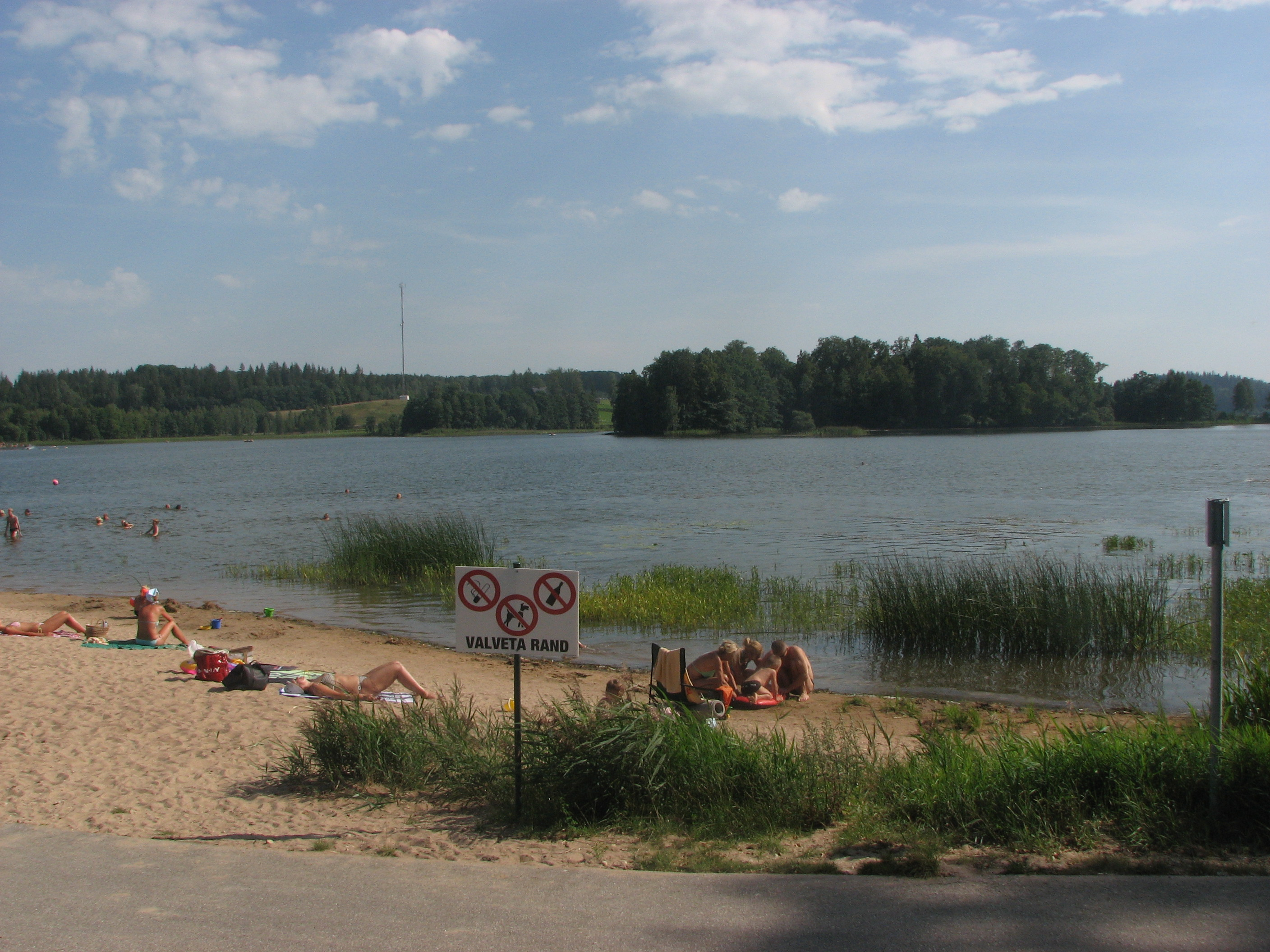
Lake Pühajärv

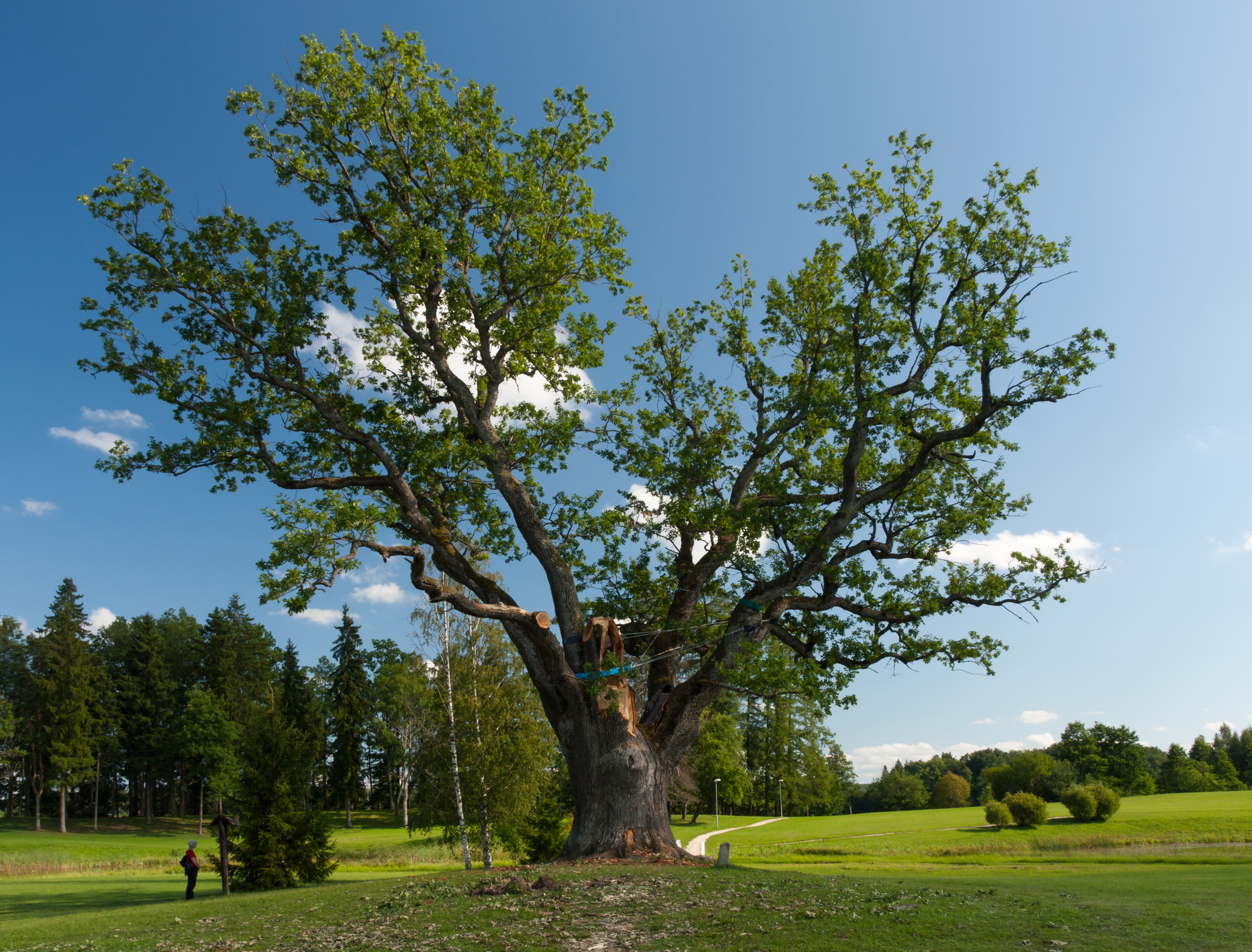
Pühajärve War Oak

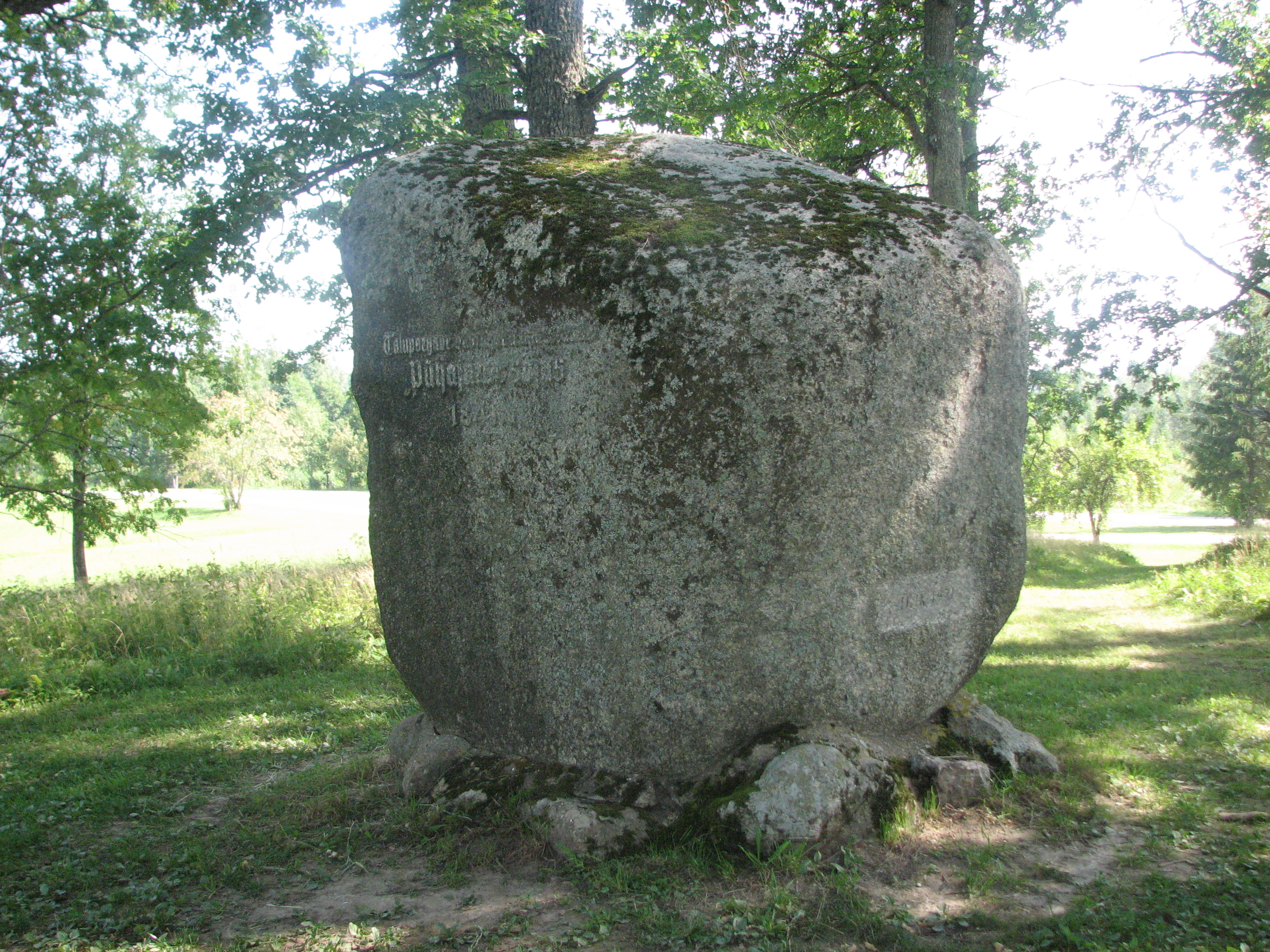
Memorial of Pühajärve War

== Notable people ==
- Ahti Kõo (born 1952), politician

== See also ==
- Pühajärv
