= Harry George Henn =

American lawyer (1919–1994)

Harry George Henn (October 8, 1919 - October 11, 1994) was a law professor at Cornell University and an author of widely used law books.

Henn was born in New Rochelle, New York. He received an undergraduate degree from New York University and his law degree from Cornell.

He was an expert in copyright and corporate law.

He became a professor at Cornell in 1958 and in 1970 was named the first Edward Cornell Professor of Law, a chair he held until his retirement in 1985.

He retired to Naples, Florida, and died in Jacksonville, Florida, of myelodysplastic anemia.
