= Hen Island =

Hen Island may refer to:

- Hen Island (Connecticut)
- Hen Island (Maryland)
- Hen Island (Ontario)
- Hen Island (Tasmania)
- Hen Island, County Down, a townland in County Down, Northern Ireland
- Hen Island, Taranga Island, one of the Hen and Chicken Islands, New Zealand
