= Arthur Henn =

Arthur Henn may refer to:

- Arthur E. Henn (1940–2001), admiral in the United States Coast Guard
- Arthur Wilbur Henn (1890–1959), American ichthyologist and herpetologist
