= Pühajärv =

Lake in Estonia

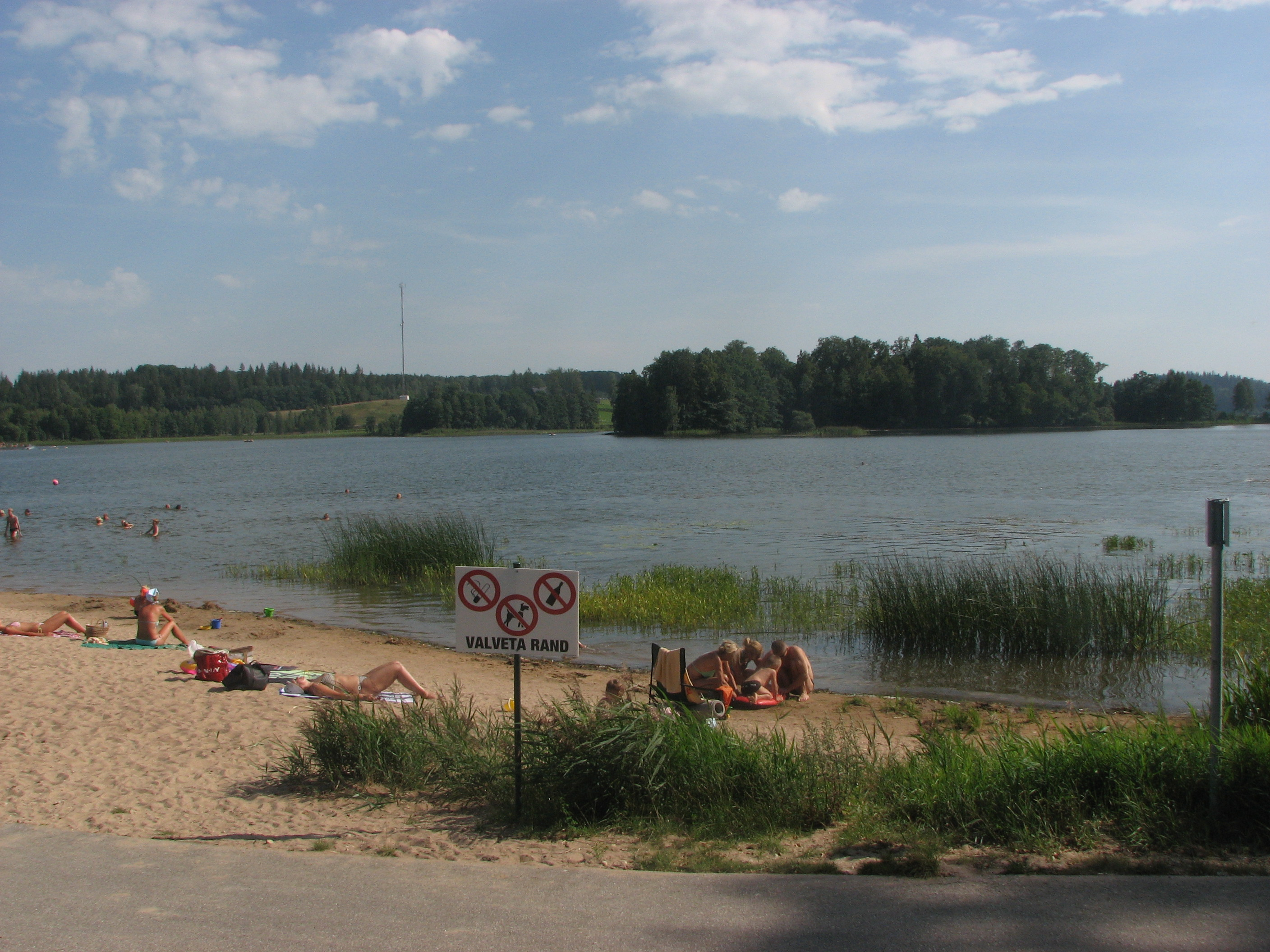

- Location within Estonia
- Location: Valga County
- Coordinates: 58°02′N 26°27′E
- Basin countries: Estonia
- Max. length: 3,610 meters (11,840 ft)
- Max. width: 1,600 meters (5,200 ft)
- Surface area: 293.0 hectares (724 acres)
- Average depth: 4.8 meters (16 ft)
- Max. depth: 8.7 meters (29 ft)
- Water volume: 13,982,000 cubic meters (493,800,000 cu ft)
- Shore length^{1}: 16,280 meters (53,410 ft)
- Surface elevation: 115.3 meters (378 ft)
- Islands: 4
- ^{1} Shore length is not a well-defined measure.

Pühajärv (Holy Lake) is a lake in Estonia. It is located in the village of Pühajärve in Otepää Parish, Valga County. The Väike Emajõgi River flows out of the lake.

== Physical description ==
The lake has an area of 293.0 hectares (724 acres), and it has four islands with a combined area of 7.1 hectares (18 acres). The lake has an average depth of 4.8 meters (16 ft) and a maximum depth of 8.7 meters (29 ft). It is 3,610 meters (11,840 ft) long, and its shoreline measures 16,280 meters (53,410 ft). It has a volume of 13,982,000 cubic meters (493,800,000 cu ft).

== See also ==
- List of lakes of Estonia
