= Hen (name) =

Hen is a surname, a masculine given name, and a diminutive of the names Henry, Hendrick, Hennie, Hendrie, Henrique, Henrick, Henriette, and Henrietta. Notable people with the name Hen or Hens include:

Surnames:

- Coel Hen, Semi-legendary king of Sub-Roman Britain
- Gwilym ab Ieuan Hen (fl. c. 1440–1480), Welsh poet
- Jorge Peña Hen (1928–1973), Chilean composer and academic
- Józef Hen (born 1923), Polish novelist, essayist, playwright, screenwriter and reporter
- Llywarch Hen, sixth century prince of the kingdom of Rheged
- Tal Hen (born 1979), Israeli footballer
- Tudur Hen (died 1311), Welsh aristocrat
- Yehezkel Hen (1882–1952), Israeli politician
- Zerahiah ben Shealtiel Ḥen (fl. late 13th century), Spanish Jewish physician, philosopher, translator and Hebraist
- Pascal Hens (born 1980), German team handball player
- Thorsten Hens (born 1961), German economist

Given name:

- Hen Azriel (born 1988), Israeli footballer
- Hen Ezra (born 1989), Israeli footballer
- Hen Mazzig, Israeli writer and activist
- Hen Pearce (1777–1809), English bare knuckle prizefighter
- Hen Reuven (born 1992), Israeli footballer
- Hen Sophal (born 1958), Cambodian artist

Nickname:

- Henrietta "Hen" Wilson, a first responder played by Aisha Hinds on the TV drama 9-1-1

== See also ==
- Harald III Hen (c. 1040–1080), King of Denmark
- Richard Henshall, nicknamed "Hen", a British musician
