= Christopher Henn-Collins =

Colonel Christopher Henn-Collins
- Born: 5 June 1915; Shrewsbury, England
- Died: 8 August 2006 (aged 91)
- Service years: 1934–1947
- Rank: Lieutenant-colonel
- Conflicts: Polish Campaign, World War II

Lieutenant-Colonel Christopher A Henn-Collins (5 June 1915 – 8 August 2006), CEng, FIEE, FIERE served in the Second World War, notably, in the Polish Campaign under General Adrian Carton de Wiart. After the war Henn-Collins was a prolific inventor, including the first transistorised quartz clock.

== Early life ==
Born in 1915, Christopher Henn-Collins was the third son of Lieutenant-Colonel the Hon. Richard Henn Collins, CMG, DSO, and grandson of Lord Collins, Master of the Rolls from 1901 to 1907. He was educated at Shrewsbury, and destined for a military career in his father's regiment, but pleaded to be allowed to pursue his boyhood ambition to be a telecommunications engineer. In 1934 he enlisted as a Gentleman Cadet at the Royal Military Academy at Woolwich for signals training and was commissioned in 1935.

== Polish Campaign ==
After service in Palestine, Henn-Collins was possibly the first serving officer to come under enemy fire in the early hours of the Second World War. In August 1939, when he was Brigade Signals Officer to the 1st Brigade of Guards, he had been ordered to lead a detachment of signallers and their equipment into Poland, as part of a British Military Mission under the command of the battle-scarred veteran General Carton de Wiart, VC, blinded in one eye and with an artificial hand. Their objective was to set up radio communications between Mission HQ in Warsaw, the UK and units of the Polish army. They were to travel in plain clothes, but with battle-dress in their kit, and six tons of equipment, through France to Marseille, where HMS Shropshire would take them to Alexandria. There they were issued with passports and fictitious occupations, before trans-shipping to a ferry en route to Turkey, by which time Britain and France were at war with Germany. From there they travelled by rail through Romania, setting up radio communications along the way.

By the time they crossed the Polish frontier southeast of Warsaw, German armoured divisions were driving east towards the capital, and their reconnaissance planes were taking an interest in this strange convoy, which was now in a war zone. The detachment was ordered to change into uniform. In Lvov they were under heavy fire from low-flying aircraft: they could not move forward, nor could they stay put, risking further attentions from the Luftwaffe. For several nights they shuttled to and fro a few miles west to east and back again, awaiting instructions, and it was not until 8 September when they rendezvoused with General de Wiart, who had moved his headquarters from Warsaw to Tarnopol, that their mission was abandoned. They were ordered to destroy their equipment, and make their way home in twos and threes as best they could. Back in Alexandria Henn-Collins's instructions were to return to London where he was posted to Staff College at Camberley, and wrote a critical report on the lessons to be learned from this expedition.

Although the mission was aborted, the outcome would have been quite different if the Russians had not invaded. The Poles had plans to conduct a guerrilla war in the east, and a British Signals unit behind the lines would have been of considerable use to the Allies.

== Later wartime postings ==
For Henn-Collins various postings during the next three years included a period in the Directorate of Military Training, and promotion to major and then, with the rank of lieutenant-colonel, to Allied Forces Headquarters in Algiers as Officer in Charge of Radio Section, to set up links throughout the North African Theatre.

== Post-war engineering career and retirement ==
He was a resourceful, inventive, and practical engineer. He patented an enciphering and deciphering machine, assigned to the Ministry of Supply with no financial benefit to himself; and he had so many ideas for civilian projects which could not be exploited within the service that he resigned his commission in 1947 in order to set up as a consulting engineer.

Partly as a result of his wartime contacts, his company, Henn-Collins Associates, undertook a wide range of projects for government agencies and commercial organisations worldwide, mostly in the field of telecommunications, but he had other interests as well, and in the 1950s and 60s he patented a number of devices of an electro-mechanical nature. In his workshop he developed his idea for a quartz crystal clock which by using transistors in place of thermionic valves, made possible a much smaller quartz clock than was previously feasible. He described his "mantelpiece" clock in the British Horological Journal in 1957 and showed it at an exhibition in Goldsmiths' Hall in 1958, "The Pendulum to the Atom", which was opened by Prince Philip, Duke of Edinburgh. Christopher Henn-Collins and Dr Louis Essen, inventor of the caesium clock were presented to him.

Before he retired to Guernsey in 1970 he represented the Institution of Electrical Engineers and the Institution of Electrical and Radio Engineers on a British Standards Institution committee which produced a Code of Practice for the reception of sound and television broadcasting. He returned to England three years before his death.

== Personal life ==
He married first Patricia Hooper, who died in 1974, and in 1976 he married Andora de Quehen who survived him.
