= Pearl (literary magazine) =

- Discipline: Literary journal
- Language: English
- Edited by: Joan Jobe Smith, Marilyn Johnson, and Barbara Hauk

Publication details
- History: 1974-2014
- Frequency: Biannual

Standard abbreviations
- ISO 4: Pearl

Links
- Journal homepage

Pearl was an American literary journal published between 1974 and 2014 in Long Beach, California.

== History and profile ==
Pearl was founded by Joan Jobe Smith in 1974. The first issue appeared in May 1974. It was edited by Joan Jobe Smith, Marilyn Johnson, and Barbara Hauk. Pearl was based in Long Beach. It released an annual fiction issue and an annual poetry issue as well as hosting an annual poetry prize.

After several issues published Pearl went defunct until 1986 when Joan Jobe Smith and Marilyn Johnson relaunched it.

The magazine ceased publication in 2014.

== Contributors ==
- Charles Bukowski
- Jim Daniels
- Ed Ochester
- Frank X. Gaspar
- Robert Peters
- Fred Voss
- Billy Collins

== See also ==
- List of literary magazines
