= Lake Udsu =

Lake in Estonia

- Udsu järv (Estonian)
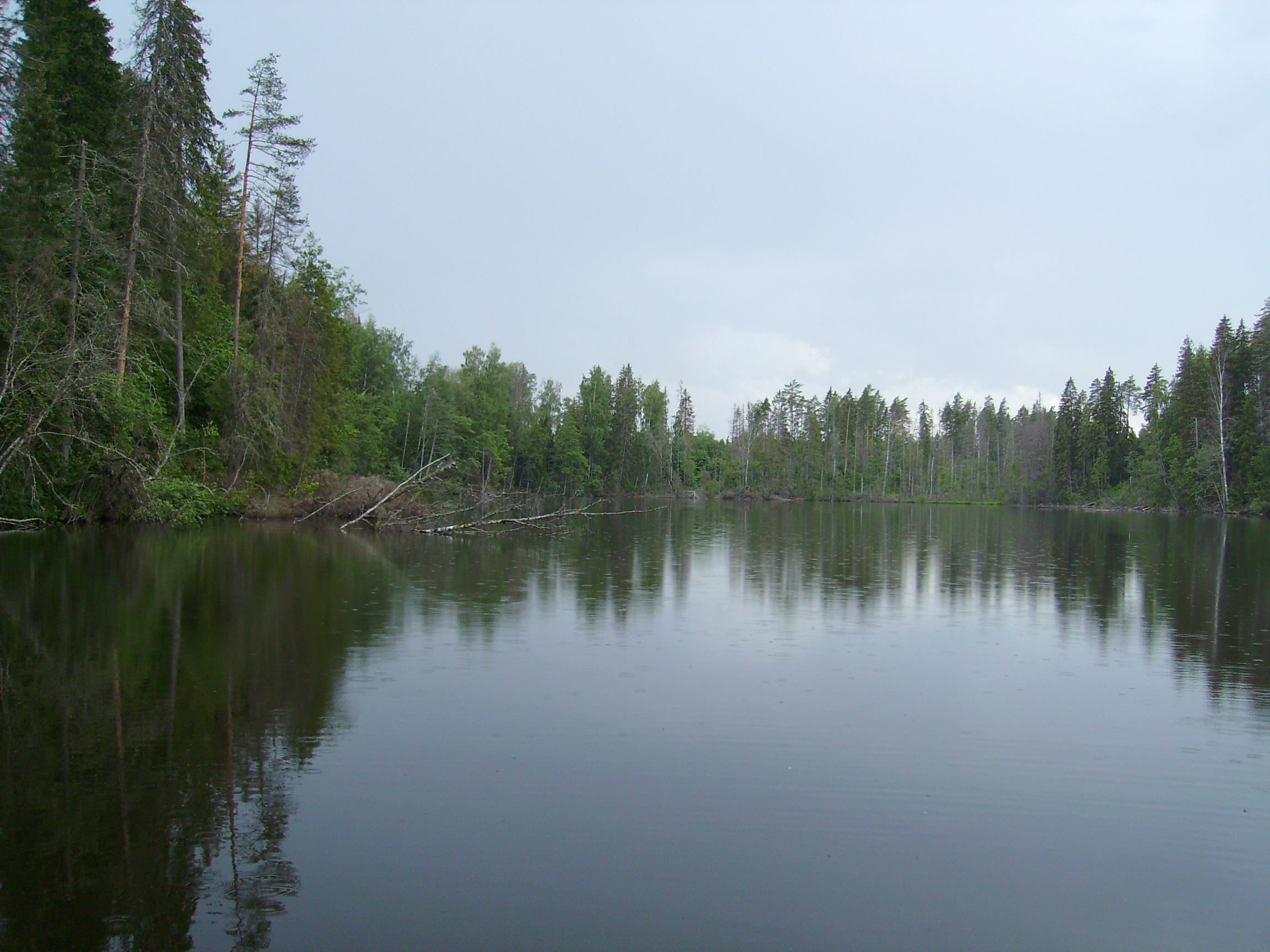

- Location within Estonia
- Location: Tõrva Parish, Valga County, Estonia
- Coordinates: 57.904999°N 25.857779°E
- Basin countries: Estonia
- Max. length: 490 meters (1,610 ft)
- Surface area: 6.9 hectares (17 acres)
- Max. depth: 30.2 meters (99 ft)
- Shore length^{1}: 1,190 meters (3,900 ft)
- Surface elevation: 77.4 hectares (191 acres)
- ^{1} Shore length is not a well-defined measure.

Lake Udsu (Estonian: Udsu järv, also Kokajärv, Uutsu järv, or Linsi järv) is a lake in Estonia. It is located in the village of Jeti in Tõrva Parish, Valga County. Lake Udsu is one of the deepest lakes in Estonia. Lake Udsu belongs to the Koorküla Nature Reserve.

== Physical description ==
The lake has an area of 6.9 hectares (17 acres) The lake has a maximum depth of 30.2 meters (99 ft). It is 490 meters (1,610 ft) long, and its shoreline measures 1,190 meters (3,900 ft). Lake Udsu is an oligotrophic lake.

== See also ==
- List of lakes of Estonia
