= Koorküla Nature Reserve =

Protected area in Estonia

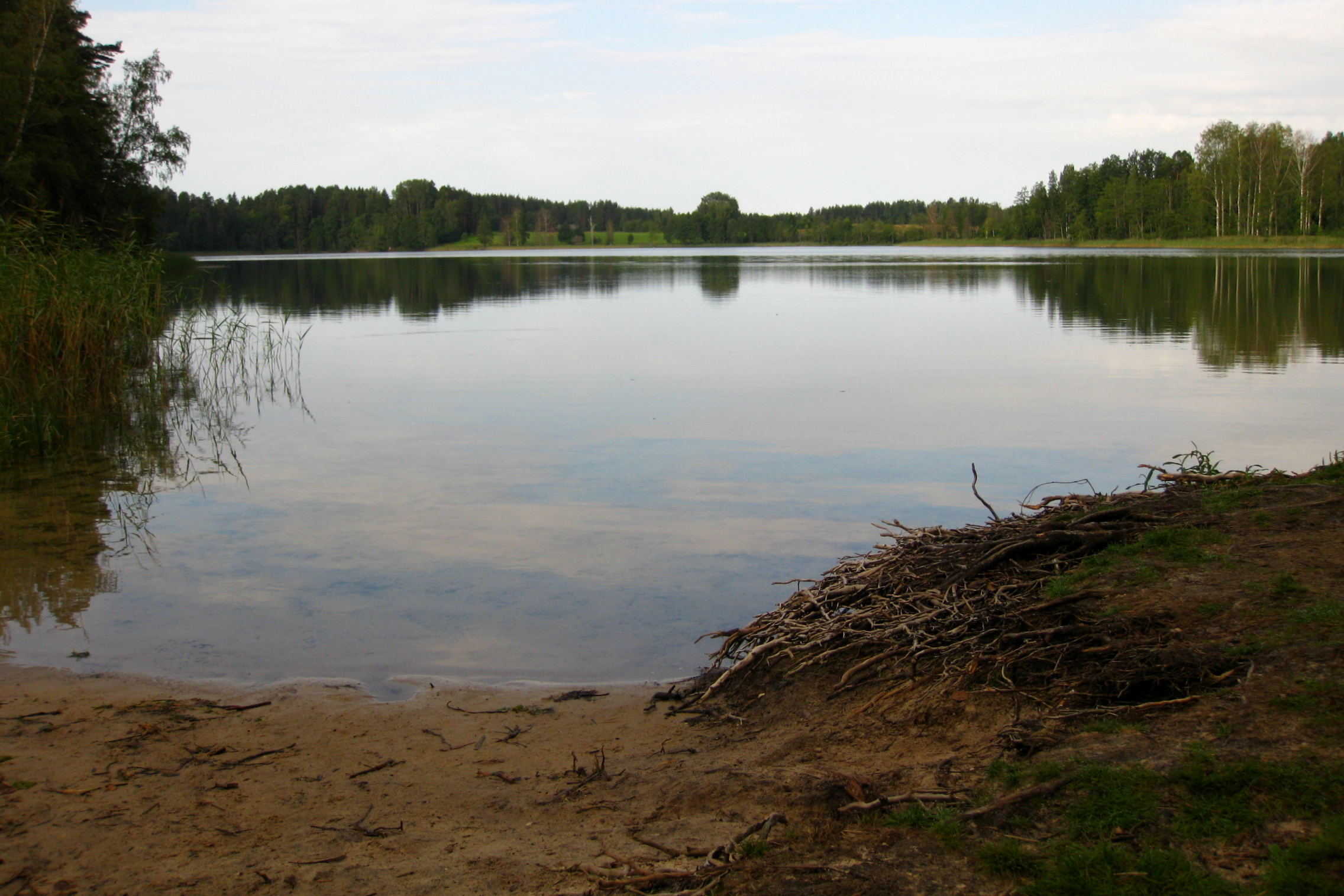

- Location within Estonia
- Location: Estonia
- Coordinates: 57°54′N 25°52′E
- Area: 353 ha (870 acres)
- Established: 1964 (2005)

Koorküla Nature Reserve is a nature reserve which is located in Valga County, Estonia.

The area of the nature reserve is 353 ha.

The protected area was founded in 1964 to protect Koorküla Valgjärv and the forest around the lake.
