= Sigala, Hiiu County =

Village in Estonia

Sigala
- Village
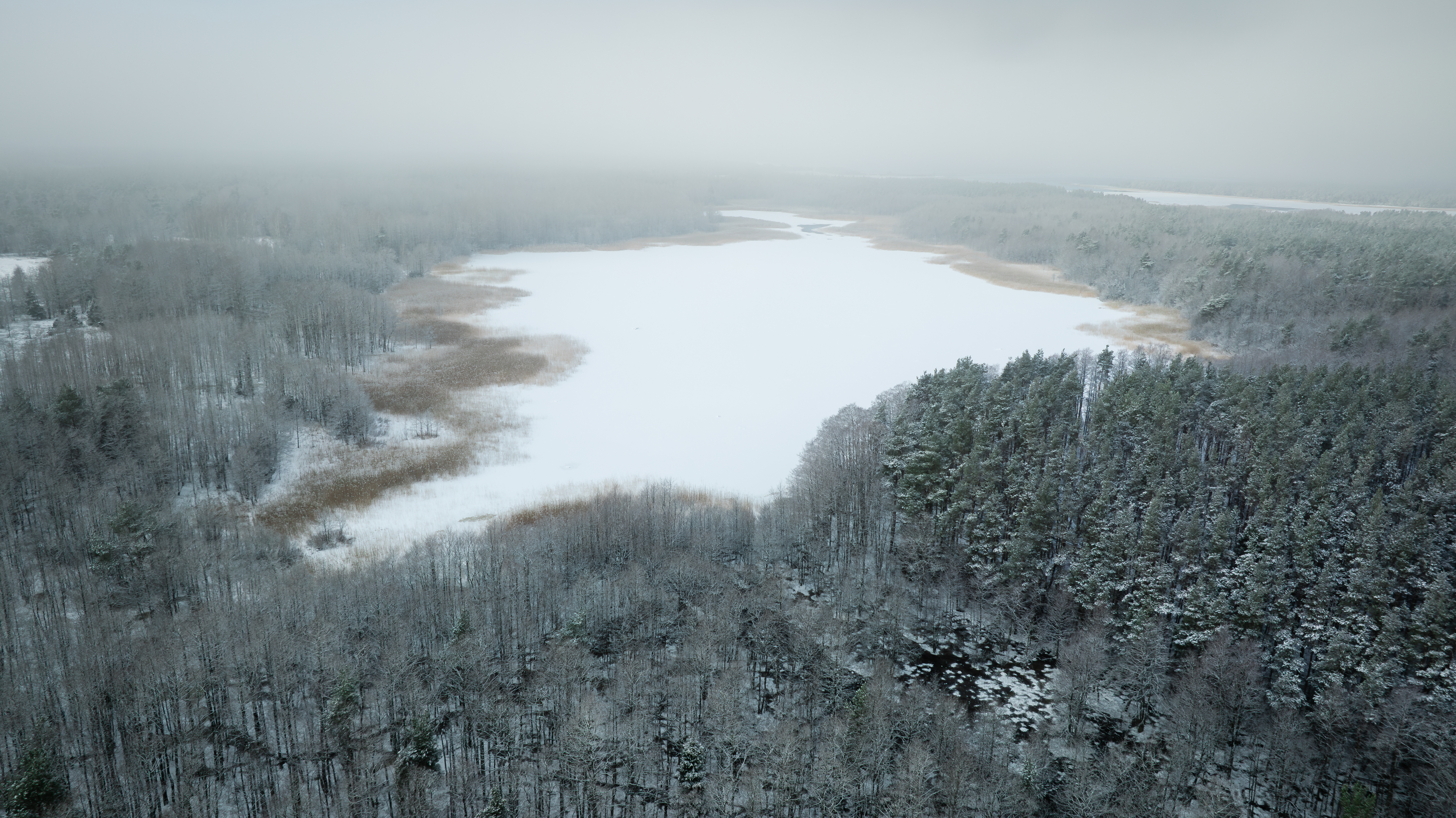

- Location within Estonia
- Coordinates: 59°01′N 22°32′E
- Country: Estonia
- County: Hiiu County
- Parish: Hiiumaa Parish
- Time zone: UTC+2 (EET)
  - Summer (DST): UTC+3 (EEST)

Sigala is a village in Hiiumaa Parish, Hiiu County in northwestern Estonia. Before 2013, it was located in Kõrgessaare Parish.

== Name ==
Sigala was attested in written sources in 1565 in the personal name Siekla Matz, and in 1576 in the personal name Matz Martson i Sickaleth. The name was attested as Siggalaid in 1728 and Siggala in 1798. The common noun sigala means 'pig farm' in Estonian, but this may be a coincidence. Paul Ariste, Lauri Kettunen, and Edvin Lagman derived the name of the village from siga 'pig'. However, Leo Tiik and Marek Meristo derived the name from siig 'whitefish'. Karl Friedrich Wilhelm Rußwurm, drawing on folklore, considered it possible that the village name originates from a personal name. Marja Kallasmaa has also assumed that the name comes from a short form of the male name Siegfried, which could be Siggo in Old High German, Siggi in Norwegian, and Sika, Sike, Sycka, or Zyke in Frisian. The suffix of the name was probably shortened from the word laid 'islet, holm'.
