= Tiit-Rein Viitso =

Estonian linguist (1938–2022)

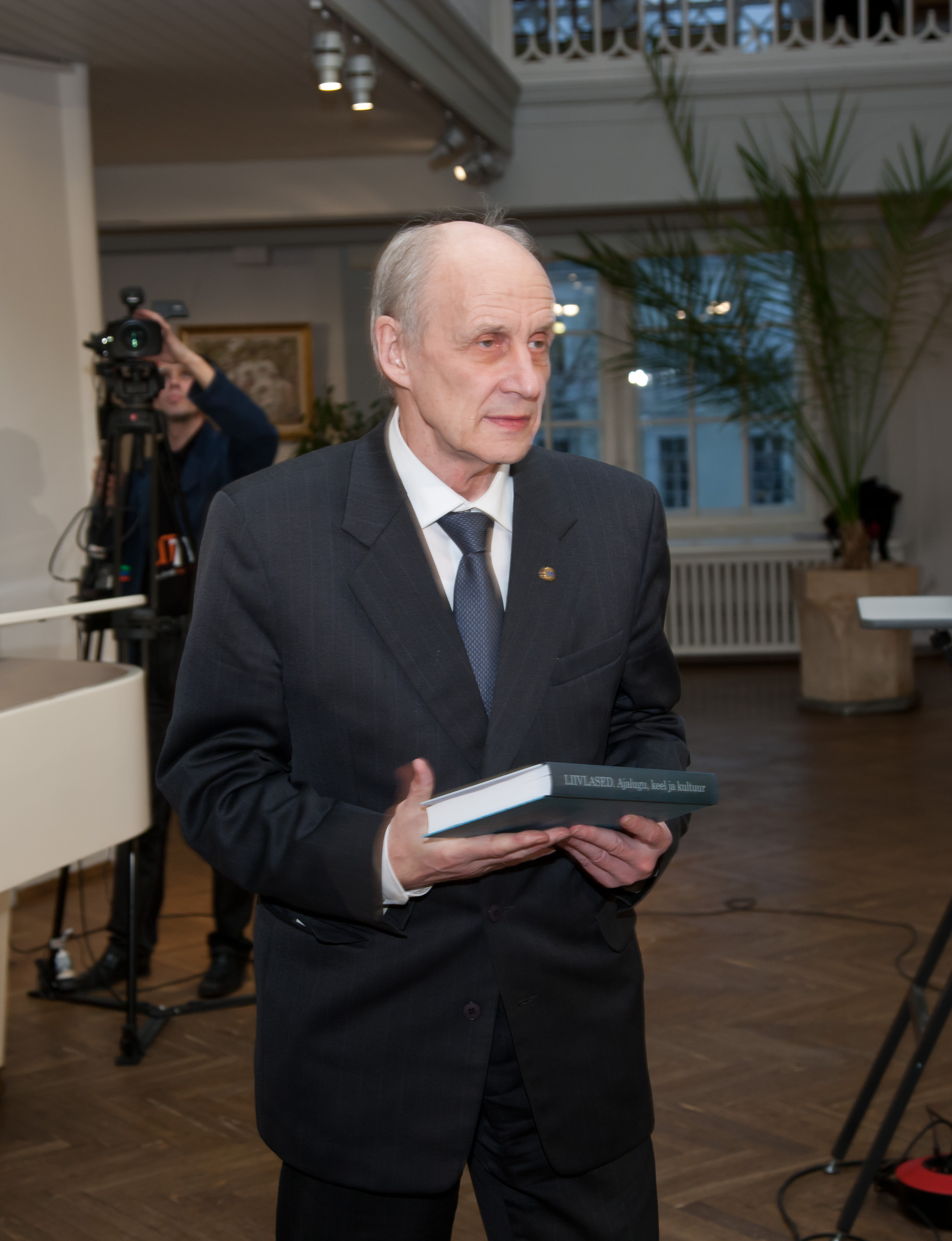
Viitso (2011)

Tiit-Rein Viitso (4 March 1938 – 2 December 2022) was an Estonian linguist.

In 1962, he graduated from Tartu State University in Estonian philology. From 1965 to 1973 he worked at Tartu State University's Computational Centre (Estonian: TRÜ arvutuskeskus). During 1973–1993 he worked at Estonian Language Institute, and from 1986 – at Tartu State University (now, the University of Tartu).

== Works ==
In 1966, he successfully defended his candidate's thesis focusing on the Onega Vepsian dialect. His dissertation, delving into the comparative phonology of Finnic languages, was penned and defended in 1983. His professional journey spanned various prestigious institutions: he served at the University of Tartu Computing Centre from 1965 to 1973, then transitioned to the Institute of Language and Literature, where he held positions as a senior researcher until 1993, eventually ascending to the role of leading researcher. Simultaneously, he contributed significantly to academia as an extraordinary professor at the University of Tartu Department of Estonian Language from 1991 to 1993, later assuming the esteemed position of professor of Finnic languages from 1993 to 2003.

== Designations ==
From 1993 to 1997, he led the Estonian Mother Tongue Society, overseeing its endeavors. Concurrently, he held the esteemed position of editor-in-chief for the journal Linguistica Uralica and lent his expertise to numerous other editorial boards. His contributions were acknowledged with several prestigious honors, including the Order of the White Star (5th Class), the University of Tartu Grand Medal, and the esteemed Paul Ariste Medal from the Estonian Academy of Sciences. In 2011, he was honored with the F.J. Wiedemann Language Award, further affirming his scholarly prowess. Notably, for his significant contributions to the preservation of Livonian, he was bestowed with an honorary doctorate from the University of Latvia in 2006. In 2012, his dedication was further recognized when he received the Republic of Latvia Cross of Recognition (4th Class).

His main fields of research have been Finnic languages, especially Estonian, Livonian, Votic and Veps languages. From 2007 he was the chief editor of the journal Linguistica Uralica. In 1989, and again, from 1993 until 1997, he was the director of the Mother Tongue Society (Emakeele Selts).

Viitso died on 2 December 2022, at the age of 84.

== Awards ==
- 2001: Order of the White Star, V class.
- 2011: Wiedemann Language Award

== Works ==
- Äänisvepsa murde väljendustasandi kirjeldus (1968)
- Läänemeresoome keelte fonoloogia küsimusi (1981)
- Erzya prosody (2003, one of the authors)
- Meadow Mari prosody (2005, one of the authors)
- Liivi keel ja läänemeresoome keelemaastikud (2008)
- Livonian prosody (2008, one of the authors)
- Atlas Linguarum Fennicarum I-III (2004–2010) (one of the authors)
- Līvõkīel-ēstikīel-leţkīel sõnārōntõz (2012) (with Valts Ernštreits)
- Eesti keele ajalugu (2020)
