= Estonian name =

In Estonia, a person must have a surname and one or more given names. One or two given names are common, whereas the legally permitted maximum number (three) given names is nowadays very rarely used. Surname is inherited from one of the parents, and given names must be chosen by the parents at birth. The calling name, by which the person is normally identified in conversation, is one of the given names, typically the first. For example, the former president Lennart Georg Meri was usually called Lennart, and became widely known as Lennart Meri.

There is no patronymic part and multiple given names are used rarely. During the Soviet occupation, the official names of Estonians followed the East Slavic naming customs of "given name"/"patronymic"/"family name", (Note: For example, Estonian writer Oskar Luts was officially written in Russian "Оскар Хиндрикович Лутс", Oskar Khindrikhovich Luts, i.e., Oskar, son of Hindrick, Luts.) but this custom was abandoned in the post-Soviet Estonia.

== Historical personal names ==
Prior to 1819 very few Estonians had surnames. For more exact reference, the given name was prepended with a byname, some kind of identifier in possessive case, such as the name of the father, farmstead, birthplace, trade, or profession. (Note: Name examples: "Mardi Juhhan", meaning "Mart's Juhhan"; "Vana-Piigandi mõisa Raudseppa Jaak" literally "blacksmith Jaak of Vana-Piigant farm", 'Janusse Hanso sullane Kawerdi Merk" means "Merk of farmhand Kawert, of Hans, of Janus", meaning Merk is son of farmhand Kawert, grandson of Hans, grand-grandson of Janus.)

In records written in Latin and Germanic languages typical name patterns include: "placename" + "given name" (rarely "given name"+"placename"), "given name"+ "patronymic"+"placename", "occupational byname" + "given name", or "given name" + "occupational byname". Often the conjunctions "de", 'van", "i" were used before the placenames. A number of variations of recording the patronymics was used, some included the byname of the father. Married women could be recorded with the given name of the father, e.g., in the pattern "«Given name» «Husband's name» wif".

== Given names ==
Very little number of native Estonian given names are recorded from pre-Christian times and most of them virtually disappeared from registries after some time after the beginning of the 13th-century Northern Crusades. However the Christian names became dominant only by the end of the 15th century. There was also a tradition to give two names: one Christian and one Pagan, after a grandparent. This reflected a common Eurasian tradition of worshipping the ancestors. In 19th century, with national awakening a limited number of old names were reintroduced, such as Kairo, Himot, Lembit, Meelis, Sulev. The female given names were not preserved, and historians suggested some reconstructions, such as Virve, Aita, Maimu, Leida, Salme, Väike/Vaike etc.

Germanic names were usually adapted to Estonian phonology, e.g., Dietrich could be changed to Tiidrik or Tiidrek.

In modern times there is a great variety of Estonian given names, mixing Finno-Ugric, Germanic, and other traditions and the Registry Office of the Ministry of Interior reports that parents keep being inventive with the given names. In 1995, of 52,000 recorded given names only about 5,500 ones are used six or more times, i.e., the vast majority of them are unique.

Often it is difficult to recognize whether an Estonian given name is male or female, since there is no grammatic distinction, although this distinction does exist in borrowed names, e.g., "Johannes" vs. "Johanna".

Estonian grammar allows the letters c, q, w, x and y only in foreign names.

Since the 21st century there is a tendency to give names which do not sound strange to Europeans. This is thought to be related to increased labor migration of Estonians.

=== 2004 law ===
In 2004, a law about the names limited the number of name components. Specifically, a given name may consist either at most three separate names or a single double-barrelled name. The law also forbids to use numeric or other characters. The law also restricts (i.e., disallows without sufficient reason):

- unusual names, e.g., too complicated or not conforming the common rules of the language
- names not matching the gender
- well-known names or its abbreviations, or business names, of publicly well-known persons

== Surnames ==
Alexander I of Russia abolished the serfdom in Estonia and Estonian peasants started systematically getting the surnames, for the purpose of census. Only about 5% of the population of about 700,000 of Estonians had surnames. When a person moved to another place, his farmstead-related reference usually changed. It is argued that pastor J.F. von Roth of Kanepi Parish started giving surnames to peasants in 1809. During the reform of 1826-1835 all Estonians were assigned the hereditary family name, written after the given name. Often a byname was re-used as a surname. Commonly a German surname was used, with little influence of Danish, Swedish, or Russian. Russian surnames were taken by peasants who hoped to get land. Peasants who moved to a town tended to get German surnames, which sounded more respectable. For example, if a Jaan Rätsep entered Tartu University, he graduated it as Johannes Schneider.

After Estonia gained independence due to the collapse of the Russian Empire, the government carried out the campaign of Estonianization of surnames. For example, Estonian writer Friedebert Mihkelson changed his name to Friedebert Tuglas. Until mid-1930s the Estonianization was voluntary and recommended, with the assistance of the Mother Tongue Society by Tartu University. During the dictatorship of Konstantin Päts ("Era of Silence"), since mid-1930s, it was politicized and enforced. In 1934 the Estonian Names Association and the Central Bureau of Estonianization of Names were established, both funded by the Government Information and Propaganda Service, replaced by the State Propaganda Service. Estonian linguists issued instructions for Estonianization and published a recommended list of surnames. Since it was the period of the growth of prosperity, despite the name of the era given by the opposition, the government had popular support, including its efforts in fostering the national feelings of Estonians, and the campaign was successful.

During 1935–1940 the Estonian Ministry of Interior maintained the Family Name Protection Register. The protected surnames could be given only to the relatives of the surname owner with his consent. This was no longer possible with the Soviet occupation of Estonia. As of 1940, there were 407 protected surnames in the Register.

=== Transliteration ===
The Onomastic Treasure of the CIA mentions several issues with transliteration in cases when Estonian names were back translated from Russian and from the times when diacritics were used rarely in English print. In Russian, the Estonian double consonants could be rendered both as double and a single, i.e., Jansson could be written in Russian both as Янссон and Янсон, resulting in English Jansson/Janson or Yansson/Yanson. Estonian 'TS' could be rendered in Russian both as 'ТС' or 'Ц', which could create a confusion if 'Ц' transliterates as 'TZ' as in German or Yiddish Katz. If diacritics are not available, umlaut are sometimes replaced with digraphs per usage in German, e.g., Teeäär, written as Teeaeaer. However, the official recommendation is to simply omit them diacritics if they are not available, following Swedish and Finnish usage: 'Teeaar'.

== See also ==
- Finnish name
- Lists of most common surnames in European countries § Estonia
