= Erich Raiet =

Estonian linguist

- Born: Freienthal; January 16, 1920; Venevere Parish
- Died: April 25, 1992 (aged 72); Tallinn

Erich Raiet (16 January 1920 – 25 April 1992) was an Estonian linguist. Until 1940, his name was Freienthal because it was changed.

In 1946, he graduated from Tartu University in Estonian philology. From 1947 to 1992, he worked at Estonian SSR Academy of Sciences' Language and Literature Institute.

He was one of the authors and editors for several dictionaries of Standard Estonian (Estonian: õigekeelsussõnaraamat).

From 1939 on, he was a member of Mother Tongue Society.

== Works ==
- Küsimusi eesti liitverbi alalt. // Eesti NSV TA Keele ja Kirjanduse Instituudi uurimused. I. Tallinn, 1956
- Nimisõnade nimetavalisest ja omastavalisest liitumisest. // KK (1958) 12
- Arnold Kask tänapäeva eesti kirjakeele viljelejana. // Emakeele Seltsi aastaraamat 18 (1972)
- Über die Zusammenstellung des Wörterbuches der estnischen Schriftssprache. // Congressus Tertius Internationalis Fenno-Ugristarum. I. Tallinn, 1975
- "Eesti kirjakeele sõnaraamat" ilmumisjärgus. // KK (1983) 3.

=== Awards ===
- 1990: Wiedemann Language Award
