= Helle Metslang =

Estonian linguist

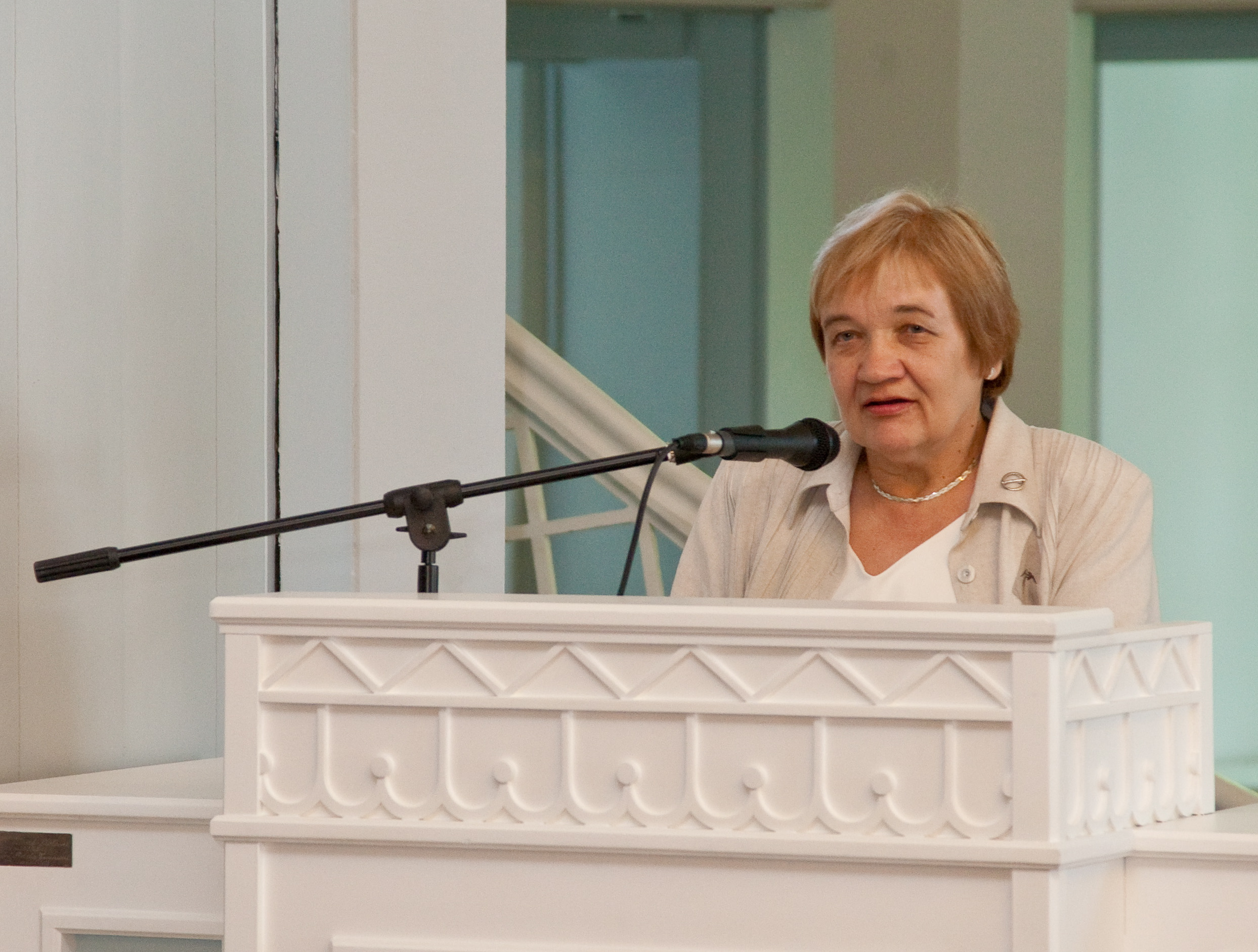
- Helle Metslang in 2010
- Born: July 29, 1950; Paide, Estonian
- Education: University of Tartu (BA), University of Oulu (PhD)
- Occupation: Linguist
- Employer(s): Tallinn University; University of Tartu
- Known for: Estonian syntax; contrastive linguistics; Eesti keele grammatika
- Title: Professor of Estonian; Chair of Contemporary Estonian
- Awards: Wiedemann Language Award (2020); Grand Medal of the University of Tartu (2020); Honorary Doctorate (2020)

Helle Metslang (born 29 July 1950 in Paide) is an Estonian linguist.

== Biography ==
Metslang studied Estonian philology at the University of Tartu, graduating in 1974. She subsequently worked at the Institute of the Estonian Language in Tallinn. In 1978 she defended her candidate thesis on syntactic aspects of Estonian folk poetry. She received her doctoral degree at the University of Oulu in 1994 for a comparative study of Estonian and Finnish.

In 2000, Metslang became Professor of Estonian at Tallinn University, and she held the Chair of Contemporary Estonian at the University of Tartu from 2007 until her retirement in 2020. She has also worked as visiting professor at the University of Helsinki and the University of Oulu. Since 2006, she has been the chairperson of the Mother Tongue Society (Emakeele Selts).

Metslang has been the recipient of numerous national and international awards, including the Wiedemann Language Award (2020), an honorary doctorate from the University of Tartu (2020), and the Grand Medal of the University of Tartu (2020). In 2016 she was elected as a member of the Academia Europaea.

== Research ==
Metslang's research focuses on Estonian syntax, especially the syntax of the verb. She also works on typology and contrastive linguistics, often with a focus on Estonian and Finnish. Along with Mati Erelt and Reet Kasik she is one of the lead authors of Eesti keele grammatika, the main current descriptive grammar of the Estonian language.

== Selected publications ==
- Erelt, Mati, Reet Kasik, Helle Metslang, et al. 1995. Eesti keele grammatika (Grammar of the Estonian language). Tallinn: Eesti Keele Instituut (Institute of the Estonian Language).
- Erelt, Mati, and Helle Metslang. 2006. Estonian clause patterns—from Finno-Ugric to standard average European. Linguistica Uralica 42 (4), 254-266.
- Metslang, Helle. 1981. Küsilause eesti keeles (The interrogative sentence in Estonian). Eesti NSV Teaduste Akadeemia.
- Metslang, Helle. 1994. Temporal relations in the predicate and the grammatical system of Estonian and Finnish. Oulu: Oulun Yliopisto. ISBN 9514239989.
- Metslang, Helle. 1996. The development of the futures in the Finno-Ugric languages. In Mati Erelt (ed.), Estonian: Typological studies I, 123-144.
- Metslang, Helle. 2001. On the developments of the Estonian aspect: The verbal particle ära. In Östen Dahl and Maria Koptjevskaja-Tamm (eds.), Circum-Baltic Languages: Volume 2: Grammar and Typology, 443-479. ISBN 9789027230591
- Metslang, Helle. 2009. Estonian grammar between Finnic and SAE: some comparisons. Language Typology and Universals 62 (1-2), 49-71.
