= Helju =

Female given name

- Gender: Female
- Language: Estonian
- Name day: 31 May

Origin
- Region of origin: Estonia

Other names
- Related names: Elga, Helga, Helge, Helgi, Helja, Helje, Heljo, Olga, Olli

Helju is an Estonian feminine given name.

As of 1 January 2021, 1,282 women in Estonia have the first name Helju, making it the 141st most popular female name in the country. The average age of people bearing the name Helju is 78 years old, with a median age of 79. The name is most commonly found in Võru County, where 21.78 per 10,000 inhabitants of the county bear the name.

Individuals bearing the name Helju include:

- Helju Mikkel (1925–2017), Estonian folk dancer and choreographer
- Helju Rammo (1926–1998), Estonian children's writer and playwright
- Helju Rebane (born 1948), Estonian prose writer
- Helju Vals (1929–2011), Estonian editor and journalist
