= Reet Kasik =

Estonian linguist

Reet Kasik in 2018. Photo: Andres Tennus / University of Tartu

Reet Kasik (born 5 May 1946) is an Estonian linguist.

She was born in Tallinn. In 1969, she graduated from Tartu State University with a degree in Estonian philology. Since 1969, she has taught at the University of Tartu. She has also taught Estonian language in several universities in Finland.

She has investigated word forming of Estonian language (Estonian: eesti keele sõnamoodustus), teaching of Estonian language to foreigners, and language of journalism.

In 2018, she was given Wiedemann Language Award.

== Selected publications ==
- Mati Erelt, Reet Kasik, Helle Metslang et al., "Eesti keele grammatika 2. Süntaks". Tallinn: Eesti TA Keele ja Kirjanduse Instituut, 1993
- Reet Kasik, "Hakkame rääkima! Viron kielen peruskurssi". Turku, (5. edition 1994, 7. edition 1997)
- Mati Erelt, Reet Kasik, Helle Metslang jt., "Eesti keele grammatika 1. Morfoloogia, sõnamoodustus". Tallinn: Eesti TA Keele ja Kirjanduse Instituut, 1995
- Reet Kasik, "Johdatus viron kielen tutkimukseen" Helsinki : Suomalais-ugrilainen seura, Suomalais-ugrilainen laitos, 1999
- Reet Kasik, "Eesti keele sõnatuletus". Tartu: Tartu Ülikooli Kirjastus, 1996 (2., täiendatud ja parandatud trükk 2004, 3. parandatud trükk 2009)
- Reet Kasik, "Sissejuhatus tekstiõpetusse". Tartu: Tartu Ülikooli Kirjastus, 2007
- Reet Kasik, Mati Erelt, Tiiu Erelt, "Eesti keele väljendusõpetus kõrgkoolidele". Tallinn: M. Erelt, 2007
- Reet Kasik, "Stahli mantlipärijad: eesti keele uurimise lugu." Tartu: Tartu Ülikooli Kirjastus, 2011
- Reet Kasik, "Sõnamoodustus" ("Eesti keele varamu", 1.) Tartu: Tartu Ülikooli Kirjastus, 2015
