= Johannes Voldemar Veski =

Estonian linguist

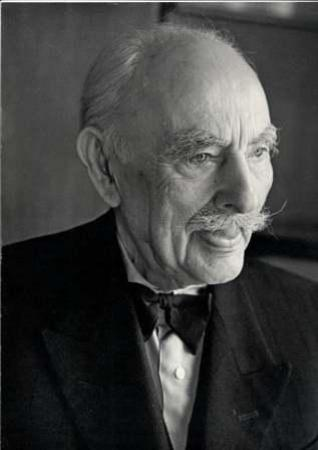
Johannes Voldemar Veski

Johannes Voldemar Veski (27 June 1873 Vaidavere, Tartu County – 28 March 1968 Tartu) was an Estonian linguist.

From 1896 until 1899, he studied at the University of Tartu; he initially studied religion and thereafter nature sciences. From 1920 until 1938, he taught at the University of Tartu. Veski was the editor of the journal Eesti Keel from 1936 to 1940.

In 1946 he became a member of Estonian Academy of Sciences. From 1946 to 1968, he was the chair of the Mother Tongue Society.

His activity was primarily related to developing Estonian language terminology and Estonian language planning. In total, he was an editor or compiler of 30 specialised dictionaries (all of them consist of about 150,000 terms).

== Awards ==
- 1938: Order of the White Star, Third Class
