= Julius Mägiste =

Estonian linguist

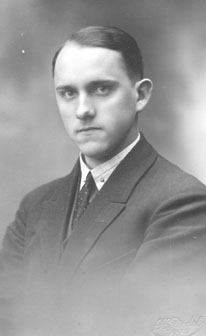
- In the 1920s
- Born: Julius Mälson; 19 December 1900; Kassema, Tartu County, Estonia, Russian Empire
- Died: 11 March 1978 (aged 77)
- Education: University of Tartu
- Occupation: Linguist
- Years active: 1925-1978

Julius Mägiste (born Julius Gustavi Mälson; 19 December 1900 – 11 March 1978) was an Estonian linguist. He was born in the village of Kassema, Tartu County. In 1923 he graduated from the University of Tartu. Since 1925, he taught at the University of Tartu. From 1934 to 1936, he was the head of Mother Tongue Society. In 1944, he fled to Germany and in 1945 to Sweden in Lund. Until 1967, he taught Finno-Ugric languages at Lund University.

== Biography ==
Mägiste was born into a farming family as Julius Gustavi Mälson (changed his name to Mägiste in 1922) in Kassema village, Tartu County within the Governorate of Estonia, which was a part of the Russian Empire on 19 December 1900. After Estonia's independence, he went on to study at the University of Tartu which he graduated in 1923. In 1925, he began teaching at the university and he then published his first work on the two Estonians dialects of Western Ingermanland. This thesis began in 1922 when he visited Ingermanland with support from the Mother Tongue Society. Mägiste's surveys were later published by Eesti Keel in 1922.

At age 28 (1928–1929), he was elected the Extraordinary Professor of Finnic Languages of the University of Tartu after the success of his 1925 thesis. Mägiste was the editor of the journal Eesti Keel from 1932 to 1935. In 1937, Mägiste finished a 250-page manuscript of West Ingrian texts along with a glossary. However, due to the Second World War, the manuscript was never published and was eventually lost.

=== World War II ===
As a result of the German invasion and subsequent conquest of Estonia from the Soviets, the fieldworkers for the University of Tartu were forced to join the German military list, which included Mägiste, but were still allowed to continue their fieldwork.

In 1943, while Estonia was under German occupation, Mägiste made a visit to West Ingria. This was after surveys undertaken by the Germans revealed the population of ethnic minorities in Ingria. This would later result in a collection of texts Mägiste published in 1959. Among the minorities studied by him in West Ingria included the Votians and Mordvins. His work on the Votian language later became a way to preserve the Votian language. Due to his involvement with the Germans and further Soviet advances into the Baltics, Mägiste fled Estonia for Germany in 1944 before then fleeing to Sweden.

== Publications ==
- "Rosona (Eesti Ingeri) murde pääjooned" (The main features of Rosona (Estonian Ingermanland) dialect)
- "Estnisches etymologisches Wörterbuch" (manuscript, 12 editions (Estonian: 12 köidet))
