= Juhan Ross =

Estonian atmospheric physicist

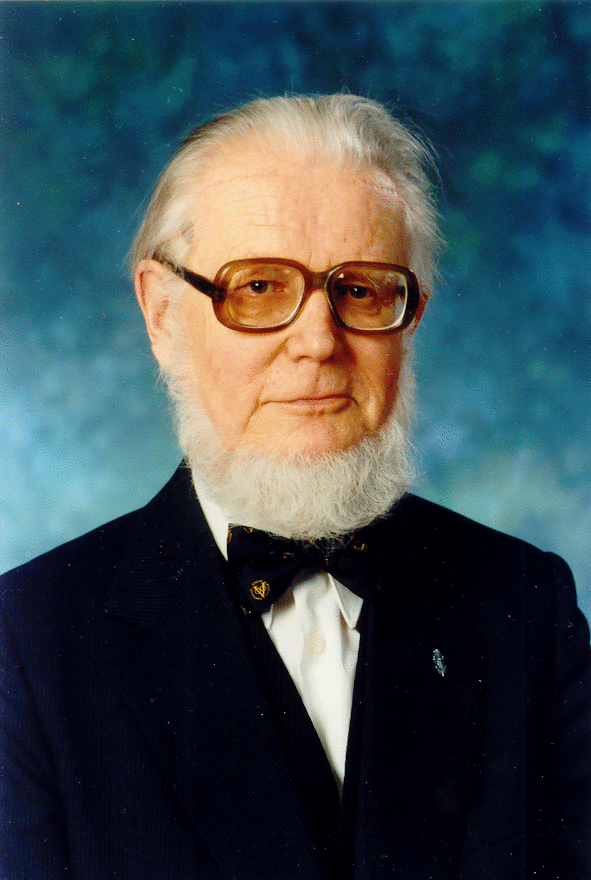
Juhan Ross

Juhan Ross (14 August 1925 Aburi, Virumaa – 21 June 2002) was an Estonian atmospheric physicist. He was focused on actinometric measurements related to vegetation canopy. He worked out the fundamental principles of phytoactinometry.

During World War II, he belonged to Finnish Infantry Regiment 200.

In 1951 he graduated from Tartu University in physics. After graduating he started to work at Tartu Observatory. From 1958 to 1991 he was the head of Department of Atmospheric Physics.

He was the author or co-author of six monographs. He published over 150 scientific articles.

Since 1993 he was a member of Estonian Academy of Sciences.

In 2001 he was awarded with Order of the White Star, III class. He was the father of Jaan Ross, a musicologist and psychologist.
