= Marja Kallasmaa =

Estonian linguist

Marja Kallasmaa (born 21 August 1950 in Kehra) is an Estonian linguist.

In 1975 she graduated from Tartu State University with a degree in Estonian philology. Since 1978, she has worked at the Estonian Language Institute.

Her main field of research has been onomastics. She is the leading onomastic in Estonia. In 1998 she laid the foundation to the database off Estonian toponyms. In late 2025, her H-index is 6.

She is an honorary member of the Mother Tongue Society.

== Awards ==
- 2017: Wiedemann Language Award.

== Works ==
Kallasmaa’s publications include;

- Small Dialect Dictionary (Part I 1982, Part II 1989) (contributor)
- Структура эстонской микротопонимии (на материале западного диалекта) (1981, manuscript)
- Saaremaa kohanimed I, II (1996, 2000)
- Läänemurde loodus- ja viljelusnimed (2003)
- Hiiumaa kohanimed (2010)
- Saaremaa rannasõnastik, with Tõnu Raudsepp and Kalle Kesküla
- Eesti kohanimeraamat, with Evar Saar and Peeter Päll
