= Girsh Blumberg =

Estonian-American physicist

- Born: February 6, 1959 (age 67); Viljandi, then part of Estonian SSR, Soviet Union
- Education: Tartu University
- Known for: Raman spectroscopy Superconductivity; Quantum magnetism
- Awards: Elected Fellow of the AAAS and APS
- Scientific career
- Fields: Condensed matter experiment
- Workplaces: Rutgers University
- Doctoral advisor: Ljubov A. Rebane

Girsh Blumberg is an Estonian-American physicist working in the experimental physics fields of condensed matter physics, spectroscopy, nano-optics, and plasmonics. Blumberg is an elected fellow of the American Physical Society (APS), an elected Fellow of the American Association for the Advancement of Science (FAAAS) , and a Distinguished Professor of Physics at Rutgers University.

Girsh Blumberg is best known for his contribution to electronic Raman scattering studies in strongly correlated electron systems, superconductors and quantum spin systems. He has co-authored over 100 publications and is inventor on over 30 patents in the fields of electronic and optical devices, spectroscopy and nano-plasmonics. He and his collaborators made the first observation of the Leggett mode in multiband superconductors, have observed Wigner crystallization in strongly interacting quantum spin ladder systems, have explained long-standing puzzle of the "Hidden Order" in URu_{2}Si_{2} heavy fermion compound, have made a discovery of the chiral spin waves on the surface of topological insulators, to name a few.

== Biography ==
Girsh Blumberg was raised in Viljandi, Estonia of educator parents, along with his two sisters Riina and Liia. Blumberg graduated from secondary school in 1976 with gold medal and then, in 1981, with M.Sc. cum laude from University of Tartu. He completed his Ph.D. in Physics and Mathematics from Physics Institute of the Estonian Academy of Sciences in 1987. Starting from 1981 he was first a research, and later a senior research scientist at the National Institute of Chemical Physics and Biophysics in Tallinn, Estonia. Between 1992 and 1998 Blumberg was Visiting Research Assistant Professor of the NSF Science and Technology Center for Superconductivity (NSF-STCS) at the University of Illinois at Urbana-Champaign. In 1998 he joined Bell Labs before joining the faculty at Rutgers University in 2008.
