= Henn Saari =

Estonian linguist (1924–1999)

- Born: 15 February 1924; Narva, Estonia
- Died: 8 September 1999 (aged 75); Tallinn, Estonia
- Education: University of Tartu
- Occupation: Linguist
- Years active: 1959–1999
- Awards: Wiedemann Language Award

Henn Saari (15 February 1924 – 8 September 1999) was an Estonian linguist.

== Early life and education ==
Saari was born on 15 February 1924 in Narva.

In 1963 he graduated from University of Tartu in Estonian philology. He worked at the journal Keel ja Kirjandus from 1959 to 1975. Since 1975 he was a senior research fellow at Estonian Language Institute.

== Career ==
His main fields of research were the theory of literary language, grammar of Estonian language, Estonian names, language management.

He became a member of the Mother Tongue Society in 1962 and was its chairman from 1990–1992.

He was one of the contributors to a Russian-Estonian dictionary published in 1984.

== Death ==
Saari died on 8 September 1999 in Tallinn.

== Awards ==
- 1989: He was the first winner of the Wiedemann Language Award.

== Works ==
- Kirjakeele teataja, 1976-1983: õigekeelsuskomisjoni otsused (with T. Erelt) (1985)
- Historische entlehnungssituationen des estnischen (1985)
- Opisanie slovoobrazovatelnykh elementov pri slozhnoi sisteme foneticheskikh cheredovanii: Estonskii iazyk (1987)
- Nimekirjutusraamat: vene, ukraina, valgevene, gruusia, armeenia, aserbaidžaani, kasahhi, kirgiisi, tadžiki, turkmeeni, usbeki (1993, one of the authors)
- Ein Weg zur Wortgrammatik am Beispiel des Estnischen = Tee sõnagrammatikale eesti keele näitel (1997)
