= Haldur Õim =

Estonian linguist

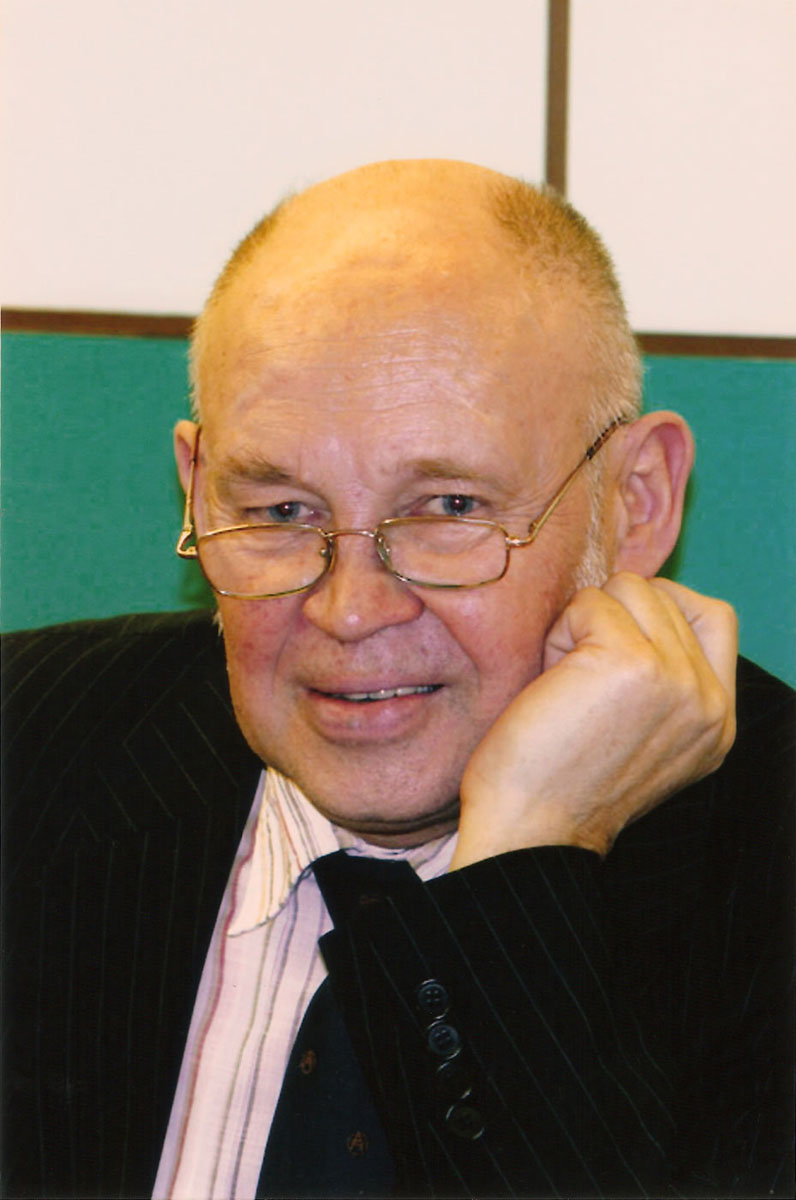
Haldur Õim in 2008

Haldur Õim (born 22 January 1942 in Helme Parish (now Tõrva Parish)) is an Estonian linguist.

In 1965 he graduated from Tartu State University in Estonian philology. Since 1969 he has taught at the Tartu of Tartu (since 1992, a professor). From 1981 until 1984, he taught Estonian language at the University of Helsinki.

His main fields of research have been theoretical linguistics, computational linguistics, semantics, pragmatics.

Since 1994 he is a member of Estonian Academy of Sciences.

Awards:

- 2001: Order of the White Star, IV class.
- 2005: Wiedemann Language Award

== Works ==
- Semantika (1974)
- Towards a theory of linguistic pragmatics. – Journal of Pragmatics 1977, 1, 2
- Inimene, keel ja arvuti ehk kompuuterlingvistika (1983)
- Language understanding and problem solving: on the relationiship between computational linguistics and artificial intelligence. – Computational Linguistics. An International Handbook (1989)
- Eesti keeleteadusliku mõtte areng XX sajandil. – Keel ja Kirjandus 2000, 7
- Eesti keele tehnoloogilised ressursid ja vahendid: arvutikorpused, arvutisõnastikud, keeletehnoloogiline tarkvara (2003, one of the authors)
- Estonian language technology – where do we stand? – Languages in development (2003, with E. Meister)
