= Tiiu Erelt =

Estonian linguist (born 1942)

Tiiu Erelt (until 1962 Tiiu Kask; born 20 April 1942 in Tallinn) is an Estonian linguist.

In 1965 she graduated from Tartu State University with a degree in Finno-Ugric languages. Her main fields of research have been Estonian terminology, dictionaries, lexicology, language planning, and the development of jargon in many disciplines.

from 1965 until 2009, she worked at the Estonian Language Institute. From 1977 until 1984, she taught a course in terminology at Tartu State University and in 1984 and 1986 at the Tallinn Pedagogical Institute in language planning.

In 1993, she lectured at the University of Helsinki. She has worked to clarify the terminology of patenting, construction, pedagogy, and linguistics, as well as professional titles. She participated in the compilation of Estonian orthography dictionaries, including as the editor and co-compiler of the 1999 and 2006 dictionaries and one of the compilers of the 1976 and 2013 dictionaries. She has also edited, among other things, volumes three and four of Vene-eesti sõnaraamatu (Russian–Estonian Dictionary).

She was married to linguist Mati Erelt. Their sons are the journalist Pekka Erelt and Jaan Erelt.

== Awards ==
- 1999: Wiedemann Language Award
- 2000: Research Prize of the Republic of Estonia
- 2001: Order of the White Star, IV class
- 2007: Honorary Member of the Mother Tongue Society

== Works ==
- Vene-eesti kutse- ja ametinimetuste sõnastik (1979, with A. Argal and K. Torop)
- Eesti oskuskeel (1982)
- Väike uudissõnastik (1983, 1989)
- Uudis- ja unarsõnu (1985, with R. Kull and H. Meriste)
- Eesti-soome keeleteaduse sõnastik (1992, 1995)
- Nimekirjutusraamat (1993, one of the authors)
- Eesti ortograafia (1995, 2005)
- Eesti keele käsiraamat (1997, 2007, with M. Erelt and K. Ross)
- Eesti keelekorraldus (2002)
- Eesti-inglise keeleteaduse sõnastik (2003, with M. Erelt and E. Velt)
- Eesti oskuskeelekorralduse seisund (2003, with A. Tavast)
- Terminiõpetus (2007)
- Keelenõuanne soovitab 1–4 (1996–2008, one of the authors)
