= Carl O. Nordling =

Finnish architect and urban planner

Carl O. Nordling (1919 – 15 February 2007) was a Finnish born architect, urban planner and amateur historian. He graduated as an architect from the Helsinki University of Technology in 1939 and immigrated to Sweden after the end of the Continuation War in 1944. Nordling published an article on the Holocaust, How Many Jews Died in the German Concentration Camps?, in the Holocaust denial publication Journal of Historical Review.

Nordling has also published an article entitled Did Stalin deliver his alleged speech of 19 August 1939? in the Journal of Slavic Military Studies.

As a statistician, he applied statistical methods to a number of scientific problems and published a large number of articles, mainly in his native Swedish. His most notable work is in scientific disciplines outside his professional expertise. Internationally he is best known for the small number of papers he published in English language peer reviewed scientific journals.

In his later years he wrote mainly about issues in Nordic and Germanic history, contributing among other to the debate on Shakespeare's identity.

== Publications ==
=== Books ===
- Gåtorna kring Birger jarl, Ösel och Borgå: Omvärdering av historiska teorier rörande svensk östpolitik och finsk och estnisk kolonisation under tidig medeltid Faktainformation (1976) ISBN 978-91-85494-00-2
- Den svenske Runeberg Ekenäs tryckeri aktiebolags förlag (1988) ISBN 978-951-9001-20-3

=== Journals ===
- A New Theory on the Cancer-inducing Mechanism, The British Journal of Cancer, 1953, Vol. VII, p. 68-72.
- The Jewish Establishment Under Nazi Threat and Domination 1938-1945 - The Journal of Historical Review, volume 10 no. 2 (Summer 1990), p. 195.
- How Many Jews Died in the German Concentration Camps? - The Journal of Historical Review, volume 11 no. 3 (Fall 1991), p. 335.
- The Location of the "Birca" - The Missionary Station of Bishop Ansgar - in the Scandinavian Journal of History, Volume 23 Number 1/2 1998
- The Death of Karl XII.(18th-century Swedish king) - in Scandinavian Studies, Volume 71 Number 1; Spring 1999
- Was There a Finnish Settlement in Uusimaa before the Swedish One? at Linguistica Uralica (2/2004)
- Did Stalin deliver his alleged speech of 19 August 1939?, in Journal of Slavic Military Studies, 19:93-106, 2006.
