= Hella Keem =

Estonian folklorist and linguist (1915–1997)

Hella Keem (also Hella Keem; 6 April 1915 Keema, Vaabina Parish – 27 December 1997 Tartu) was an Estonian linguist and ethnographer.

From 1936 until 1943, she studied Estonian language, ethnography, and Finno-Ugric languages at the University of Tartu. Following the German occupation of Estonia during World War II, Keem was arrested in 1943 and spent a year in prison. She was subsequently arrested in 1945 following the Soviet occupation of Estonia and spent fives years as a prisoner, released in 1950. From 1957 until 1993, she worked as a laboratory assistant at the Estonian SSR Academy of Sciences' Language and Literature Institute.

Her main fields of research were Tartu and Võro dialects. She was the most prolific dialect collector in Estonia: in total she created 223,000 labels of words, over 4000 pages of texts, and recorded 690 hours of sound recordings.

Awards:

- 1990: Wiedemann Language Award

== Works ==
- Tartu murde tekstid. Eesti murded III (1970)
- Tartumaa saja-aastaste jutud (1995)
- Võru keel (1997)
- Johannes Gutslaffi grammatika eesti keel ja Urvaste murrak (1998, in the book: J. Gutslaff. Grammatilisi vaatlusi eesti keelest)
- Võru murde tekstid. Eesti murded VI (2002, with I. Käsi)
