= Uuspõld =

Uuspõld is a surname. Notable people with the surname include:

- Ellen Uuspõld (1927–2019), Estonian linguist
- Jan Uuspõld (born 1973), Estonian stage
