= Jaan Ross =

Estonian musicologist and psychologist (1957–2026)

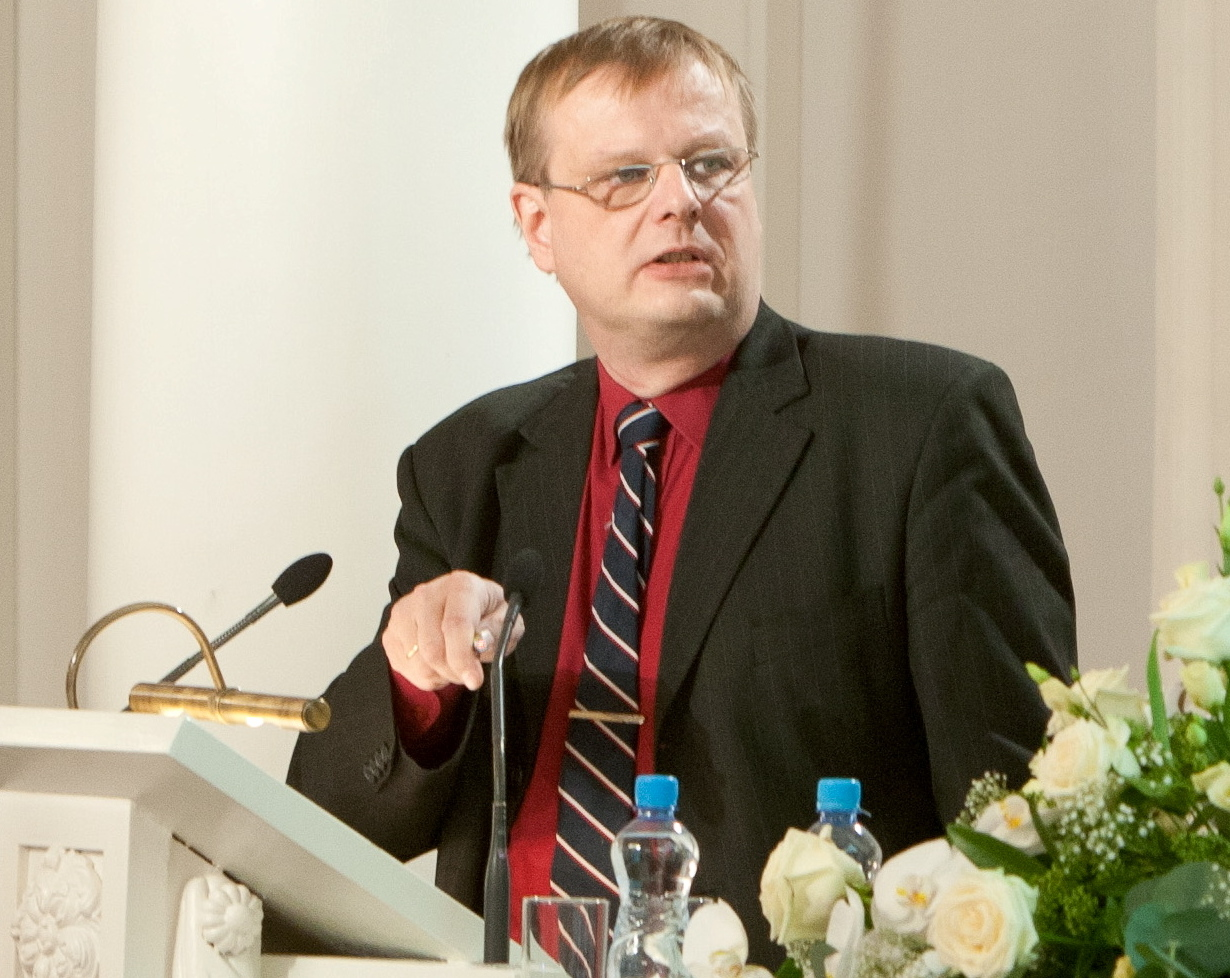
- Ross in 2010
- Born: 5 April 1957; Tartu, then part of Estonian SSR, Soviet Union
- Died: 18 January 2026 (aged 68)
- Education: University of Tartu; Åbo Akademi University
- Occupations: Musicologist, psychologist
- Spouse: Kristiina Ross
- Parent(s): Juhan Ross (father); Jaan Kross (father-in-law)

Jaan Ross (5 April 1957 – 18 January 2026) was an Estonian musicologist and psychologist. A member of the Estonian Academy of Sciences, he was a recipient of the Order of the White Star (2001).

Ross died on 18 January 2026, at the age of 68.
