= Kristiina Ross =

Estonian linguist and translator

- Born: 3 June 1955; Tallinn
- Alma mater: University of Tartu
- Employer: Institute of the Estonian Language
- Awards: Order of the White Star, 4th Class; Wiedemann Language Award (2007)

Kristiina Ross (born 3 June 1955 in Tallinn) is an Estonian linguist and translator.

== LIfe ==
In 1978 she graduated from Tartu State University in Estonian philology. Since 1978 she has been working at Estonian Language Institute. She has also worked at Estonian Humanitarian Institute.

Her main fields of research have been the grammar of Estonian language and other Finnic languages, Bible translations into Estonian.

Her father was the writer Jaan Kross, and she was the wife of Jaan Ross.

== Awards ==
- 2003: Order of the White Star, IV class
- 2007: Wiedemann Language Award

== Works ==
- Heebrea keel algajatele (1985)
- lnstruktiiv läänemeresoome keeltes (1988)
- Eesti keele käsiraamat (1997, 2007, with M. Erelt and T. Erelt)
- Esimene Moosese raamat. Iiobi raamat (2003, compilator)
- Common roots of the Latvian and Estonian literary languages (2008, one of the authors)
- Linguistic Ideas of the Lutheran Reformation in the Genesis of Literary Estonian. In: Kauko, Mikko; Norro, Miika; Nummila, Kirsi-Maria; Toropainen, Tanja; Fonsén Tuomo (Ed.). Languages in the Lutheran Reformation. Textual Networks and the Spread of Ideas. Amsterdam University Press, p. 57–77. (Crossing Boundaries: Turku Medieval and Early Modern Studies)
- Ross, Kristiina; Lohk, Ahti (2017). Words, Forms and Phrases in Estonian Folksongs and Hymns. Folklore: Electronic Journal of Folklore, 67, 49−64.10.7592/FEJF.
- Die Entstehung der estnischen Schriftsprache im Kontext der deutschen und estnischen Kulturgeschichte. Jahrbuch des Vereins für niederdeutsche Sprachforschung. Kiel/Hamburg: Wachholtz Verlag – Murmann Publishers, 2016, S. 57–68. (Niededeutsches Jahrbuch).
- Spuren einer mittelalterlichen estnischen Gemeinschaftssprache in frühprotestantischen Schriftzeugnissen. Kadri-Rutt Hahn, Matthias Thumser, Eberhard Winkler. Estnisches Mittelalter. Sprache – Gesellschaft – Kirche. Münster: LIT Verlag, 2015, S. 41–53. (Schriften der Baltischen Historischen Kommission; 20).
- Ross, Kristiina; Vanags, Pēteris (eds.). Common Roots of the Latvian and Estonian Literary Languages. Peter Lang Europäischer Verlag der Wissenschaften, 2008 .
