= Mari Must =

Estonian linguist

Mari Must (11 November 1920 Tartu – 20 February 2008) was an Estonian linguist. She was one of the most notable Estonian dialects researcher in Estonia.

In 1946 she graduated from Tartu State University. 1947-1992 she worked at Estonian SSR Academy of Sciences' Language and Literature Institute.

In 1957 she established the sound archive of Estonian language. She was the chief editor of the series Eesti murded.

Awards:

- 1998: Wiedemann Language Award
- 2001: Order of the White Star, V class.
