= Rudolf Karelson =

Estonian linguist

Rudolf Karelson (6 August 1929 Uulu Parish – 25 September 2006) was an Estonian linguist.

In 1954 he graduated from Tartu University in Estonian philology. Since 1961 he worked at Estonian Language Institute.

His main fields of research were vocabulary of Estonian literary language, grammar of Finnic languages. He was an editor of "Eesti keele seletav sõnaraamat" ('Explanatory dictionary of Estonian language'; (:et)).

Awards:

- 1993: Wiedemann Language Award
