= Andrus Saareste =

Estonian linguist (1892–1964)

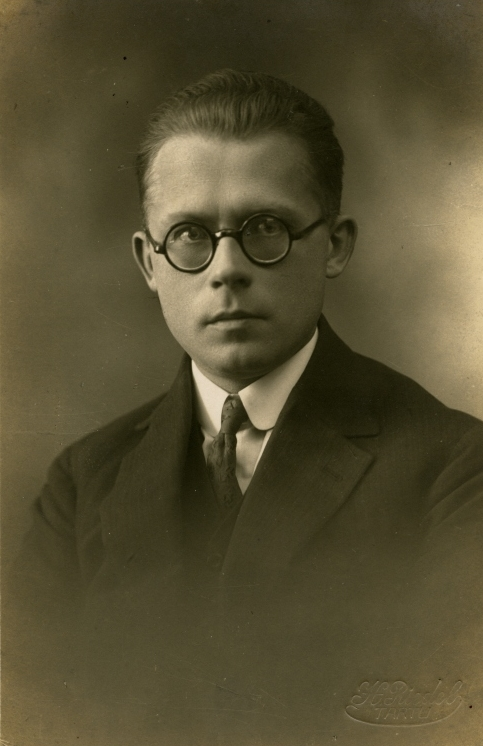
- Andrus Saareste (before 1933)
- Born: June 18, 1892; Tallinn, Estonia
- Died: May 11, 1964 (aged 71); Uppsala, Sweden
- Occupation: Linguist

Andrus Kustas Saareste (until 1921 Saaberk, Saaberg; until 1935 Albert Helmut Gustav; June 18, 1892 – May 11, 1964) was an Estonian linguist and dialectologist.

== Early life and education ==
Andrus Kustas Saareste was the son of the merchant Kustas Saareste (né Saberg, 1860–1929) and his wife Alma Julie Saberg (née Schneider, 1872–?). He graduated from Tallinn Alexander High School in 1912, then studied at the University of Tartu from 1912 to 1913 and at the University of Helsinki from 1913 to 1917, and from 1919 back at the University of Tartu, graduating in 1921 with a master's degree in Estonian. In 1924, he defended his doctoral dissertation on Estonian dialects (Leksikaalseist vahekordadest eesti murretes, I. Analüüs 'On Lexical Relations in Estonian Dialects, I. Analysis'), published in the same year in the series Acta et Commentationes Universitatis Dorpatensis (B VI.1).

== Career ==
From 1917 to 1919, Saareste was a secondary school teacher in Tallinn. In 1919 he participated in the War of Independence, and then from 1920 to 1925 he was a teacher at Tartu Normal School and Tartu Science High School. In 1925 he was an assistant professor at the University of Tartu, from 1925 to 1928 an associate professor of Estonian, and from 1928 to 1941 a full professor. From 1940 to 1941, he was a department head, and he became a research fellow in 1942. From 1935 to 1936 he was also a visiting professor at Royal Hungarian Pázmány Péter University.

Saareste served as the editor-in-chief of the journal Eesti Keel (Estonian Language) from 1924 to 1931. He was intermittently the chairman of the Mother Tongue Society from 1925 onward, the director of the Estonian Language Archive of the University of Tartu from 1931 to 1939, and the head of the department for the 1932 Eesti Entsüklopeedia (Estonian Encyclopedia).

In 1944 he fled to Germany. From there he moved to Sweden in 1945, where he was an archival assistant from 1945 to 1947, and he also gave lectures on Estonian at the University of Copenhagen. From 1947 to 1964 was a state scholar at Uppsala University. In Sweden, he participated in the activities of several organizations, including the Estonian Research Institute and the Estonian Scientific Society in Sweden.

== Research ==
Saareste established a solid research-based foundation for teaching Estonian at the University of Tartu. He lectured on Estonian dialects and the phonetic history of Estonian, as well as morphology, and later on general linguistics. Saareste organized the systematic collection of Estonian dialect material, and he performed a great deal of work on compiling an Estonian dialect atlas and a conceptual dictionary.

Saareste studied the vocabulary of Estonian, the history of standard Estonian, and especially Estonian dialects. He founded and led systematic work on collecting and studying dialect material, and he was also a founder and leader of academic research on and teaching of Estonian. In the mid-1930s, he began collecting Estonian surnames. The most important results of his research were the compilation of a dialect atlas and a conceptual dictionary, as well as a series of works on the nature and history of Estonian.

From 1922, Saareste was the head of the language committee of the Estonian Literary Society, and from 1924 to 1939 the vice-chairman of the society. From 1930 to 1935, he was a member of the Ministry of Education's school textbook teaching committee. He was a member of the Council of Toponyms established in 1938, a member of the board of the French Research Institute, a member of the Paris Linguistics Society, and a foreign member of the Finno-Ugrian Society.

Saareste translated French literature (Gustave Flaubert, Voltaire, and Alphonse Daudet) into Estonian. He authored over 70 research publications.

== Awards and recognitions ==
- 1939: Order of the Estonian Red Cross, third class

== Works ==
- 1917: Vigala murde peajooned (Main Features of the Vigala Dialect). Helsinki
- 1921: Murdesõnad Põhja-Eestist (Dialect Words from Northern Estonia). Tartu
- 1927–1931: Valik eesti kirjakeele vanemaid mälestusi (A Selection of Older Material in Standard Estonian; coauthor Arno Rafael Cederberg). 2 vols., Tartu
- 1932: Eesti keeleala murdelisest liigendusest (The Dialect Structure of the Estonian Language Area). Tartu
- 1932: Die estnische Sprache (Estonian). Tartu
- 1934: Eesti keel XIII–XVI sajandil (Estonian in the 13th to 16th Centuries). Tartu
- 1938: Eesti murdeatlas (Estonian Dialect Atlas), vol. 1. Tartu (1941: vol. 2, Tartu)
- 1948: Eesti keel Rootsi-Poola ajal (Estonian during the Swedish–Polish Period). Tartu
- 1952: Kaunis emakeel (A Beautiful Native Language), vol. 1. Lund (1959: vol. 2, Stockholm)
- 1955: Petit atlas des parlers estoniens (Small Estonian Dialect Atlas). Uppsala
- 1956–1968: Eesti keele mõisteline sõnaraamat (Estonian Semantic Dictionary), 4 vols. Stockholm (1979: Index)
- 1965: Introduction to Estonian Linguistics (coauthor Alo Raun). Wiesbaden
