= Valdek Pall =

Estonian linguist

- Born: 30 June 1927
- Died: 17 April 2013
- Children: 3
- Parents: Mrs. Pall; Mr. Pall

Valdek Pall (30 June 1927 Laius-Tähkvere Parish, Tartu County – 17 April 2013) was an Estonian linguist.

In 1952 he graduated from Tartu State University. 1957–1992 he worked at Estonian SSR Academy of Sciences' Language and Literature Institute.

His main fields of research were Estonian toponyms, Mordvinic languages. He also managed and directed investigations of Estonian dialects.

Awards:

- 2002: Wiedemann Language Award

== Works ==
- Ajad ja kõneviisid mordva keeltes (1955, manuscript)
- Põhja-Tartumaa kohanimed I–II (1969, 1977)
- ldamurde sõnastik (1994)
- Ersa keel. Õpiku konspekt ja sõnaloend (1996)
- L'em't'n'e (1997)
