= Estonian Physical Society =

Organization based in Estonia

Estonian Physical Society (Eesti Füüsika Selts)
- Abbreviation: EFS
- Formation: 19 May 1989
- Region served: Estonia
- President: Kaido Reivelt
- Website: http://www.fyysika.ee/efs/

The Estonian Physical Society (Eesti Füüsika Selts, EFS) is a voluntary not-for-profit research society bringing together all those active in physics in Estonia. The EFS was established in 1989 and is affiliated with the Estonian Academy of Sciences (Eesti Teaduste Akadeemia) and is a European Physical Society Member Society.

== Presidents of the Estonian Physical Society ==
Kaido Reivelt (University of Tartu) is the current president (since 2007). The first president of the Society was Jaak Aaviksoo, followed later by Piret Kuusk (1998–2001), Raivo Jaaniso (2001–2004), and Arvo Kikas (2004–2007).

== Honorary members ==
- Henn Käämbre
- Karl Rebane
- Harald Keres
- Jaan Einasto
- Piret Kuusk

== Awards ==
The society gives several awards:

- Annual Award: in recognition of theoretical, experimental, or an area of physics research results. The award is published in the Annals of the Estonian Physical Society;
- A certificate of honor status: for promoting physics in Estonia;
- Two student awards for research and for the promotion of physics.

== Publications ==
- Annals of the Estonian Physical Society (ISSN 1406-0574)
