= Richard Villems =

Estonian geneticist

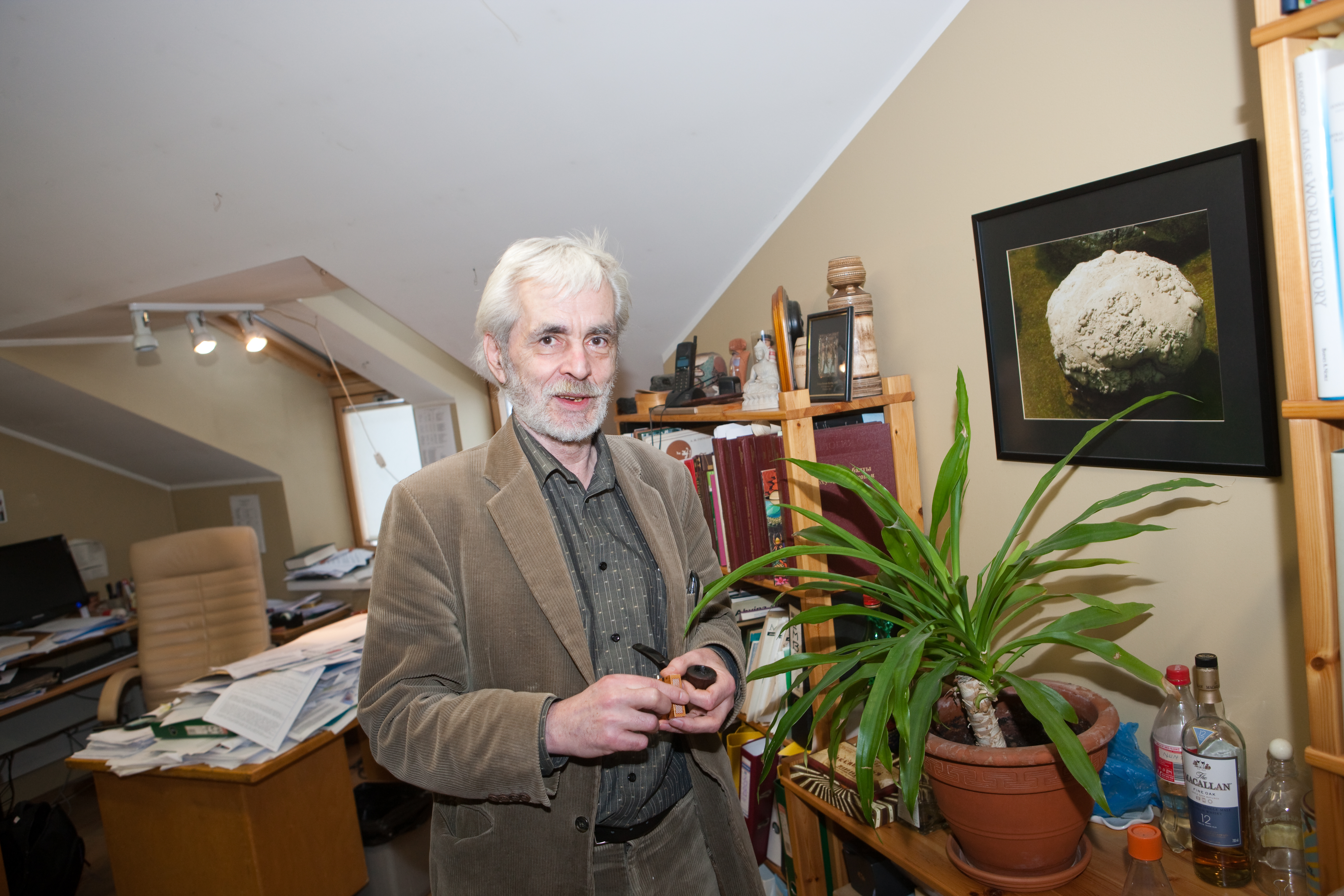
Richard Villems

Richard Villems (born 28 November 1944 in Pärnu) is an Estonian geneticist.

== Biography ==
From 2004 to 2014, he was President of Estonian Academy of Sciences. From 2009 to 2014, he was Director of Estonian Biocentre.

In 2014–2017, he was a leading researcher at the Estonian Biocentre, and in 2018–2020, he was a leading researcher in population genetics at the Institute of Genomics at the University of Tartu. He is currently the head of the Department of Evolutionary Biology at the Institute of Molecular and Cell Biology at the University of Tartu, a professor of archaeogenetics, and a professor of population genetics at the Institute of Genomics at the University of Tartu. In the Spring of 2008, Villems was a Residential Fellow at the Swedish Collegium for Advanced Study in Uppsala, Sweden.
