= Rätsep =

Family name

Origin
- Language: Estonian
- Meaning: tailor
- Region of origin: Estonia

Rätsep is an Estonian surname meaning tailor. As of 1 January 2020, 806 people had the surname Rätsep in Estonia: 385 men and 421 women. Rätsep is ranked as the 105th most common surname form men, and the 104th most common surname for women in Estonia. It is most commonly found in Hiiu County. People bearing the surname Rätsep include:

- Huno Rätsep (1927–2026), linguist
- Jüri Rätsep (1935–2018), lawyer, politician, and judge
- Tõnis Rätsep (born 1947), actor, musician, educator, poet, and playwright
- Väino Rätsep (1928–2023), oncologist
