= Mart Saarma =

Estonian molecular biologist

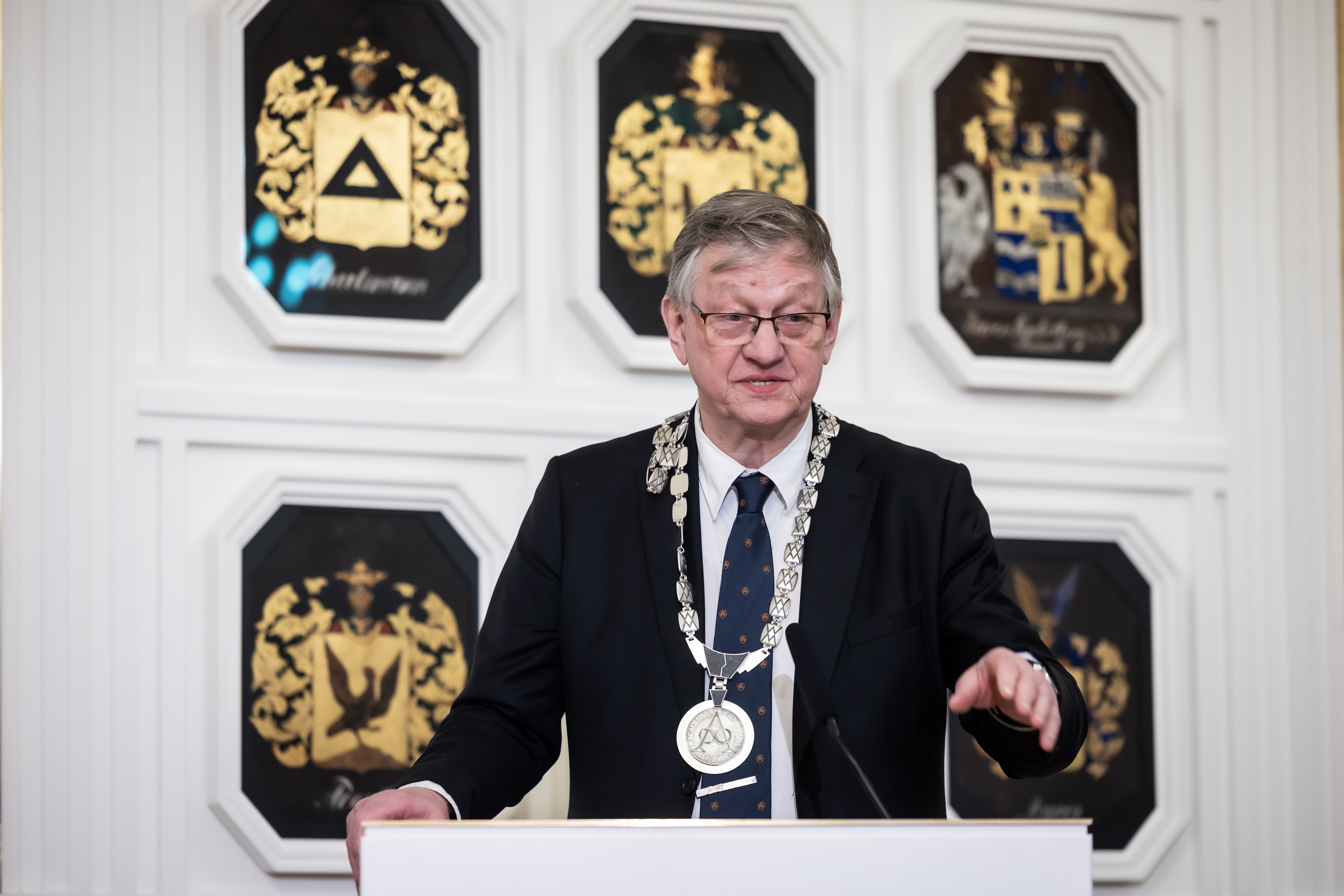
Mart Saarma

Mart Saarma (born 29 June 1949) is an Estonian molecular biologist, member of the Estonian Academy of Sciences.

== Biography ==
Saarma was born in Tartu. He is the third child of the professors of the medical department of Tartu University – Jüri Saarma (psychiatrist) and Valve Erika Saarma (gastroenterologist). He has worked in Moscow, Helsinki and Basel. His main research is dedicated to plant viruses and virus resistance, the development of the nervous system and the mechanisms of the death of nerve cells and the possibilities to use nerve growth factors in case of treating neurodegenerative diseases.
