= Pent Nurmekund =

Estonian linguist and polyglot

- Nurmekund in May 1965 (aged 58)
- Born: Arthur Roosmann; 16 December 1906; Kilingi-Nõmme, Estonia
- Died: 28 December 1996 (aged 90); Tartu, Estonia
- Spouse: Salme Nigol

Academic work
- Discipline: Linguist
- Institutions: University of Tartu

Pent Nurmekund (16 December 1906 – 28 December 1996) was an Estonian linguist and polyglot. He could read over eighty languages.

== Life ==
Nurmekund came from a poor peasant family and first attended school at the age of twelve.

From 1930 to 1935, he studied Romance and Germanic philology at Tartu University, and graduated with a Magister Philosophiae.

In 1935, he became a founding member of the Estonian Oriental Society.

From 1955 to 1986, he was a lecturer at Tartu University, and in the 1950s founded the Oriental department there.

In 1991, he received the Wiedemann Language Award.
