= Arno Köörna =

Estonian economist

Arno Köörna (2 February 1926 Nõo, Tartu County – 21 December 2017) was a Soviet and Estonian economist.

He became a member of Estonian Academy of Sciences in 1972. From 1990 to 1994, he was the president of Estonian Academy of Sciences.

== Awards ==
- Medal of Estonian Academy of Sciences
- Order of the Red Banner of Labour (1976)
- Order of Friendship of Peoples (1986)
- Order of the White Star, 3rd class
