= Heljo =

Female given name

- Gender: Female
- Language: Estonian
- Name day: 31 May

Origin
- Region of origin: Estonia

Other names
- Related names: Elga, Helga, Helge, Helgi, Helja, Helje, Helju, Olga, Olli

Heljo is an Estonian feminine given name.

As of 1 January 2021, 324 women in Estonia have the first name Heljo, making it the 396th most popular female name in the country. The name is most commonly found in Jõgeva County, where 4.60 per 10,000 inhabitants of the county bear the name.

People with the name include:

- Heljo Mänd (1926–2020), Estonian children's writer, novelist, newspaper editor and poet
- Heljo Pikhof (born 1958), Estonian politician
- Heljo Sepp (1922–2015), Estonian pianist, music teacher and emeritus professor
- Heljo Talmet (1922–1974), Estonian folk dance pedagogue
