= Eesti Keel =

Estonian journal (1922–1940)

- Discipline: Linguistics
- Language: Estonian

Publication details
- History: 1922–1940
- Frequency: 6 to 8 issues per year

Standard abbreviations
- ISO 4: Eesti Keel

Eesti Keel (Estonian Language) was a journal of the Estonian Academic Mother Tongue Society published in Tartu, Estonia, from 1922 to 1940.

== History ==
The journal published six to eight issues per year. The journal's print run was 1,100 to 1,500 in the 1920s, and 400 to 450 in the 1930s. The journal published articles on standard Estonian, dialects, languages related to Estonian, and other linguistic topics. In 1940, the journal Eesti Keel ja Kirjandus (Estonian Language and Literature) was established through the merger of the journals Eesti Keel and Eesti Kirjandus (Estonian Literature).

== Editors ==
The editors-in-chief of Eesti Keel were:

- 1922–1924: Julius Mark
- 1924–1931: Andrus Saareste
- 1932–1935: Julius Mägiste
- 1936–1940: Johannes Voldemar Veski
