= Ljubov Rebane =

Estonian physicist

- Born: September 6, 1929; Leningrad, USSR
- Died: June 13, 1991 (aged 61)
- Education: Leningrad University
- Known for: Raman spectroscopy, superconductivity, spectral hole burning
- Scientific career
- Fields: Condensed matter experiment
- Workplaces: National Institute of Chemical Physics and Biophysics
- Doctoral students: Girsh Blumberg

Ljubov A. Rebane (née Chagalova) (September 6, 1929 Leningrad – June 13, 1991 Tallinn) was an Estonian physicist. She graduated from Leningrad University in 1952 and received a PhD in Physics and Mathematics in 1961 from the same university.

She received the USSR State Prize (Russian: Госуда́рственная пре́мия СССР) in 1986, together with Rein Avarmaa, Anšel Gorohhovski, Roman Personov, Boris Harlamov, Jevgeni Alšits, Ljudmila Bõkovskaja, Vladimir Maslov, Jaak Kikas and Konstantin Solovjov, for the cycle of articles "High-spectral-resolution spectroscopy and for the persistent spectral hole burning of molecules and solids" (Russian: Авармаа, Рейн Арнольдович, зав. сектором, Гороховский, Аншель Александрович, Кикас, Яак Вернерович, ст. н. с., Альшиц, Евгений Иосифович, Быковская, Людмила Анатольевна, мл. н. с. Института физики АН ЭССР; Маслов, Владимир Григорьевич, ст. н. с. ГОИ имени С. И. Вавилова; Ребане, Любовь Александровна, ст. н. с. ИХБФАН ЭССР; Соловьёв, Константин Николаевич, зав. лабораторией Института физики АН БССР, — за цикл работ «Фотовыжигание стабильных спектральных провалов и гелективная спектроскопия сложных молекул» (1972—1984)).

== Family ==
She married the physicist Karl Rebane. Their children Aleksander and Inna Rebane both became physicists themselves.
