= Estonian Semiotics Association =

Organization based in Estonia

Estonian Semiotics Association (Estonian: Eesti Semiootika Selts) is an Estonian voluntary association, which connects semioticians in Estonia.

The association publishes the publication Acta Semiotica Estica.

The association is the member of International Association for Semiotic Studies (IASS). The association is also the associated member for Estonian Academy of Sciences.
