= Wiedemann Language Award =

Estonian language award

Wiedemann Language Award (Estonian: Wiedemanni keelauhind, full name The State F. J. Wiedemann Language Award) is an Estonian state award which is granted each year to one natural person for outstanding merits upon study, organisation, teaching, promotion or use of the Estonian language.

== Recipients ==
- 1989 – Henn Saari
- 1990 – Hella Keem, Erich Raiet
- 1991 – Pent Nurmekund
- 1992 – Rein Kull, Valev Uibopuu
- 1993 – Rudolf Karelson, Uno Liivaku
- 1994 – Nikolai Baturin, Paul Saagpakk
- 1995 – Lennart Meri
- 1996 – Juhan Peegel
- 1997 – Eduard Leppik
- 1998 – Mari Must, Huno Rätsep
- 1999 – Tiiu Erelt, Uno Mereste
- 2000 – Ellen Uuspõld
- 2001 – Ülle Viks, Eduard Vääri
- 2002 – Valdek Pall
- 2003 – Mati Hint, Helju Vals
- 2004 – Viivi Maanso
- 2005 – Haldur Õim
- 2006 – Heldur Niit
- 2007 – Kristiina Ross
- 2008 – Mati Erelt
- 2009 – Ilse Lehiste
- 2010 – Ain Kaalep
- 2011 – Tiit-Rein Viitso
- 2012 – Mari Tarand
- 2013 – Valve-Liivi Kingisepp
- 2014 – Arvo Krikmann
- 2015 – Leelo Tungal
- 2016 – Uno Laur
- 2017 – Marja Kallasmaa
- 2018 – Reet Kasik
- 2019 – Krista Kerge
- 2020 – Helle Metslang
- 2021 – Jüri Viikberg
- 2022 – Mare Koit
- 2023 – Peeter Päll
- 2024 – Hando Runnel
