= Huno Rätsep =

Estonian linguist (1927–2026)

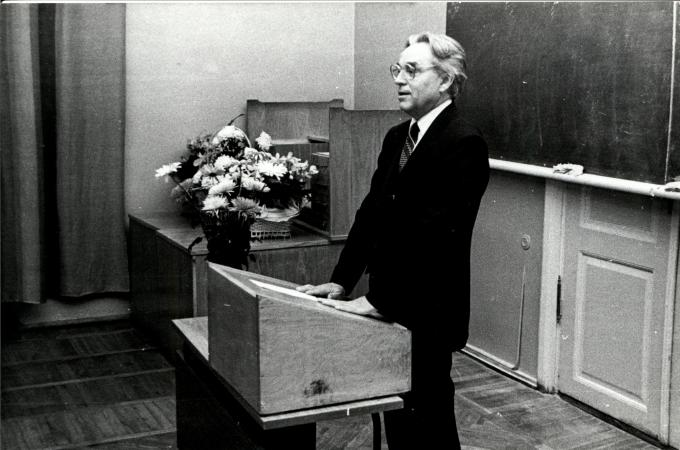
Huno Rätsep in c. 1987

Huno Rätsep (28 December 1927 – 26 June 2026) was an Estonian linguist.

== Life and career ==
Rätsep was born in Tartu on 28 December 1927. In 1951 he graduated from Tartu State University. Since 1953 he taught at the University of Tartu. Since 1977, he taught there as a professor.

His main fields of research were structural linguistics and generative grammar, and grammar of the Estonian language.

From 1981 he was a member of Estonian Academy of Sciences. From 1982 to 1989 he was the chairperson of the Mother Tongue Society.

Rätsep died on 26 June 2026, at the age of 98.

== Awards ==
- 1998: Wiedemann Language Award
- 2001: Order of the White Star, IV class.

== Works ==
- Eesti keele ajalooline morfoloogia I (1977, 1982)
- Eesti keele lihtlausete tüübid (1978)
- Eesti keele ajalooline morfoloogia II (1979)
- Sõnaloo raamat (2002)
