= Lydia Vasikova =

Russian Finno-Ugric linguist

Lydia Petrovna Vasikova
- Born: 28 May 1927; Gornomariysky District, Mari Autonomous Soviet Socialist Republic, Russian Soviet Federative Socialist Republic, Soviet Union
- Died: 28 October 2012 (aged 85); Yoshkar-Ola, Russia
- Citizenship: Soviet Union, Russia
- Education: Doctor of Sciences
- Alma mater: Mari State University – Mari State Pedagogical Institute named after N.K. Krupskaya
- Scientific career
- Fields: Professor, Philologist
- Workplaces: Mari State University
- Academic advisors: Paul Ariste
- Notable students: Andrey Alekseevich Utyatin

Lydia Petrovna Vasikova (May 28, 1927 – October 28, 2012) was a Soviet and Russian Finno-Ugric linguist, the first among Mari women, who became a Doctor of Science (1985), a professor (1986), an Honored Scientist of the Russian Federation (1995), and a holder of the Order of the Cross of the Land of Mary (Estonia).

== Biography ==
She was born on May 28, 1927, in the village of Pernyangashi of the Paygusovsky rural settlement of the Gornomariysky District of the Mari ASSR.

- 1946–1950 – She studied at the department of the Mari language of the Faculty of History and Philology of the Mari State Institute named after N. K. Krupskaya.
- 1951–1954 – She studied at the graduate school of the University of Tartu (Estonia) under the supervision of academician Paul Ariste.
- She worked at the Mari Pedagogical Institute (taught the Mari language) and at the Department of Philology of the Estonian Agricultural Academy in Tartu, and then again at the Department of Russian Language at the Mari Pedagogical Institute.
- 1984 – She defended her doctoral dissertation at the University of Tartu on the topic of "Compound sentences in the modern Mari literary language in comparison with other types of sentences."
- Since 1984, she worked at the Mari State University at the Department of Russian and General Linguistics as a professor, and as head of the department. She was also the head of a research laboratory.
- 1986 – She became a professor at the Mari State University, the first among Mari women.

On October 28, 2012, she died in an accident on the 14th kilometer of the Yoshkar-Ola – Kozmodemyansk road.

Vasikova is the author of over 193 scientific publications, including 10 monographs in the field of Russian and general linguistics, contact linguistics, sociolinguistics, and Mari linguistics. Her textbooks on the Mari and Russian languages are used by university and school teachers. She was a member of the specialized council for the defense of candidate and doctoral dissertations in the Finno-Ugric languages. Vasikova was the author of a spelling dictionary for the Hill Mari language and the monographs "Basic syntax of a simple sentence in the Russian language" (1980) and "Complex syntax in the modern Mari literary language (1982)."

== Awards and recognition ==
- Medal "For Valiant Labor in the Great Patriotic War 1941-1945."
- Honored Scientist of the Mari ASSR (1988)
- Honored Scientist of the Russian Federation (1995)
- Order of the Cross of the Land of Mary, 5th Class (Estonia, February 2, 2001)
- Certificate of Merit of the Republic of Mari El (2002)
