= Eduard Vääri =

Estonian linguist

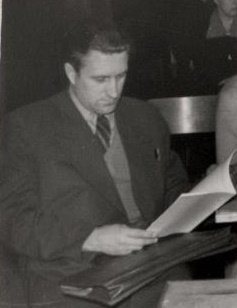
Image of Eduard Vääri

Eduard Vääri (26 June 1926 – 17 May 2005) was an Estonian linguist.

Vääri was born in Lapetukme, Valguta Parish. In 1950 he graduated from Tartu University. Since 1951 he taught at Tartu University; from 1978 he was a professor. 1976-1978 he taught Estonian language at Helsinki University.

His main fields of research were: Livonian language and culture, general linguistics, teaching of Estonian language.

In 1999 he established the organization Estonian Language Protection Association (Estonian: Eesti Keele Kaitse Ühing).

Awards:

- 2001: Wiedemann Language Award
- 2004: Order of the White Star, IV class.
