= Estonian Biocentre =

Genetics and genomics research institute in Tartu, Estonia

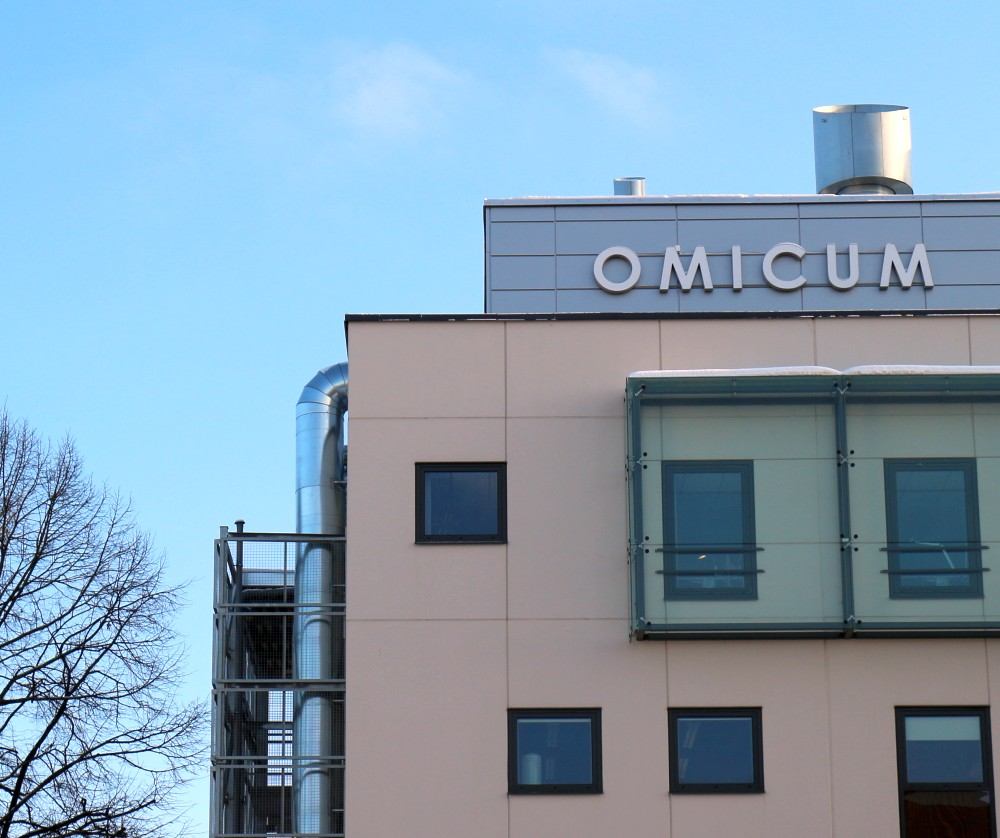
"Omicum": Building of the Estonian Genome Centre and Institute of Molecular and Cell Biology at the University of Tartu in Tartu, Estonia.

The Estonian Biocentre (EBC; Estonian: Eesti Biokeskus) is a genetics and genomics research institute located in Tartu, Estonia. It's a joint venture between the University of Tartu and the National Institute of Chemical Physics and Biophysics. The goal of the EBC is to promote research and technological development (RTD) in gene and cell technologies in Estonia. The EBC is regulated by a nine-member Scientific Council, comprising researchers from the EBC and external members, and is advised by an international Advisory Board, currently consisting of five members from different countries.

The EBC was established in 1986, and the current director is Prof. Richard Villems.

== See also ==
- Estonian Genome Project
