= Estonianization =

Changing of names from other languages into Estonian

Estonianisation is the changing of one's personal names from other languages into Estonian. Less often, the term has also been applied to the development of the Estonian language, culture, and identity within educational and other state institutions through various programmes.

== Family names ==
Before 1918, when Estonia became an independent country, around half of the country's ethnic Estonian population carried foreign-language (mostly German) or "foreign-sounding", i.e., non-Estonian surnames. In the 1920s, and especially in the 1930s, the government promoted a nationwide voluntary surname Estonianization campaign. During the campaign, about 200.000 of Estonian citizens chose a new surname to replace their original family name. A smaller part of the people also Estonianized their first name(s) at the same time. A similar process took place in Finland in the early 20th century.

The Estonianization of names stopped almost completely after the Soviet occupation and annexation of Estonia in 1940.

=== Notable Estonianized surnames ===
- Paul Berg → Paul Ariste
- Eduard Brunberg → Eduard Bornhöhe
- Karl August Einbund → Kaarel Eenpalu
- Erhard-Voldemar Esperk → Ants Eskola
- Miina Hermann → Miina Härma
- Hans Laipman → Ants Laikmaa
- Friedebert Mihkelson → Friedebert Tuglas
- Kristjan Trossmann → Kristjan Palusalu
- Konstantin Türnbaum → Konstantin Türnpu

A number of ethnic Russians took Estonian surnames as well:

- Alexey Dolgoshev → Alexis Rannit
- Georgi Kuznetsov → Jüri Järvet
- Vassili Krassikov → Vello Kaaristo

== Integration ==
After the end of the 1944–1991 Soviet occupation of Estonia, following the restoration of the country's full independence in 1991, the Estonian government has pursued an "integration policy" (informally referred to as "Estonianisation") that has aimed at strengthening Estonian identity among the population, developing shared values and "pride in being a citizen of Estonia", and respecting and accepting cultural differences among the residents of Estonia.

=== Education ===
On 14 March 2000, the Government of Estonia adopted "State Programme: Integration in Estonian society 2000-2007". The main areas and aims of the integration established by the program are linguistic-communicative, legal-political, and socio-economic. The Program has four sub-programs: education; the education and culture of national minorities; the teaching of Estonian to adults; and social competence. The aim of the sub-programs is to be achieved via the learning of the Estonian language by children and adults.

== See also ==
- Lists of most common surnames in European countries § Estonia
- et:Perekonnanimede kaitseregister, Estonian Family Name Protection Register
