= Aburi, Estonia =

Village in Estonia

Aburi
- Village
- Location within Estonia
- Coordinates: 59°10′56″N 26°16′17″E
- Country: Estonia
- County: Lääne-Viru County
- Parish: Väike-Maarja Parish
- Time zone: UTC+2 (EET)
  - Summer (DST): UTC+3 (EEST)

Aburi is a village in Väike-Maarja Parish, Lääne-Viru County, in northeastern Estonia.

== Notable people ==
- Juhan Ross (1925-) -physicist
