= Helju Rebane =

Estonian writer

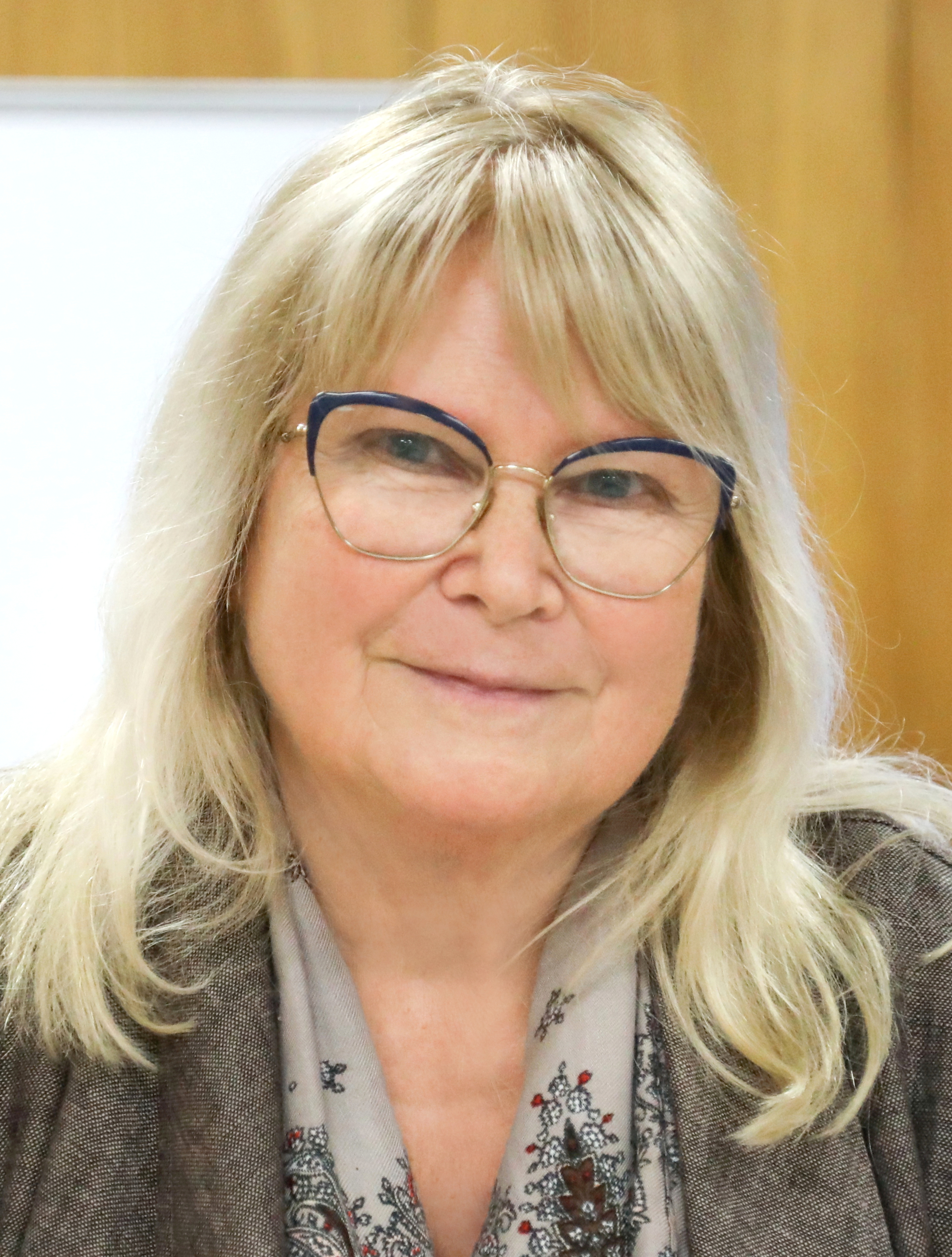
Helju Rebane in 2019

Helju Rebane (born 18 July 1948) is an Estonian writer. She writes mainly prose and science fiction in the Estonian and Russian languages.

She was born in Tallinn. Her father was philosopher Jaan Rebane and her uncles were physicist and former president of the Academy of Sciences of the ESSR Karl Rebane, physicist Toomas Rebane, and mathematician Jüri Rebane. She graduated from Tartu State University Tartu with a degree in theoretical mathematics in 1971. From 1972 until 1973, she worked in the department of logic and psychology at the university. Later she studied logic at Moscow University. In Moscow, she was as a lecturer at the Institute of Management Problems of the Scientific and Technical Committee of the USSR from 1974 until 1980, and as a senior engineer at the Ministry of Health Computing Center from 1981 until 1983.

Rebane made her writing debut in the journal Looming in 1981 with the story Väike kohvik. In 1983 she won a prize in the story competition run by the literary journal Noorus.

== Works ==
- 1986 story "Väike kohvik". Eesti Raamat, 110 pp
- 2011 "Город на Альтрусе: фантастическая повесть и рассказы". Воронеж, 2011. 207 pp
- 2017 "50 рассказов". Москва: Ridero, 288 pp
- 2017 "Кот в лабиринте: рассказы". Москва: Ridero, 207 pp
- 2021 story "Õige valik". Fantaasia, 181 pp
