= Kaido Reivelt =

Estonian physicist

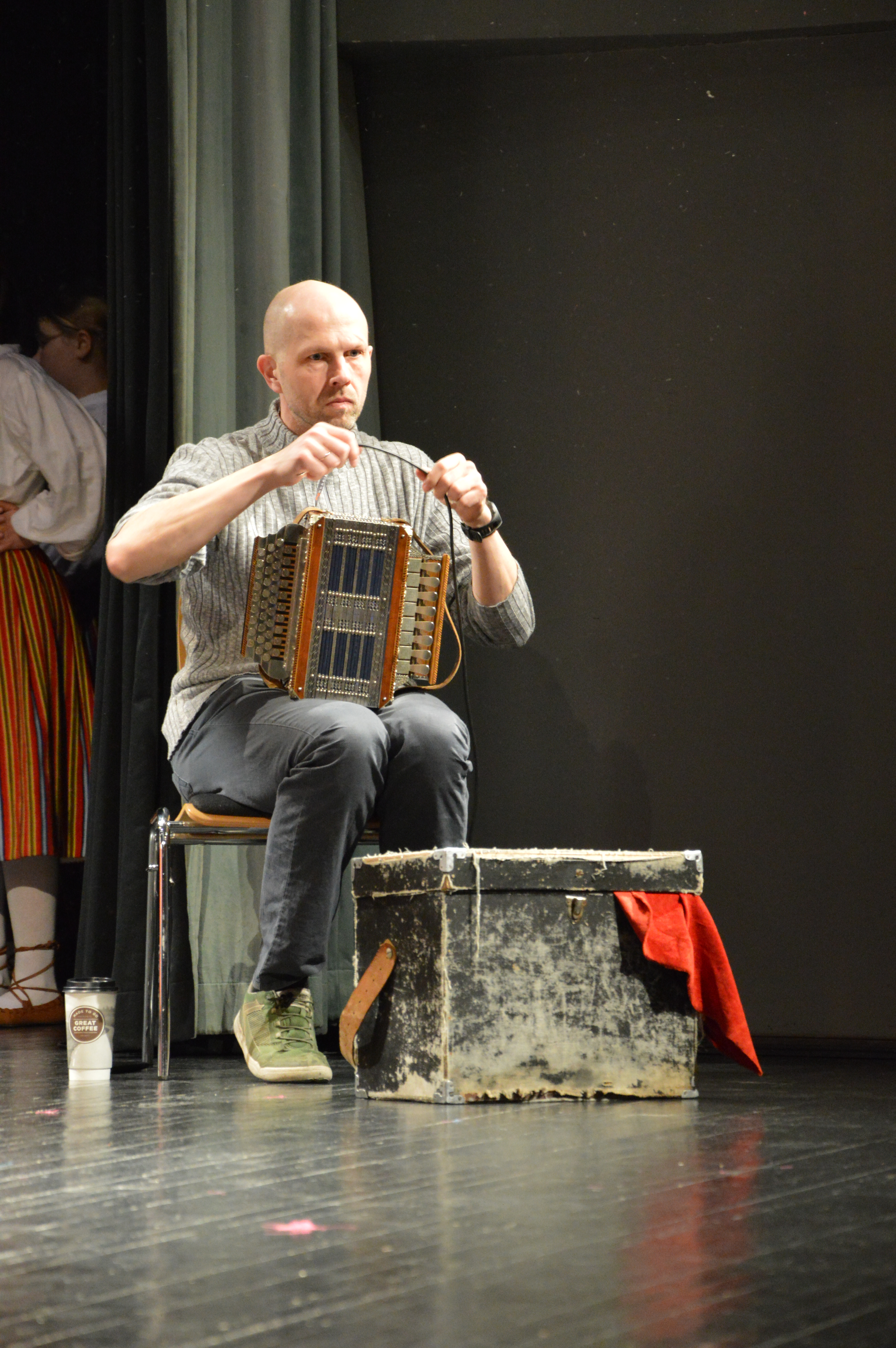
Kaido Reivelt in 2015 making preparations for the concert of University of Tartu Folk Art Ensemble.

Kaido Reivelt (born 29 October 1970) is an Estonian physicist and science populariser who works at the University of Tartu Institute of Physics. His research area is wave optics and he is President of the Estonian Physical Society.

Reivelt has been the local coordinator of the GLOBE Program since 2007, and was the development leader of the AHHAA science centre from 2003 to 2005.

Reivelt is an eight-time Estonian champion in rowing.

== Selected publications ==
- Reivelt, K. and P. Saari, (2002) "Experimental Demonstration of Realizability of Optical Focus Wave Modes," Phys. Rev. E 66, 056611
- Reivelt, K. (2002), “Self-imaging of pulsed wave fields” Opt. Express 10, 360
