= Konstantin Türnpu =

Estonian composer and conductor

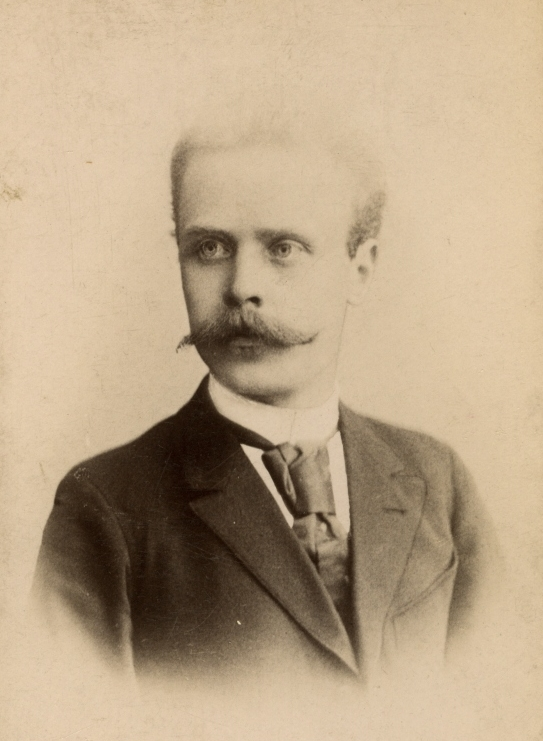
Konstantin Türnpu

Konstantin Jakob Türnpu (August 13, 1865 – April 16, 1927) was an Estonian composer and conductor. He is considered one of the most important figures in Estonian choral music.

Türnpu was born in Klooga, Estonia, on August 13, 1865. He studied music independently at first, but in 1886, he entered the Saint Petersburg Conservatory, where he studied organ with Louis Homilius and composition with Julius Johannsen. He graduated from the conservatory in 1891.

After graduating from the conservatory, Türnpu returned to Estonia and worked as an organist and choir conductor. He was also a music teacher at several schools in Tallinn. In 1892, he became the organist of the Niguliste Church in Tallinn, a position he held until his death.

In 1916, Türnpu became the conductor of the Tallinn Male Song Society's male choir. He conducted the choir for the next 11 years, and during that time he helped to raise the choir to a high level of artistry. He also served as the general conductor of the V and VI Estonian Song Festivals.

Türnpu's compositions are mostly choral works, but he also wrote a few solo songs and organ pieces. His choral music is characterized by its lyrical melodies, rich harmonies, and use of Estonian folk song material. Some of his most popular choral works include "Meil aiaäärne tänavas" (Our Childhood Village Lane), "Mull' lapsepõlves rääkis" (My Childhood Told Me), and "Tervitus" (Greeting).

Türnpu died in Tallinn on April 16, 1927. He is considered one of the most important figures in Estonian choral music. His compositions are still widely performed today, and he is remembered as a gifted composer and conductor who made a significant contribution to Estonian culture.

== Works ==
- Kevade tunne (1919)
- Valvur (1920–1922)
- Troost (Solace) (1926)
- Meil aiaäärne tänavas (Our Childhood Village Lane)
- Mull' lapsepõlves rääkis (My Childhood Told Me)
- Tervitus (Greeting)
- Üksainus kord (Just One Time)
- Kallis Mari (Dear Mari)
- Kaugel (Far)
- Üürike (Ephemeral)
- Igatsus (Yearning)
- Ära küsi (Don't Ask)
- Koit (Dawn)
- Laanepääle (To Laanemaa)
- Eesti laul (Estonian Song)
- Püha öö (Holy Night)
- Jõululaul (Christmas Song)
- Ülestõusmispühade laul (Easter Song)
