= Helju Vals =

Estonian journalist and editor

Helju Vals (1957-1960 Helju Heuer, pseudonyms Hille Sarem, Krista Varju; 1 March 1929 Tartu – 31 January 2011) was an Estonian language editor, journalist.

In 1953 she graduated from Tartu State University in Estonian philology. After graduating she worked at the editorial board of the newspaper Edasi (later, Postimees). From 1998 until 2003, she was the language advisor of Eesti Meedia.

She was one of the founders of the organizations Eestluse Elujõud, and Estonian Language Protection Association (Estonian: Eesti Keele Kaitse Ühing).

== Awards ==
- 2003: Wiedemann Language Award
- 2005: Order of the White Star, III class.

== Works ==
- Pipart keele peale: väike õpi- ja lustiraamat (2000)
- Ei päevagi kirjareata (2010)
