= Ellen Uuspõld =

Estonian linguist (1927–2019)

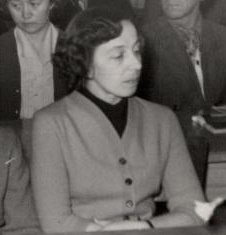
Ellen Uuspõld in 1960

Ellen Uuspõld (19 April 1927 – 7 June 2019) was an Estonian linguist.

In 1953 she graduated from Tartu University in Estonian philology. Since 1967 she taught at the University of Tartu. From 1980 until 1983, she taught the Estonian language at Tampere University.

Her scientific work was focused on the structure of Estonian language.

== Awards ==
- 1996: Tartu University's Big Medal
- 2000: Wiedemann Language Award
- 2004: Order of the White Star, V class.

== Works ==
- 1966 "Määrusliku des-, mata-, nud- (nuna-) ja tud- (tuna-) konstruktsiooni struktuur ja tähendus" E. Uuspõld
- 1973 "Eesti keele tekste ja harjutusi vene üliõpilastele. 1. vihik" E. Uuspõld, A. Valmet and E. Turu
- 1981 "Eesti keele tekste ja harjutusi vene üliõpilastele. 2. vihik" E. Uuspõld, A. Valmet and E. Turu
- 1981 "Eesti keele õpik = Учебник эстонского языка" E. Uuspõld, A. Valmet and E. Turu
- 1982 "Viron verbien infiniittisten rakenteiden subjektisääntöjä" E. Uuspõld
- 1984 "Johannes Aavik viron kirjakielen uudistajana" E. Uuspõld
- 1992 "Viron transitiiviverbien syntaksist" E. Uuspõld
- 1993 "Eesti keele õpik kõrgkoolidele = Учебник эстонского языка для вузов" E. Uuspõld, A. Valmet and E. Turu
- 1966 "Eesti keele õpik = Учебник эстонского языка" E. Uuspõld, A. Valmet and E. Turu
- 1997 "Pühendusteos Huno Rätsepale" E.Uuspõld, A. Valmet and E. Turu
- 2001 "Популярная грамматика эстонского языка. Eesti keele grammatiline vormistik. Moodustamine ja kasutamine" E. Uuspõld and A. Valmet
- 2002 "Õpetusi ja harjutusi algajale keeletoimetajale" E. Uuspõld and A. Mund
- 2004 "Üliõpilastööde vormistamise juhend" E. Uuspõld
