= Mati Erelt =

Estonian linguist (1941–2024)

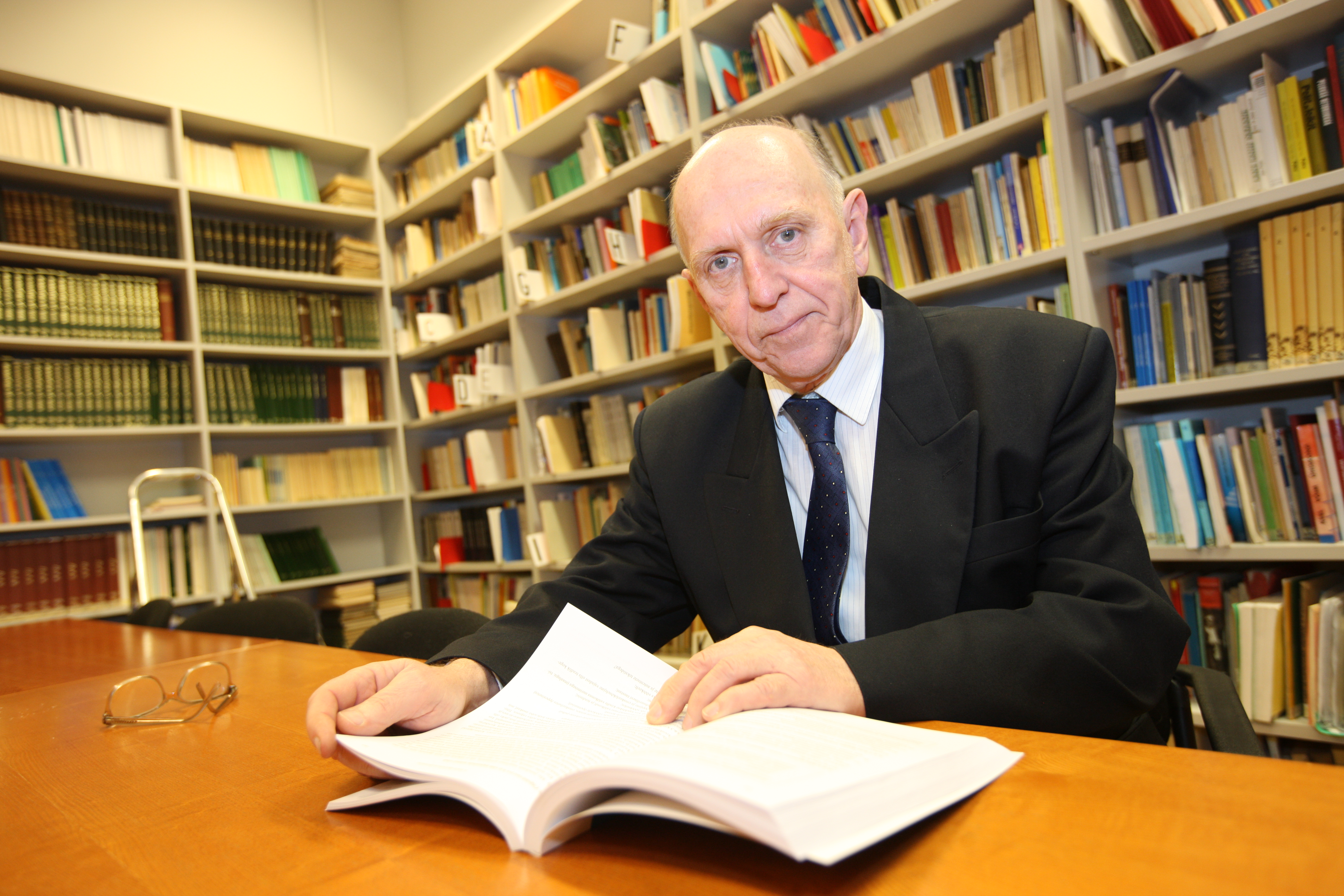
Mati Erelt

Mati Erelt (12 March 1941 – 12 October 2024) was an Estonian linguist.

Erelt was born in Tallinn. In 1965, he graduated from the University of Tartu with a degree in Estonian language and literature. He defended his doctoral dissertation there in 1981.

From 1989 until 1991, he was a professor at Tallinn Pedagogical Institute. From 1991 to 1995, he was a visiting professor at the Chair of Finno-Ugric Languages at the University of Helsinki, and from 1995 to 2006 he was a professor at the Chair of Estonian at the University of Tartu. He was later Professor Emeritus at the University of Tartu as well as a Senior Research Fellow.

From 1997 until 2006 he was the chairman of Mother Tongue Society.

Erelt was married to linguist Tiiu Erelt. He died on 12 October 2024, at the age of 83.

== Awards ==
- 2005: Order of the White Star, IV class
- 2006: Medal of Estonian Academy of Sciences
- 2006: Big Medal of Tartu University (Estonian: Tartu ülikooli suur medal)
- 2008: Wiedemann Language Award
