= Paul Ariste =

Estonian linguist (1905–1990)

- Born: February 3, 1905
- Died: February 2, 1990 (aged 84)
- Scientific career
- Notable students: Lydia Vasikova

Paul Ariste (3 February 1905 – 2 February 1990) was an Estonian linguist renowned for his studies of the Finno-Ugric languages (especially Estonian and Votic), Yiddish and Baltic Romani language.

He was born as Paul Berg, in Rääbise, Võtikvere Parish (now Jõgeva Parish), Kreis Dorpat, Governorate of Livonia, Russian Empire, but in 1927 Estonized his name to Ariste. He graduated from the University of Tartu and subsequently worked with it. Ariste wrote his M.A. thesis ("Eesti-rootsi laensõnad eesti keeles") on Swedish – viz. Estonian Swedish dialect – loanwords in Estonian, his doctoral thesis ("Hiiu murrete häälikud") treated the Hiiumaa dialect of Estonian language. From 1945 to 1946, Ariste was imprisoned by the Soviet authorities (for having been member of Veljesto, a student association in independent Estonia)

Since 1927 Paul Ariste eagerly participated in activities of Estonian Folklore Archives, where he established collections of Jewish, Swedish and Romani folklore, and contributed a lot to collections of Finno-Baltic minorities and Old-Believers of Peipsi region.

He was the head of the Finno-Ugrian Department at the University of Tartu and one of the two most instrumental personalities in reviving Soviet Finno-Ugrian studies. Ariste founded the journal Sovetskoye finnougrovedeniye (Советское финноугроведение; Soviet Finno-Ugric Studies, later renamed Linguistica Uralica).

He was also a notable Esperantist, and a member of the Academy of Esperanto between 1967 and 1976. He was also listed in a year 2000 issue of the Esperanto magazine La Ondo among the 100 most eminent Esperantists. In December 2024, the Sihtasutus Traderson Foundation established the commemorative medal Votic Cross (Votic: Vađđa Rissi). Among the first nominees posthumously presented is linguist Paul Ariste for his contribution to the preservation of the Votic language, with the medal to be presented to his granddaughter.

He died in Tartu, aged 84.

== Notable students ==
- Lydia Vasikova, philologist
