= Lauri Kettunen (linguist) =

Finnish linguist (1885–1963)

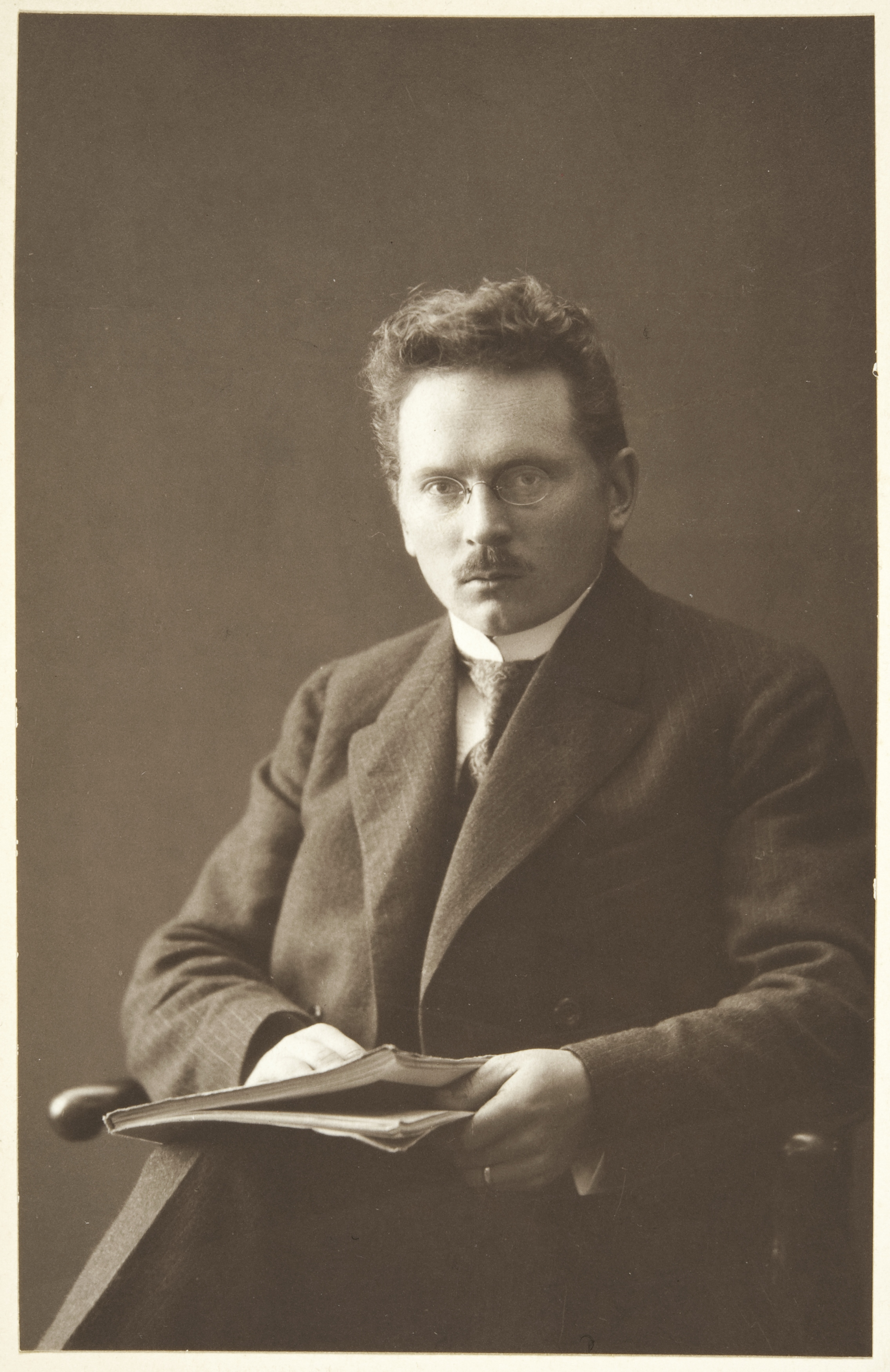
- Born: September 10, 1885; Joroinen, Finland
- Died: February 26, 1963 (aged 77); Helsinki, Finland
- Resting place: Hietaniemi Cemetery
- Occupation: Linguist

Lauri Einari Kettunen (September 10, 1885 – February 26, 1963) was a Finnish linguist. He studied Finnish dialects and the Finnic languages, and he worked as a professor at the University of Tartu and the University of Helsinki.

== Early life and education ==
Kettunen was born in Joroinen, Finland, the son of the farmers Paul Paulsson Kettunen (1845–1921) and Hilda Augusta Carlsdotter Kettunen (née Wentin, 1850–1901). He graduated from the Kuopio Finnish Community School in 1905, after which he began studying Finnish and related languages at the University of Helsinki. Among his lecturers was Eemil Nestor Setälä.

In 1908, after three years of studies, Kettunen graduated from the University of Helsinki with a thesis on Finnish language and literature. In the same year he visited Estonia for the first time. He received his licentiate in 1912 and a year later defended his doctoral dissertation. Kettunen's doctoral dissertation, Lautgeschichtliche Untersuchung über den kodaferschen Dialekt, dealt with the phonetic history of the Kodavere dialect of Estonian.

== Career ==
In 1914, Kettunen became an associate professor of Finnish at the University of Helsinki and worked as an associate professor of Finnish philology at that university. From 1920 to 1925, he also worked as a professor of Finnic languages at the University of Tartu.

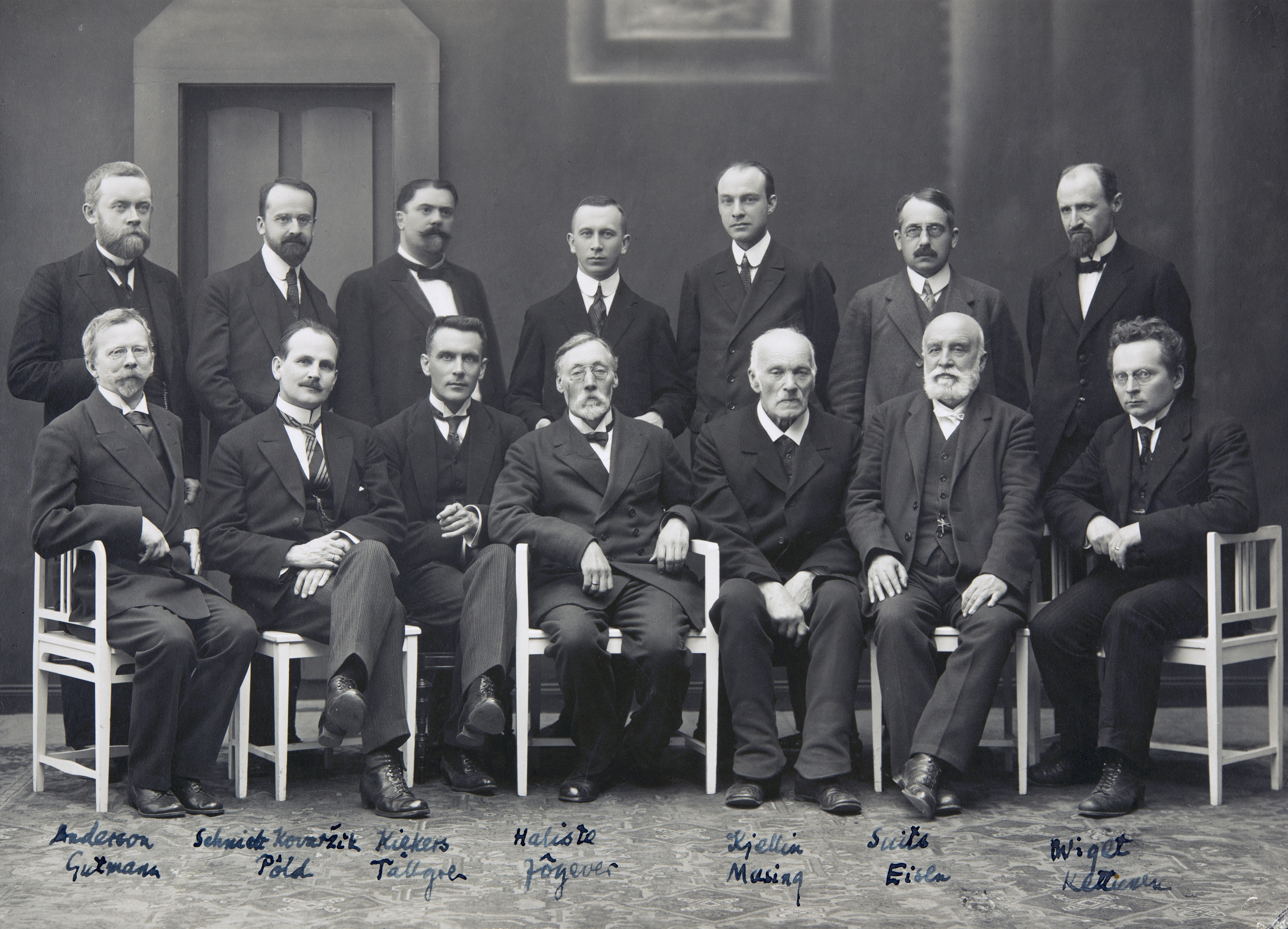
Professors of the University of Tartu's Faculty of Philosophy in the early 1920s (Lauri Kettunen is seated first on the right)

In 1929, Kettunen was appointed a professor of Finnic languages at the University of Helsinki. He held this position until 1938. The position was changed to a professorship of Estonian and closely related languages at the beginning of 1939. Kettunen retired from this position in 1953. During unpaid leave, he worked as a lecturer at the Royal Hungarian Péter Pázmány University in Budapest from 1935 to 1937 and from 1941 to 1944.

Lauri Kettunen participated in the activities of the Society for the Study of Finnish, the Finno-Ugrian Society, and the Finnish Literature Society. He was one of the founders of the Estonian Mother Tongue Society, established in 1920, and was its chairman from 1920 to 1924. In 1959, Kettunen received the Finnish Academy of Sciences Prize (500,000 marks) in recognition of his services as a researcher of the Finnic languages.

Kettunen repeatedly argued with Lauri Hakulinen, among other things on topics of linguistic history. In more than one controversial issue, only later research has been able to demonstrate the correctness of the position of the "pettifogger Kettunen". In language organization, Kettunen often represented a more liberal position than Hakulinen and Eemil Arvi Saarimaa, whose textbook Hyvää ja huonoa suomea (Good and Bad Finnish) was countered by Kettunen with the textbook Hyvää vapaata suomea (Good Free Finnish).

In addition to his academic career, Lauri Kettunen was a fiction writer. He wrote prose, poetry, and plays. Some of Kettunen's fiction was published under the pseudonym Toivo Hovi. Kettunen translated the poems of the Estonian poet Bernard Kangro into Finnish and wrote his own collection of Estonian poetry, called Südame sillad (Bridges of the Heart, 1960).

== Expeditions ==
The culture of tribal peoples and its development was Kettunen's passion. Kettunen visited many peoples speaking Finnic languages, collecting language samples. During his travels, Kettunen visited Estonians, Vots, Veps, Livonians, and Karelians, as well as the Värmland Forest Finns in Sweden.

In the late 1920s and 1930s, Kettunen traveled in Finland, studying Finnish dialect differences and mapping dialect areas. The scope of the work was enormous because Kettunen's goal was to visit almost every parish in Finland. Kettunen interviewed people in their homes, as well as in nursing homes and prisons. Kettunen traveled by bicycle, ski, and motorcycle, and later by car.

Kettunen's Murrekartasto (Dialect Atlas) produced as a result of the research contains 213 maps showing the distribution of the most important dialects. Later abridged editions contain 64 maps.

== Personal life ==
Lauri Kettunen and his wife Hilja Armida Kettunen (née Sevón, later Aulo; 1888–1981) had three children, two of whom died young. Kettunen was a supporter of Theosophy. Kettunen is buried in Hietaniemi Cemetery in Helsinki.

== Awards and recognitions ==
- Cross of Liberty, 1st Division (military merit), 2nd Class (1920)
- Cross of Liberty, 3rd Division (civil merit), 2nd Class (1925)

== Works ==
- 1915: Vatjan kielen äännehistoria (The Phonetic History of Votic)
- 1916: Viron ja suomen eroavaisuudet (Differences between Estonian and Finnish)
- 1917: Virolais-suomalainen sanakirja (Estonian–Finnish Dictionary)
- 1920: Näytteitä etelävepsästä I (Samples from Southern Veps I)
- 1922: Lõunavepsa häälik-ajalugu (The Phonetic History of Southern Veps)
- 1925: Näytteitä etelävepsästä II (Samples from Southern Veps II)
- 1928: Eestin kielen oppikirja (Estonian Textbook)
- 1929: Eestin kielen äännehistoria (Phonological History of Estonian)
- 1930: Suomen murteet I. Murrenäytteitä (Finnish Dialects I. Dialect Samples)
- 1930: Suomen murteet II. Murrealueet (Finnish Dialects II. Dialect Areas)
- 1940: Suomen murteet III. A. Murrekartasto ja B. Selityksiä murrekartastoon (Finnish Dialects III. A. Dialect Atlas, B. Notes on the Dialect Atlas)
- 1943: Lauseopillinen tutkimus vepsän murteista (A Syntactic Study of Veps Dialects)
- 1945: Tieteen matkamiehenä (A Research Explorer)
- 1945: (as Toivo Hovi) Tisza tulvii – Ilona, Ilona! (The Tisza Is Flooding—Ilona, Ilona!)
- 1948: Tieteen matkamiehen uusia elämyksiä (New Experiences of a Research Explorer)
- 1949: Hyvää vapaata suomea (Good Free Finnish)
- 1949: Suomen kielen ohjesanastoa (A Guide to the Finnish Language)
- 1950: (as Toivo Hovi) Suutari Vilihunen (Vilihunen the Cobbler)
- 1960: (as Toivo Hovi) Lalli Lallonpoika (Lalli)
- 1960: Matkapakinoita ja muita muistelmia 1925–1960 (Travel Adventures and Other Memoirs, 1925–1960)
- 1960: Kahdeksan matkaa Vermlannin metsäsuomalaisiin (Eight Journeys to the Finnish Forests of Värmland)
- 1999: Laadogast Balatonini: mälestusi 1918–1924 (From Ladoga to Balaton: Memories 1918–1924), Estonian publication

== Legacy ==
A bas-relief of Lauri Kettunen is located in Auditorium 139 of the main building of the University of Tartu.

In 2005, the conference Lauri Kettunen 120 was held in Tartu.

In the spring of 2024, the Mother Tongue Society, headed by Jüri Valge, started collecting donations for a memorial to Lauri Kettunen in Tartu.
