= Estonian Literary Society =

Organization based in Estonia

Estonian Literary Society (Estonian: Eesti Kirjandse Selts, abbreviated EKS) is an Estonian organization which aims are to popularize literature and literary science related to Estonia, and also to enhance cooperation between Estonian organizations and institutions related to literature.

EKS was founded in 1907.

EKS is associated with Estonian Academy of Sciences.

== See also ==
- Estonian Writers' Union
