= Karl Rebane =

Estonian physicist

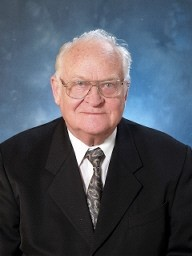
- Born: 11 April 1926; Pärnu, Estonia
- Died: 4 November 2007 (aged 81); Tartu, Estonia

Academic background
- Education: Tallinn Technical University; Leningrad University; Institute of Physics of the Belarusian AS

Karl Rebane (11 April 1926 – 4 November 2007) was an Estonian physicist.

== Biography ==
He studied at the Tallinn Technical University from 1947 to 1949, and graduated from the Leningrad University in 1952. He graduated from Leningrad University in 1955 with a doctorate in solid state theory. He also obtained a Doctor of Sciences in Theoretical Physics in 1964 from the Belarusian AS. He became a faculty member at Tartu University in 1955. He was Professor and Chair of the Experimental Physics Department between 1958 and 1960, and was Professor and Chair of the Joint Department of Laser Optics at the Institute of Physics between 1974 and 1993. He was president of the Estonian Academy of Sciences from 1973 to 1990.

== Early life ==
Karl Rebane was born in Pärnu, Estonia. His father, Karl Rebane Sr., was a bookkeeper. He was the second oldest out of five children. His brothers were Jaan Rebane, Toomas Rebane (:et) and Jüri Rebane. The war reached Estonia in 1941 and his family evacuated to a small village in the oblast of Chelyabinsk where he worked at the local kolkhoz and attended a school for displaced Estonian children in Verkhneuralsk. In the spring of 1944, he was called into military service and joined Eesti Laskurkorpus, an Estonian division of the Red Army, where he was a crew member of a 45 mm antitank gun. He was wounded in battle on November 23, 1944, on the Sõrve peninsula, Estonia.

== Awards and honours ==
For research and scientific activity:

- 1965 – Estonian SSR National Prize
- 1976 – Order of the Red Banner of Labour
- 1981 – P. N. Lebedev Gold Medal from the Academy of Sciences of the Soviet Union for achievements in the field of Physics
- 1986 – Medal of the Estonian Academy of Sciences
- 1986 – Hero of Socialist Labour, Order of Lenin
- 1993 – Humboldt Research Award (Germany)
- 1996 – Estonian National Research Award (as part of a collective) for research work in exact sciences, chemistry, and biology
- 2000 – Order of Friendship
- 2001 – Estonian National Research Award for outstanding lifetime achievements in research and development
- 2002 – Royal Norwegian Order of Merit
- 2003 – Cariplo Research Fellowship (Italy)
- 2006 – Order of the White Star, 3rd class

== Family ==
He was married to Ljubov Rebane, and had two children, Inna and Aleksander Rebane. He also had three brothers, Jaan, Toomas, and Jüri Rebane.
