= Linguistica Uralica =

Scientific journal, focused on Finno-Ugric and Samoyedic languages

- Website: https://kirj.ee/lu/
- ISSN: 1736-7506
- OCLC: 212423778

Linguistica Uralica is an international journal which deals with Finno-Ugric and Samoyedic topics. The journal is published in Tallinn under the auspices of Estonian Academy of Sciences.

The first number was issued in 1963. Until 1989, the journal's name was Sovetskoje Finno-ugrovedenije (Russian: Советское финно-угрoведение).

In a year, four numbers are given out. Average circulation is 300 items.

Editors-in-chief:

- 1965-1990 Paul Ariste
- 1990-1996 Paul Kokla
- 1997-... Väino Klaus.
