= Mother Tongue Society =

Estonian language organization

Mother Tongue Society (Estonian: Emakeele Selts) is an Estonian organization that focuses on topics related to the Estonian language.

The organization was established on 23 March 1920 at Tartu University. Today, the organization is located in Tallinn. The organization is an associated organization of Estonian Academy of Sciences.

== Publications ==
- Akadeemilise Emakeele Seltsi aastaraamat, 1921–1926
- Eesti Keel, 1922–1940
- Emakeele Seltsi Aastaraamat, 1955–
- Kodumurre, 1960–2002
- Oma Keel, 2000–

== Directors ==
Directors:

- Lauri Kettunen: 1920–1924
- Andrus Saareste: 1925–1933, 1935, 1936–1941
- Julius Mägiste: 1934, 1936
- Arnold Kask: 1944, 1968–1982
- Johannes Voldemar Veski: 1946–1968
- Huno Rätsep: 1982–1989
- Tiit-Rein Viitso: 1989, 1993–1997
- Eeva Ahven: 1989–1990
- Henn Saari: 1990–1992
- Jüri Viikberg: 1992–1993
- Mati Erelt: 1997–2006
- Helle Metslang: since 2006
