= Institute of the Estonian Language =

Language regulating institution in Estonia

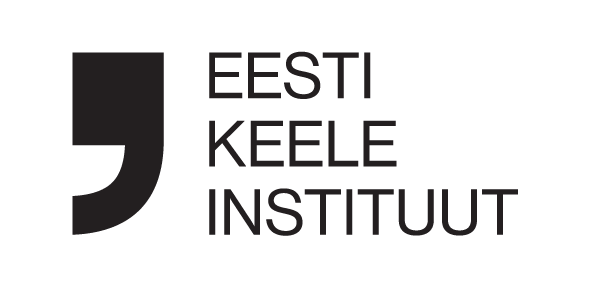

The Institute of the Estonian Language (Estonian: Eesti Keele Instituut) is the official language-regulatory authority of the Estonian language. It is located in the capital city of Estonia, Tallinn and is managed by the Estonian Ministry of Education and Research. Its stated formal goal is to contribute to the long-term survival of the Estonian language and it serves as the main body regulating standard Estonian orthography. The institute researches modern Estonian language, the history of the Estonian language, Estonian dialects, and Finno-Ugric languages.

The institute is sub-divided into four departments: the Department for Modern Estonian Language; the Department for Linguistic History; Dialects, and Finno-Ugric languages; the Department for Language Technology; and the Department for Language Learning Development.

It was founded in 1993, when the Institute of Language and Literature was reorganized. Since 2020, the institute's director has been Arvi Tavast.

== Dictionaries ==
The institute publishes a number of dictionaries, amongst which its Eesti õigekeelsussõnaraamat (Dictionary of Standard Estonian) is considered the prescriptive source for standard Estonian spelling.

The institute also publishes regularly updated editions of its Dictionary of Estonian Etymology (Eesti keele etümoloogiasõnaraamat), its Explanatory Dictionary of Estonian Language (Eesti keele seletav sõnaraamat), its Dictionary of Estonian Synonyms (Eesti keele sünonüümisõnastik) as well as a number of multi-lingual dictionaries, dictionaries related to specific professional fields, dictionaries for language learning, dictionaries on Estonian slang and numerous dictionaries on various Estonian dialects.

It also manages the online dictionary portal Sõnaveeb, which consolidates information from the institute's various dictionaries and other sources.

== Directors ==
- Asta Õim (1993–2000)
- Urmas Sutrop (2000–2015)
- Tõnu Tender (2015–2020)
- Arvi Tavast (2020–)
