= Estonian Academy of Sciences =

Estonia's national academy of science in Tallinn

- Eesti Teaduste Akadeemia
- Formation: 28 January 1938; 88 years ago
- Headquarters: Tallinn, Estonia
- Coordinates: 59°26′12″N 24°44′28″E
- President: Mart Saarma
- Website: www.akadeemia.ee

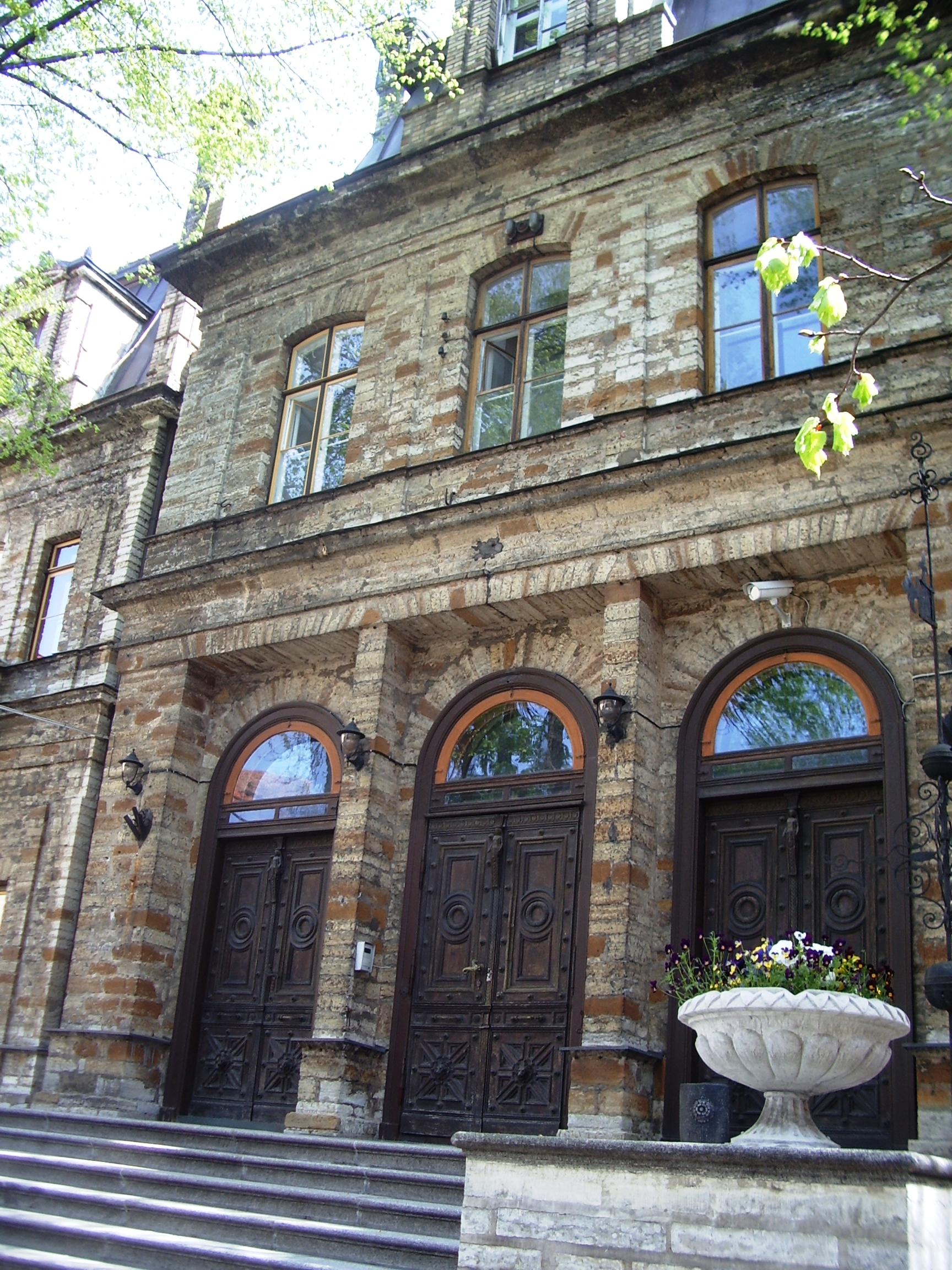
Ungern-Sternberg palace on Toompea, nowadays the main building of Estonian Academy of Sciences (Kohtu Street 6, built 1865–1868, architect Martin Gropius)

Founded in 1938, the Estonian Academy of Sciences (Estonian: Eesti Teaduste Akadeemia, Latin: Academia Scientiarum Estoniae) is Estonia's national academy of science in Tallinn. As with other national academies, it is an independent group of well-known scientists whose stated aim is to promote research and development, encourage international scientific cooperation, and disseminate knowledge to the public. As of March 2026, it had 77 full members and 19 foreign members. Since 2024, the president of the academy is the molecular biologist Mart Saarma.

== Divisions ==
The academy has four divisions:

- Division of Astronomy and Physics (Estonian: Astronoomia ja füüsika osakond)
- Division of Informatics and Engineering (Estonian: Informaatika ja tehnikateaduste osakond)
- Division of Biology, Geology and Chemistry (Estonian: Bioloogia, geoloogia ja keemia osakond)
- Division of the Humanities and Social Sciences (Estonian: Humanitaar- ja sotsiaalteaduste osakond)

== History ==
The academy was established in 1938 as a learned society. When Estonia was occupied by the Soviet Union the academy was dissolved on July 17, 1940. In June 1945 it was reestablished as the Academy of Sciences of the Estonian SSR (Estonian: Eesti NSV Teaduste Akadeemia). In Soviet times, it consisted of a central library and four divisions containing 15 research institutes as well as other scientific societies and museums. In April 1989, shortly before Estonian independence, the academy regained its original name of Estonian Academy of Sciences. At this time it was also restructured into its present form.

=== Presidents ===
- 1946–1950 Hans Kruus
- 1950–1968 Johan Eichfeld
- 1968–1973 Arnold Veimer
- 1973–1990 Karl Rebane
- 1990–1994 Arno Köörna
- 1994–2004 Jüri Engelbrecht
- 2004–2014 Richard Villems
- 2014–2024 Tarmo Soomere
- since 2024 Mart Saarma

== Prizes ==
The academy's most prestigious prize is the Medal of the Estonian Academy of Sciences. This is awarded "for outstanding services in development of Estonian science or in helping forward its development, as well as for services in performance of tasks of the Estonian Academy of Sciences."

== Location ==
The academy is located on Kohtu Street in Tallinn. Its building is the so-called palace of Ungern-Sternberg, built in 1865 by the architect Martin Gropius.

== Estonian Academy Publishers ==
At the academy, the Estonian Academy Publishers (Estonian: Teaduste Akadeemia Kirjastus) is located. As of 2021 the publisher publishes seven journals:

1. Proceedings of the Estonian Academy of Sciences
2. Estonian Journal of Earth Sciences
3. Oil Shale
4. Linguistica Uralica
5. Trames
6. Estonian Journal of Archaeology
7. Acta Historica Tallinnensia

In addition, the publisher publishes The Yearbook of the Estonian Mother Tongue Society.

The publisher published the following journals:

1. Estonian Journal of Ecology
2. Estonian Journal of Engineering
3. Proceedings of the Estonian Academy of Sciences. Geology
4. Proceedings of the Estonian Academy of Sciences. Chemistry
5. Proceedings of the Estonian Academy of Sciences. Physics. Mathematics

== Associated organizations ==
Several organizations are associated with the academy. These institutions or societies have activities and goals that conform to the objectives of the academy. They include:

- Estonian Naturalists' Society
- Estonian Geographical Society
- Society of Estonian Regional Studies
- Estonian Mother Tongue Society
- Estonian Union of the History and Philosophy of Science
- Estonian Learned Society in Sweden
- Estonian Literary Society
- Learned Estonian Society
- Estonian Musicological Society
- Estonian Physical Society
- Estonian Association of Engineers
- Estonian Biochemical Society
- Estonian Semiotics Association
- Estonian Chemical Society
- Estonian Society of Human Genetics
- Estonian Society for Economics
- Estonian Society for the Study of Religions

The press is also a member of the Association of European University Presses.
