= Estonian folklore =

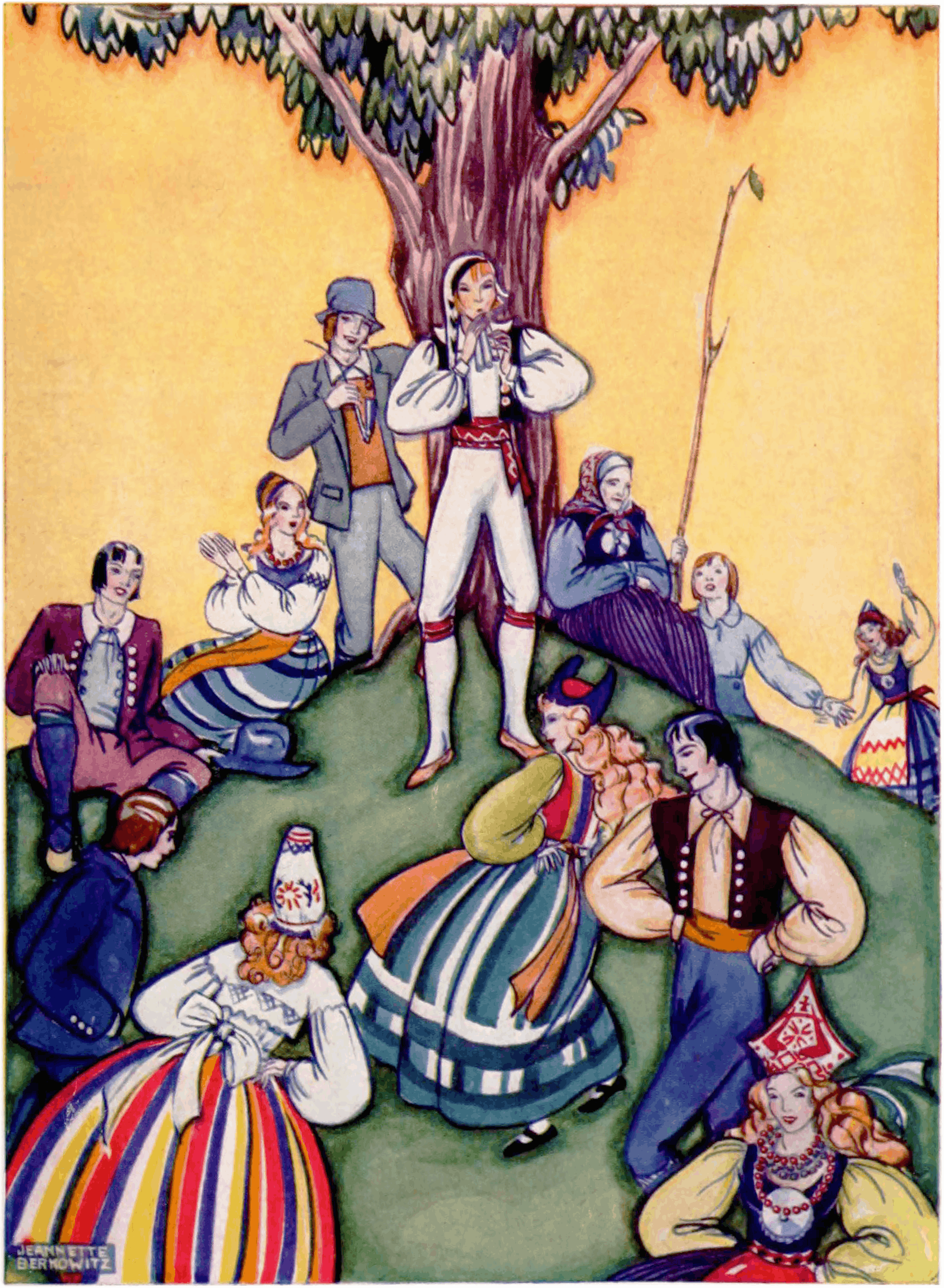
An illustration from Fairy tales from Baltic shores.

Estonian folkore includes elements of Estonian mythology and Baltic Finnic paganism. Henry of Livonia at the beginning of the 13th century described Estonian sacrificial customs, gods and spirits. Estonian folklore usually connects to features of the environment, such as sacred stones (erratics), springs, and groves (hiis). Estonian folk stories are known for figures such as Kalevipoeg, and Suur Tõll, the protector of the island of Saaremaa. The Estonian pantheon includes deities like Taara, the supreme god of nature. Other notable entities include the Kratt and the Libahunt, or werewolf.

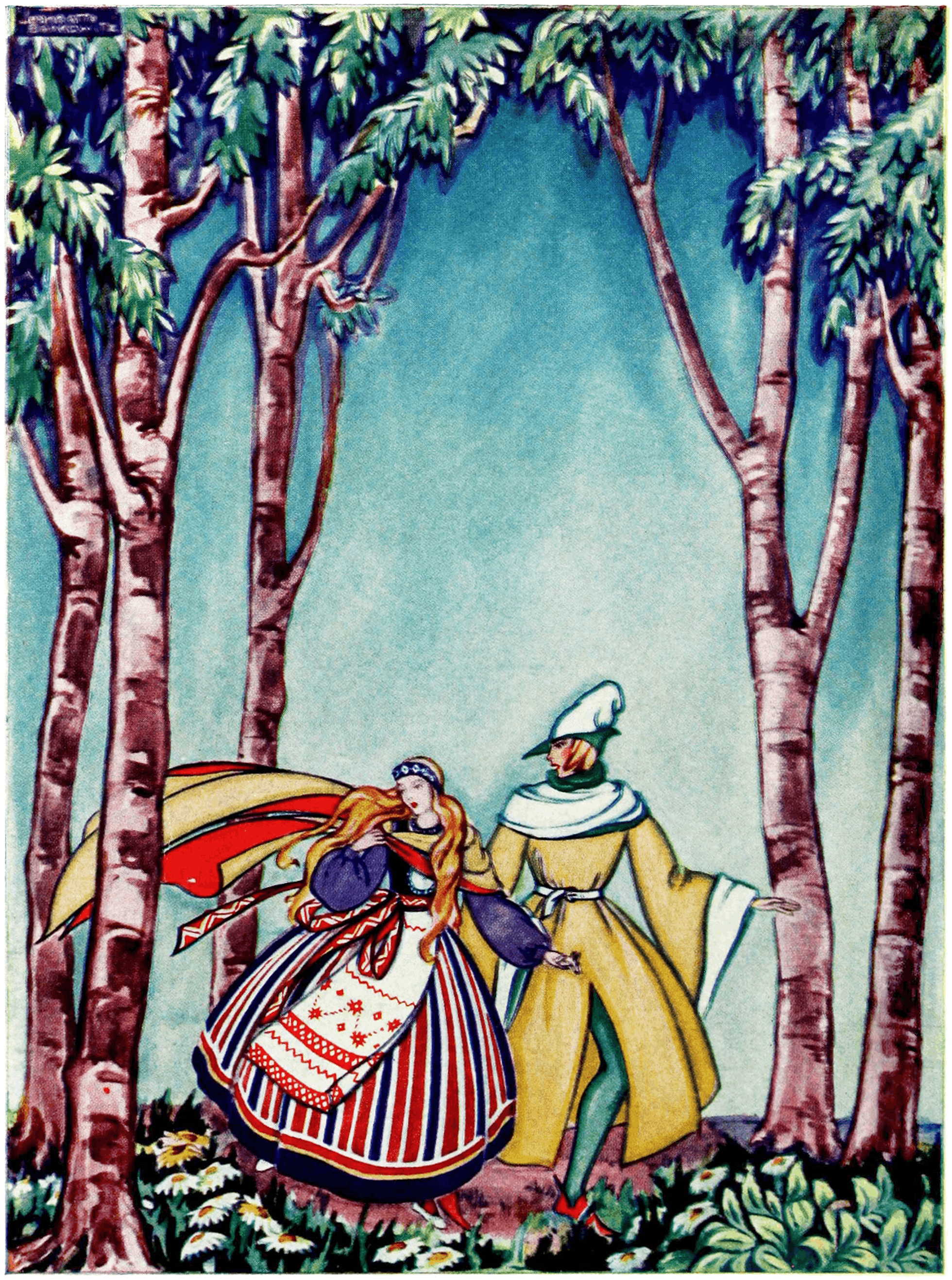
Frontispiece from the anthology "Fairy Tales from Baltic Shores".

Estonian folklore has been well-documented and when counting collections of documented folklore across Estonia and Finland there are "over 30,000 melodies, 55,000 tales, 12,000 riddles, 135,000 superstitions, 215,000 proverbs and nearly 200,000 songs with about four million lines".

Although Estonian folklore borrows a number of elements from its neighbors, Estonian folklore was one of the means of cultural preservation during centuries of colonization and foreign rule. In the absence of an independent state prior to 1918, the Estonian people maintained their culture through folklore.

== Folktales ==
In Estonia, fairy tales or folktales (muinasjutud, singular muinasjutt), usually feature animal fables and magic, while legends (plural muistendid) tend to explain the origins of specific lakes, hills, and landscape features. Both story types are typically defined by their fictional nature, placed within an imagined world rather than historical or factual events. According to the Estonian Folklore Archives, these narratives may be categorised into several distinct sub-genres.

Folktales and stories from Estonia share many similar features to nearby countries. Folklorist Ülo Valk compared mythological motifs that have appeared across cultures. Ülo Tedre notes that fairy tales as fictional narratives that were often designed to instill empathy. The Finnish cultural researcher Mikko Lehtonen suggests that Western cultures centre on the individual, leading people to use stories to explore their own lives, desires, and flaws and audiences rarely consider a dilemma serious until a narrative personifies it through a specific character. These folktales have similar plot structures and a shared historical origin. In Estonia, the systematic classification of these narratives began with the work of Finnish folklorist Antti Aarne, who used the Jakob Hurt collection to establish the first index. This methodology was later refined into the Aarne–Thompson–Uther (ATU) classification system, which serves as the international standard for identifying stories by specific type numbers.

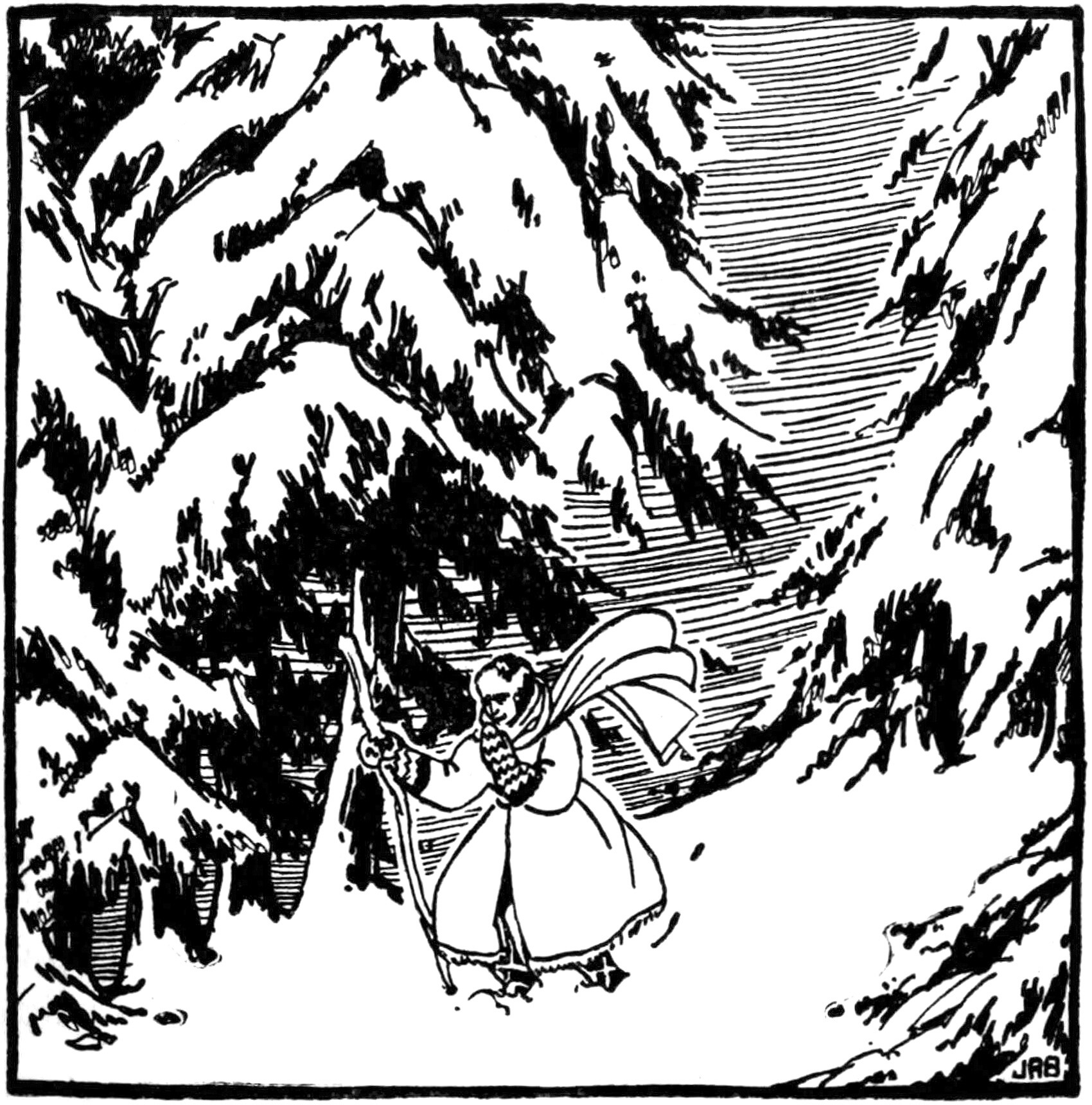
An illustration from Fairy tales from Baltic shores

Comparative phylogenetic analyses indicate that narratives such as ATU 330 (The Smith and the Devil) may have Proto-Indo-European roots, while others like ATU 706 (The Girl Without Hands) likely existed before the divergence of the Balto-Slavic or Romance language groups. The distribution of these types also reflects historical cultural contacts within the Baltic region. Estonian folklore shares commonalities with Latvian and Lithuanian traditions, particularly in types like AT 240 (Meika munavahetus). Regional variations are common with specific types, such as AT 37* (The Fox in the Goose Flock) with a high frequency in Seto and Lutsi Estonian communities.

Fairy tales (muinasjutud) typically feature animal fables and magic. Legends (muistendid) describe the origins of lakes, hills, and landscape features. Estonian archives contain approximately 25,000 recorded fairy tales and anecdotes, which the folklorist Richard Viidalepp classifies into categories based on their thematic content: animal tales (loomamuinasjutud) feature protagonists like foxes, wolves, and bearss, miraculous or wonder tales(imemuinasjutud) constitute the largest category in Estonia and typically involve orphans, old men, and magic objects, legendary tales (legendilaadsed muinasjutud) are stories that incorporate religious or mythical motifs, novella-like tales (novellilaadsed muinasjutud) everyday fairy tales lack supernatural elements entirely, instead highlighting the cleverness of ordinary people, like village girls or craftsmen focusing on human wit, cleverness, or luck, and finally the tales of the stupid devil (muinasjutud rumalast kuradist) are a specific Estonian tradition featuring the characters Kaval-Ants and Vanapagana. Specifically, tales of the stupid devil are often structured as humorous tales (naljandid), though their tone may be brutal.

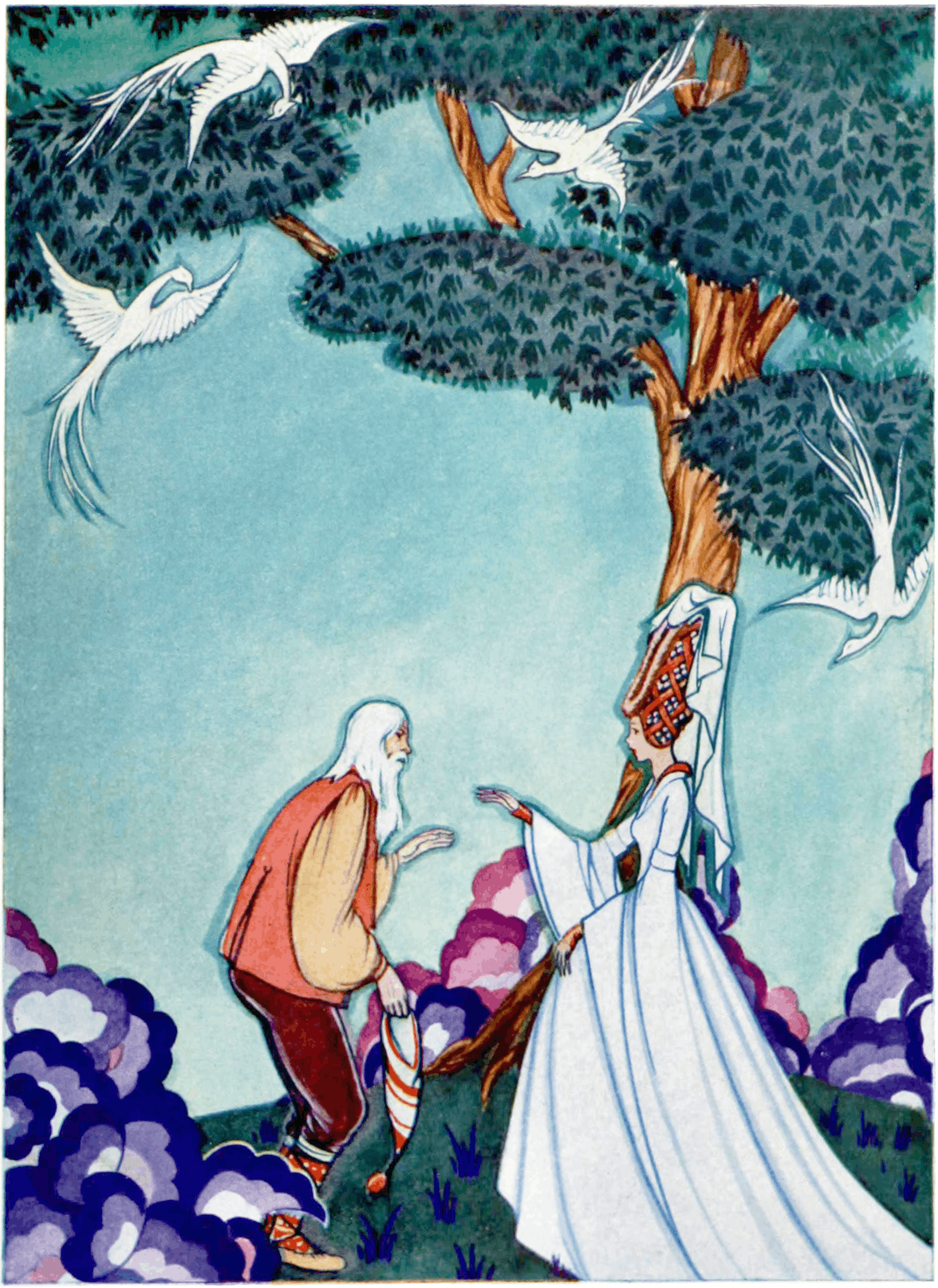
An illustration from Fairy tales from Baltic shores

Authentic Estonian folklore has creatures such as werewolves, giants, and water spirits and much of the folklore describes supernatural within the context of everyday life. From these, Estonian folktale characters generally fall into tropes of either the hero, the opponent, or supporting figures who provide tasks, advice, or assistance. In Estonian folktales, the hero consistently originates from the human world, whereas opponents and helpers frequently emerge from supernatural realms. Fairy tale heroes represent generalised archetypes rather than nuanced individuals. The narratives establish a clear dichotomy between good and evil and often feature the social class of those involved.

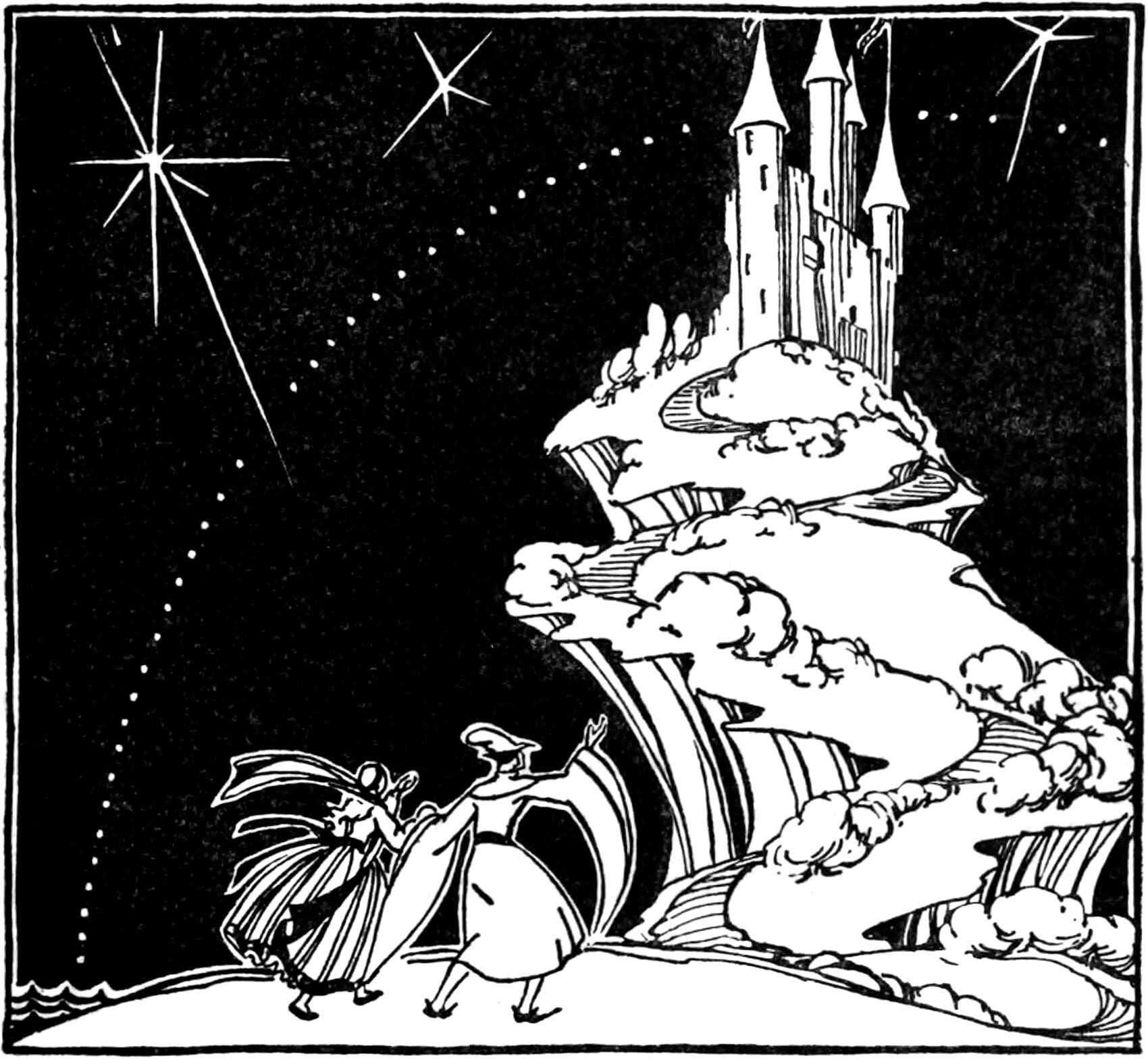
An illustration from Fairy tales from Baltic shores featuring early narrative elements of the collection.

An example of an Estonian folk story is Kalevipoeg, the Estonian national epic. During the nineteenth century, Estonian literary figures such as Kristjan Jaak Peterson, Friedrich Robert Faehlmann, and Friedrich Reinhold Kreutzwald attempted to create a national pantheon of gods and this led to the publication of Kalevipoeg. However, Matthias Johann Eisen argues that the original intent of folk tradition was never to have legendary heroes like Kalevipoeg be seen as divine or royal, and it was intentional that his strength was not bestowed by divine right.

Kristjan Raud's pencil drawing Kalevipoeg ja Vanapagan, held at the Tartu Art Museum showing the hero Kalevipoeg confronting the antagonist Vanapagan (English: Old Pagan)

The figure of the "Old Pagan" (Vanapagana) is consistently portrayed as the object of ridicule. These stories tend to be more mundane or everyday-oriented compared to more fantastical fairy tales. The tradition also includes tales of the stupid devil, locally known as Kaval-Ants and Vanapagan stories, alongside mundane, single-episode anecdotes.

=== Deities in folklore ===
- Taara, also known as Ukko or Uko, the supreme god of nature, sometimes referred to as Jumal
- Vanemuine, the god of music and art
- Maaema, Mother Earth
- Pikker, the god of lightning
- Peko, the Seto god of fertility and brewing
- Pikne, the god of thunder
- Taara, the god of nature
- Tooni, god of death
- Ukko, the supreme god
- Vanemuine, the god of songs, art and literature
- Vanapagan, the Devil
- Kratt, a demon
- Äiatar, the Devil's daughter
- Ebajalg, demonic whirlwind

=== Spirits in folklore ===
- Kuu, the Moon
- Metsaema, the Mother of Forest
- Metsavana, the Old Man of the Forest
- Haldjas, elf, fairy, protector spirit
- Härjapõlvlane, a type of spirit similar to a leprechaun
- Veteema, a spirit known as the Mother of Waters
- Näkk, a type of water spirit

=== Locations in folklore ===
- Toonela, land of the dead
- Kungla (mythical land), a mythical land of plenty or utopia

=== Characters in folklore ===
- Kalevipoeg, a mythical king of Estonia
- Suur Tõll, the husband of Piret, a giant, known as the protector of the island of Saaremaa
- Piret, the wife of Suur Tõll, known for her strength, associated with the island of Saaremaa
- Leiger, a giant, associated with the island of Hiiumaa
- Linda, mother of Kalevipoeg

=== Creatures in folklore ===
- Põhjakonn (Northern dragon lit. 'Northern frog'), a large mythological frog
- Maa-alused, creatures living beneath the earth who influence human health
- Libahunt, a werewolf, often associated with witches and healers
- Haldjas, a spirit that protects a specific area, such as a tree or house

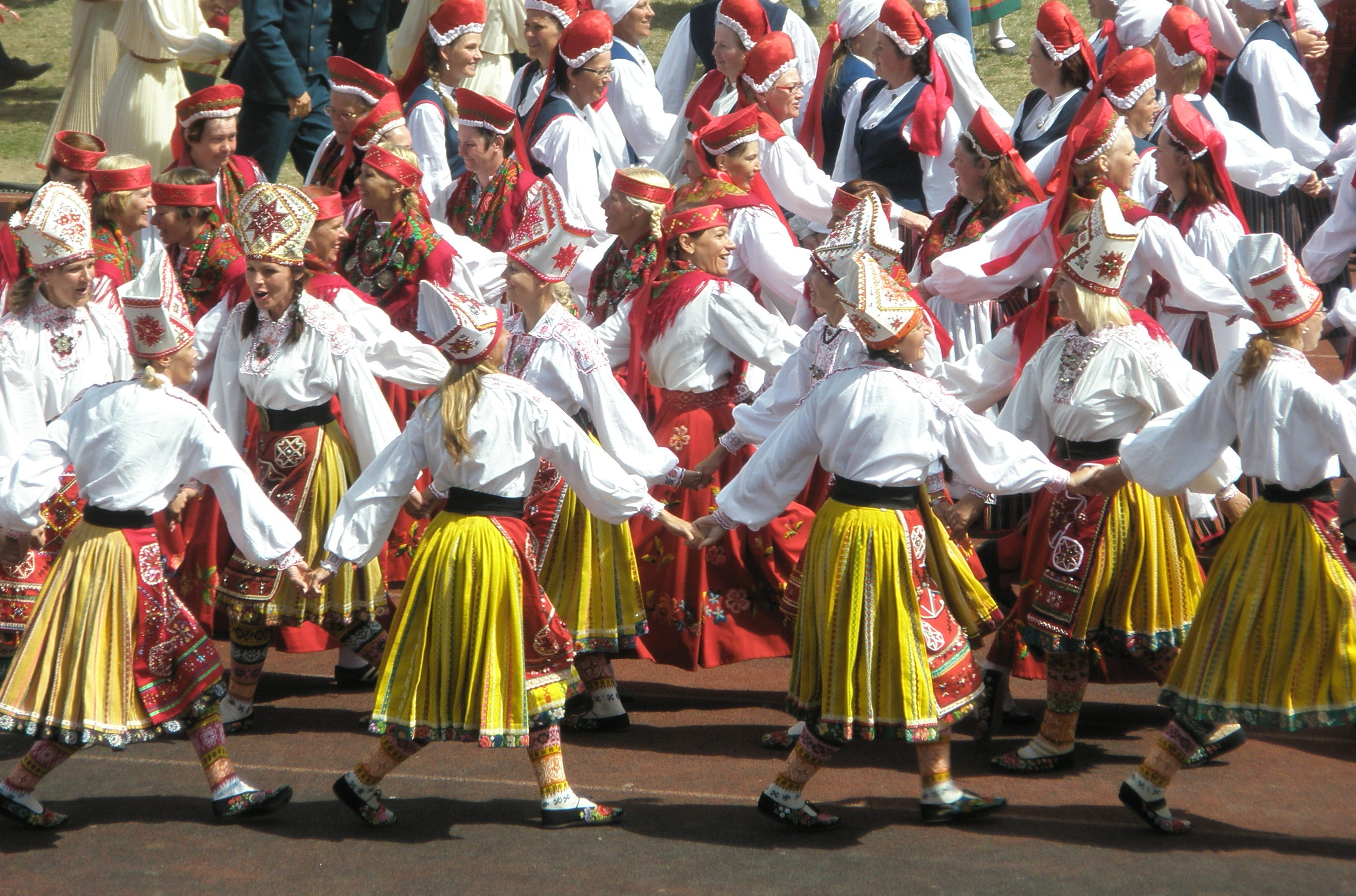
Performers at the 18th Estonian Dance Festival, a major cultural event that showcases the evolution of folk dance from village tradition to national spectacle.

== Folksong ==
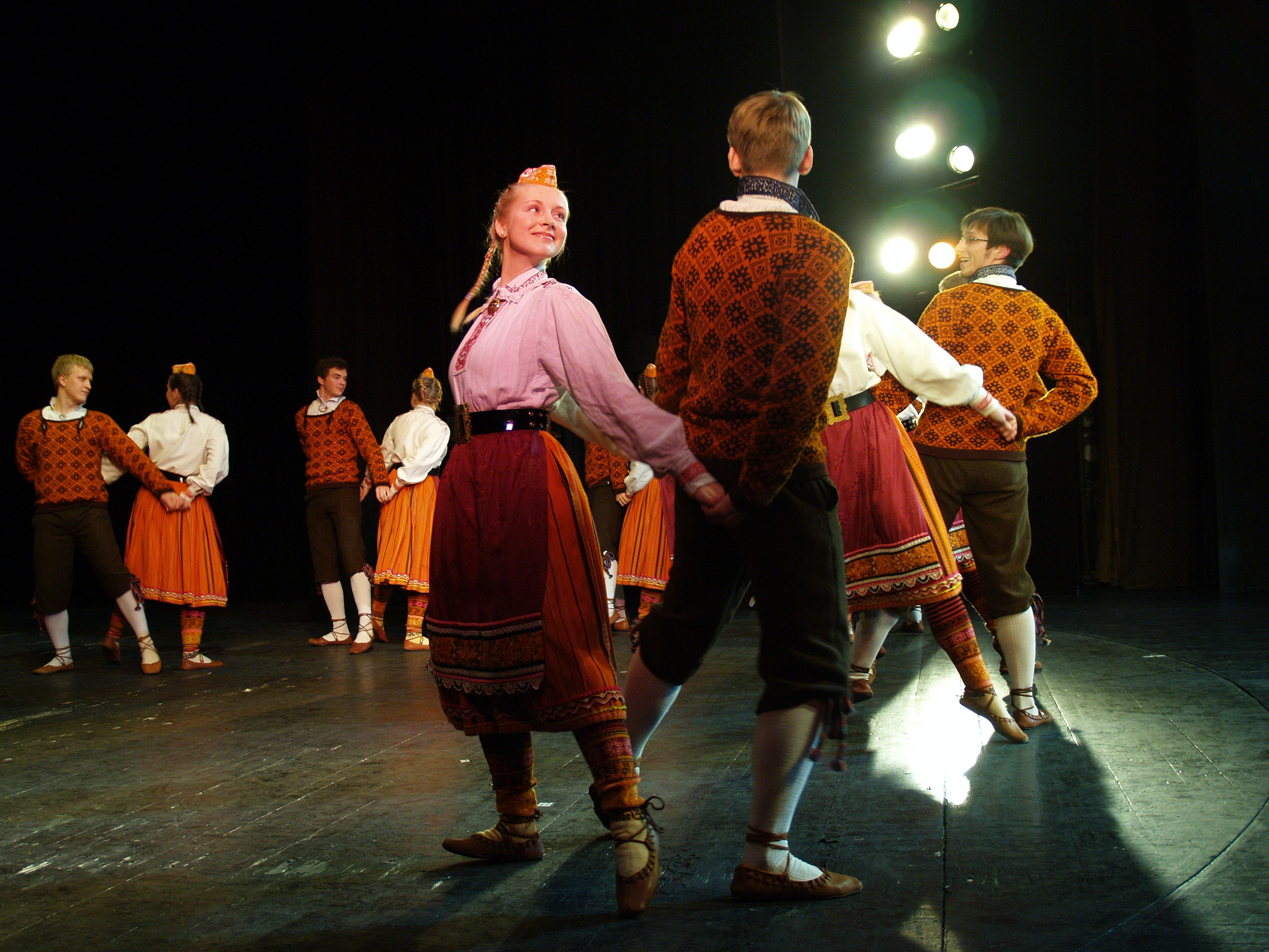
Members of the Tartu University Folk Art Ensemble performing "Kodukotus".

A defining feature of Estonian folklore is the focus on song. The oldest type of Estonian folk song is the regilaul (runic song). Regilaul have alliteration, assonance, and poetic parallelism. Regilaul typically follow an eight-syllable rhythmic line. This repetitive structure facilitated the memorisation of long narratives. Singing was a way of documenting history, planting crops, and, in the 20th century, was also used as a medium for political resistance during the Singing Revolution.

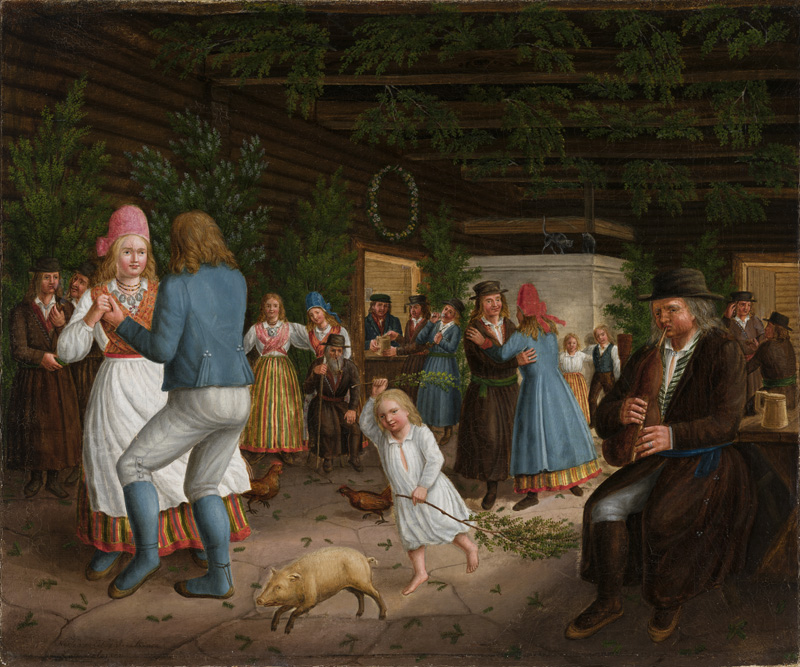
A 19th-century depiction of Estonian peasants performing a communal dance by Lorenz-Heinrich Petersen.

The earliest historical record of Estonian singing appears in Saxo Grammaticus' Gesta Danorum (c. 1179), which describes Estonian warriors singing at night while awaiting battle. Between 1774 and 1782, August W. Hupel included samples of folksongs alongside descriptions of Estonian folklore and beliefs in his Topographische Nachrichten von Liv- und Estland. Subsequently, Johann Gottfried von Herder published German translations of seven Estonian folk songs in his 1778 work Volkslieder, which was later republished in 1807 as Stimmen der Völker in Liedern. The first scholarly anthology dedicated to the subject was Alexander H. Neus' three-volume Ehstnische Volkslieder (1850–1852), which contains 1,300 songs provided in both Estonian and German translation.

=== Folksong types ===
- Regilaul (runic song), an form of ancient Finnic oral poetry
- Seto leelo, a polyphonic singing of the Seto people, recognized by UNESCO
- Hällilaulud (lullabies), traditional rhythmic songs used to soothe children, often repetitive
- Kiigelaulud (swing songs), runic songs traditionally performed by women during communal village swinging

=== Publications with folksongs ===
- Vana Kannel (The Old Harp), a series of publications containing thousands of regilaul collected by Jakob Hurt
- Setukeste laulud (The Setos' Songs), a three-volume collection documenting heritage in the Seto region

=== Notable folksongs ===
- Heeringas (song) (The Herring Song), a well-known, humorous folk song about a herring that lived on dry land.
- Saaremaa Waltz (Saaremaa valss), a contemporary folk classic with music by Raimond Valgre and lyrics by Debora Vaarandi.
- Mu isamaa on minu arm (My Fatherland is My Love), a poem by Lydia Koidula set to music by Aleksander Kunileid and later Gustav Ernesaks, often considered the unofficial national anthem.
- The Baltics Are Waking Up, a trilingual folk-style song that became a symbol of the Singing Revolution and the Baltic Way.
- Koit (The Dawn), a patriotic song by Tõnis Mägi that served as a defining anthem of the late 1980s restoration of independence.

== Proverbs, Riddles, and Superstitions ==
The Estonian Folklore Archives houses over 15,000 recorded types of proverbs (vanasõnad). These contain advice that ranges from when to plant crops to advice on moral issues and superstitions. Proverbs in Estonia functioned as a practical framework for navigating a world perceived as inhabited by spirits and personified natural forces. They influenced daily decision-making and had information about seasons and planting cycles. Additionally, many beliefs were a form of environmental protection. For instance, the strict rules regarding sacred groves prevented the overexploitation of timber and natural resources.

Similarly, there are also kõnekäänud, or Estonian idioms. These evolved over time and are a mix of native metaphors and terms borrowed from German, Russian, and other neighbouring languages. There is high regional diversity, with some common phrases having over 20 dialectal variations.

Superstitions within these often provided a sense of psychological security and control over unpredictable events such as crop failure, disease, or the dangers and by adhering to specific taboos and performing rituals, individuals believed they could negotiate with the spiritual realm. Riddles (mõistatused) were used for social competition and intellectual stimulation. Riddles also provided competitive entertainment. J.W. Boecler described Estonian superstitions in 1685.

== Documentation ==
During the Estophile Enlightenment Period (1750–1840) at the start of the 19th century, Baltic Germans developed an increased interest in Estonian folklore. J.H. Rosenplänter founded Beiträge zur genauern Kenntniß der ehstnischen Sprache, a journal dedicated to the study of the Estonian language, literature, and folklore. The German translation of Mythologia Fennica by Kristjan Jaak Peterson was published in 1822 in the same journal.

Estonian folklore is well documented. Friedrich Reinhold Kreutzwald began his systematic collection of folklore in 1843, focusing heavily on the Virumaa region. Unlike later collectors who prioritised word-for-word accuracy, Kreutzwald viewed folk stories as needing artistic refinement to be accessible to a broader audience and, as such, he altered the tales considerably. Many of the stories he collected were from Virumaa and were reworked before being published in 1866 as Eesti rahva ennemuistsed jutud (The Ancient Tales of the Estonian People). He also worked on the compilation of the national epic, Kalevipoeg, which he constructed by weaving together folk legends to bridge narrative gaps.

Jakob Hurt, president of the Society of the Estonian Literati, initiated a systematic nationwide folklore collection in the 1870s that resulted in approximately 12,400 pages of manuscripts. This work led to the publication of Vana Kannel (The Old Harp), with the first two volumes appearing between 1875 and 1876, followed by subsequent volumes in 1938 and 1941. From 1904 to 1907, Hurt also published a three-volume collection called Setukeste laulud (The Setos' Songs). Inspired by these efforts, Matthias Johann Eisen began his own collection of folklore in the 1880s, eventually accumulating over 90,000 pages of material. During this period, Oskar Kallas became the first doctoral folklore scholar of Estonian descent.

After the establishment of the Republic of Estonia, Walter Anderson was appointed to the newly founded chair of folklore at the University of Tartu. Some of Anderson's students were Oskar Loorits and et:August Annist. Loorits became the director of the Estonian Folklore Archives, founded in 1927. His major field was folk religion and mythology, a study on Estonian, Livonian and Russian folk beliefs. His most monumental work Grundzüge des estnischen Volksglaubens was published from 1949 to 1957 in Copenhagen. Arvo Krikmann and Ingrid Sarv assembled the five-volume Estonian proverb collection "Eesti vanasõnad" between 1980 and 1988.

=== Organisations ===
In 1839, the Learned Estonian Society was founded as the central organisation for collecting and studying Estonian folklore. Friedrich Robert Faehlmann published several Estonian legends and myths in German. These were based on authentic Estonian folklore and Christfried Ganander's Finnish mythology. Ganander (1741–1790) was a Finnish folklorist who wrote Mythologia Fennica (1789), which was a reference book on folk religion.

One of the works was "The Dawn and Dusk" (Koit ja Hämarik (Note: Because of Faehlmann's work, the philologist Nikolai Anderson authored a ballad based on this myth: Anderson, Nikolai (1905). Koit und Hämarik: eine estnische Sage. J. Anderson. hdl:10062/38703.)). Ganander's work impacted the Estonian National Awakening as Estonian poet Kristjan Jaak Peterson published a German translation of Mythologia Fennica, and Friedrich Robert Faehlmann used Ganander's work as a primary source and inspiration for his own Estonian" myths. This led to the creation of the Estonian pantheon, where figures like Vanemuine were largely modelled after the Finnish gods (such as Väinämöinen) described by Ganander.

In 1842, the Society of the Estonian Literati was founded in Tallinn. The Estonian Folklore Archives, was established in 1927 in Tartu to document folklore sites and their associated legends.

=== Collectors ===
- Jakob Hurt, started a folklore collection movement in the 1860s and compiled a 162-volume manuscript of the collection
- Matthias Johann Eisen, published a 90,000-page collection of folk traditions and beliefs.
- Oskar Loorits, the first director of the Estonian Folklore Archives (1927–1941) and a specialist in Finno-Ugric folk religion
- Oskar Kallas, the first folklore scholar of Estonian descent, who organised the systematic collection of over 13,000 folk melodies
- Friedrich Reinhold Kreutzwald, the author of the national epic Kalevipoeg and a number of other stories based on folklore
- Friedrich Robert Faehlmann, a co-founder of the Learned Estonian Society who published Estonian myths and legends in German
- Walter Anderson, the first chair of folklore at the University of Tartu
- Kristjan Jaak Peterson, Estonian writer and linguist who translated the Finnish mythology Mythologia Fennica into German
- Johann Heinrich Rosenplänter, the publisher of the first journal for Estonian language and folklore studies.
- Alexander Heinrich Neus, the compiler of Ehstnische Volkslieder, considered the first scholarly anthology of Estonian folksongs

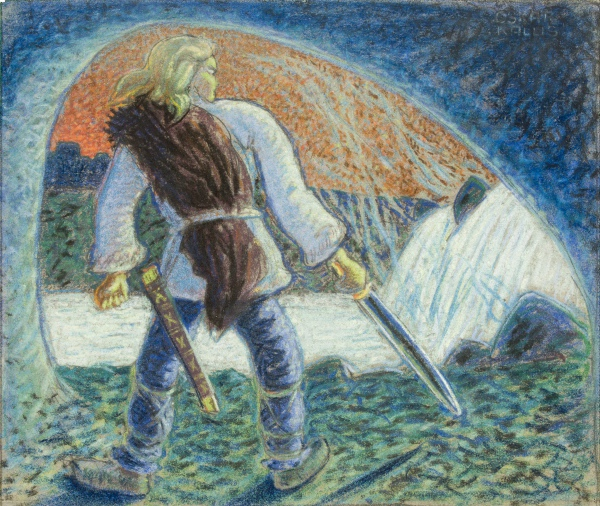
Oskar Kallis’s 1914 painting Kalevipoeg mõõgaga (Kalevipoeg with a Sword) depicts the hero in a stylized, Art Nouveau-influenced aesthetic

== Syncretism ==
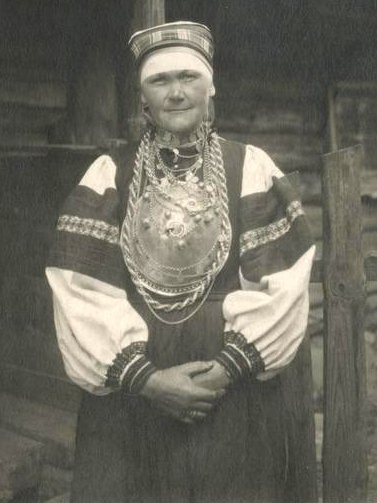
The Seto "Mother of Song" Anne Vabarna, who helped preserve the oral tradition of "leelo" singing.

In the Estonian tradition, several Christian saints were syncretised with existing deities

- Jüri, a figure interpreted as a god of agriculture and protector of horses
- Laurits, a figure associated with the mastery of fire and protector against its destructive power
- Mart, a god of fertility, provider of luck for the harvest
- Olev, the mythical builder of St. Olaf's Church, Tallinn, often portrayed as a giant or architect.
- Tõnn, a fertility god of the crops and livestock, associated with pigs

== Folklore practitioners ==
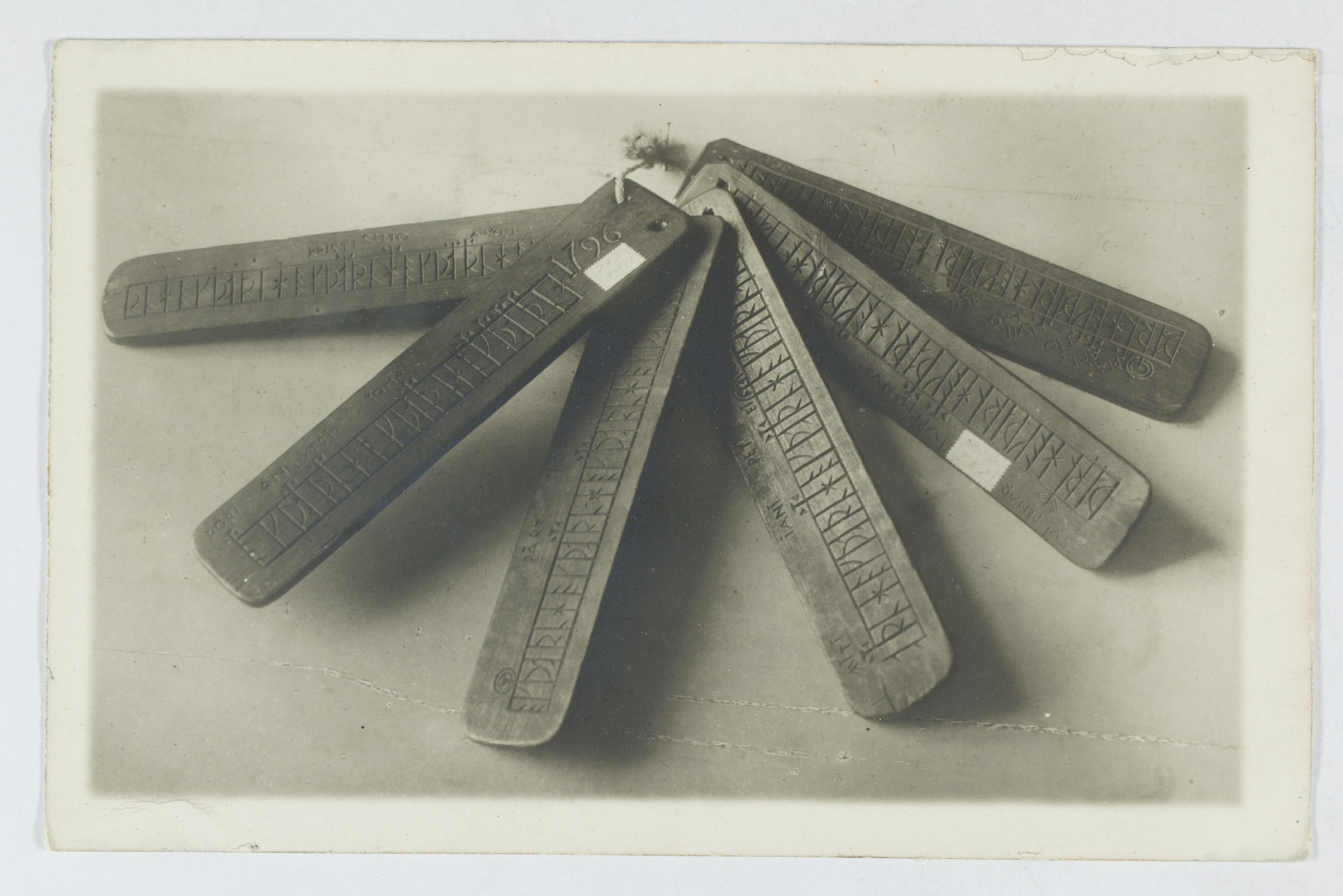
A traditional wooden "sirvikalender" used by Estonian farmers to monitor the lunar cycle and seasonal folk holidays.

- Tietäjä, a type of wise man, shaman, or singer
- Kongla Ann, a traditional healer who was accused of witchcraft, became a symbol of resistance and posthumously honored by Maavalla Koda
- Mai Kravtsov, a singer and storyteller from Kolga at the turn of the 19th century
- Anne Vabarna, a singer, known as the Seto "mother of song" (lauluema)

== Folk calendar ==
In 1578, Balthasar Russow described the celebration of midsummer (jaanipäev), St. John's Day, by Estonians.

- Jaanipäev (St. John's Day), the Midsummer celebration involving bonfires and a search for a fern blossom
- Mardipäev (St. Martin's Day), an autumn festival for the harvest
- Kadripäev (St. Catherine's Day), a winter festival for blessing the livestock
- Sirvikalender, a type of folk calendar (rahvakalender) made of wood with symbols or runes on it that was used to track the lunar and agricultural cycles

== Clothing ==
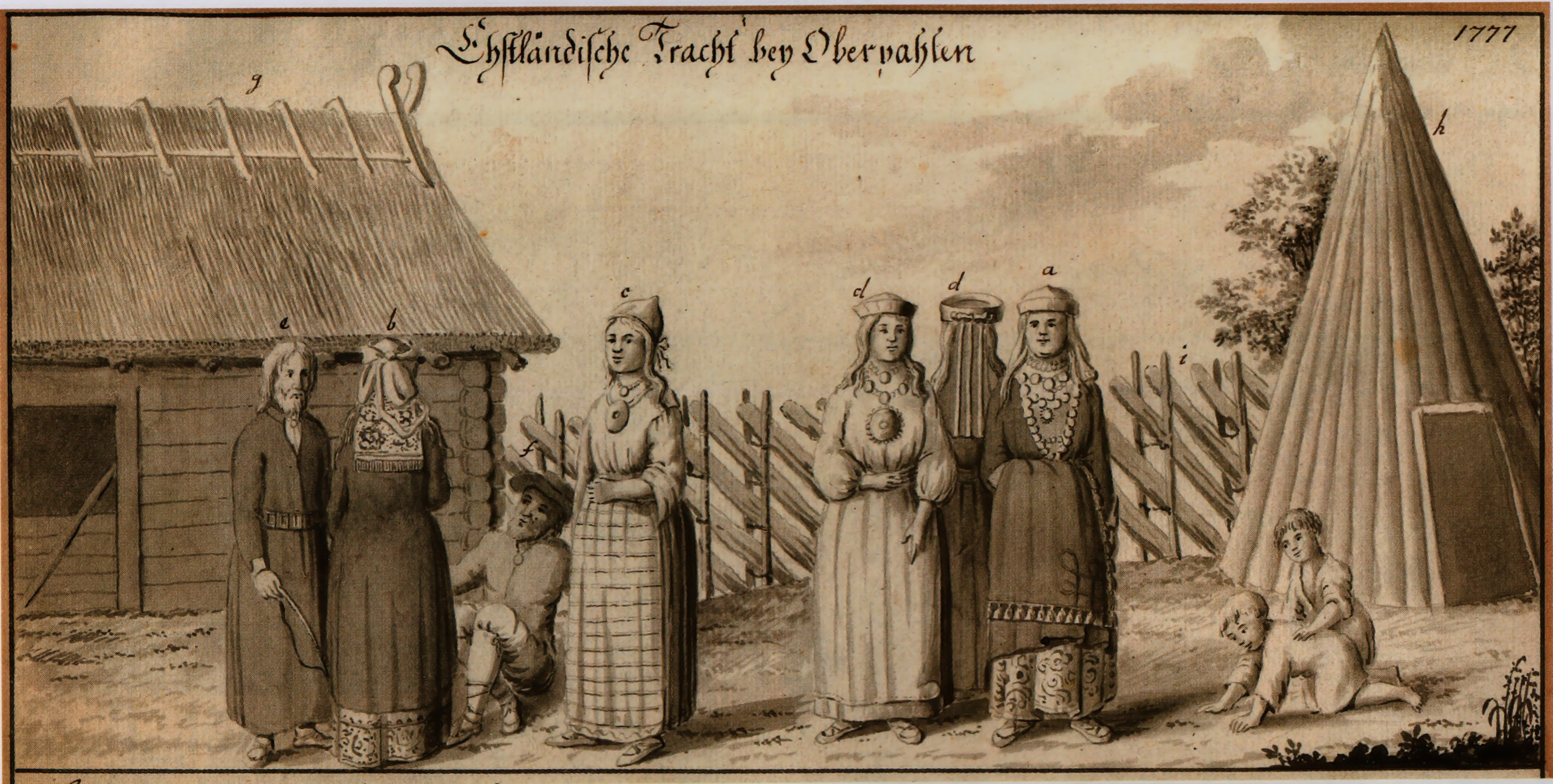
A 19th-century lithograph by Friedrich Sigismund Stern showing the folk costumes of Põltsamaa

Estonian folklore often features mythical objects imbued with protective properties. A hat of fingernails (küüntest kübar) was a magical garment, traditionally worn by the figure Vanatühi to grant the wearer the power of invisibility. The ring from the story of the Northern dragon similarly made the wearer invisible. Other textiles, like gloves (kirikindad) and belts (kirivöö), were worn as protection. They had intricate geometric patterns and red accents, thought to possess protective magic.

== Sacred sites ==
Sacred sites are locations often spoken about in local oral traditions. Hiis, or sacred groves, were areas used for prayer and communal offerings. Sacred stones were erratic boulders believed to have healing properties or to have been thrown by giants.

In 1644, Johann Gutslaff spoke of the veneration of holy springs in Estonia.

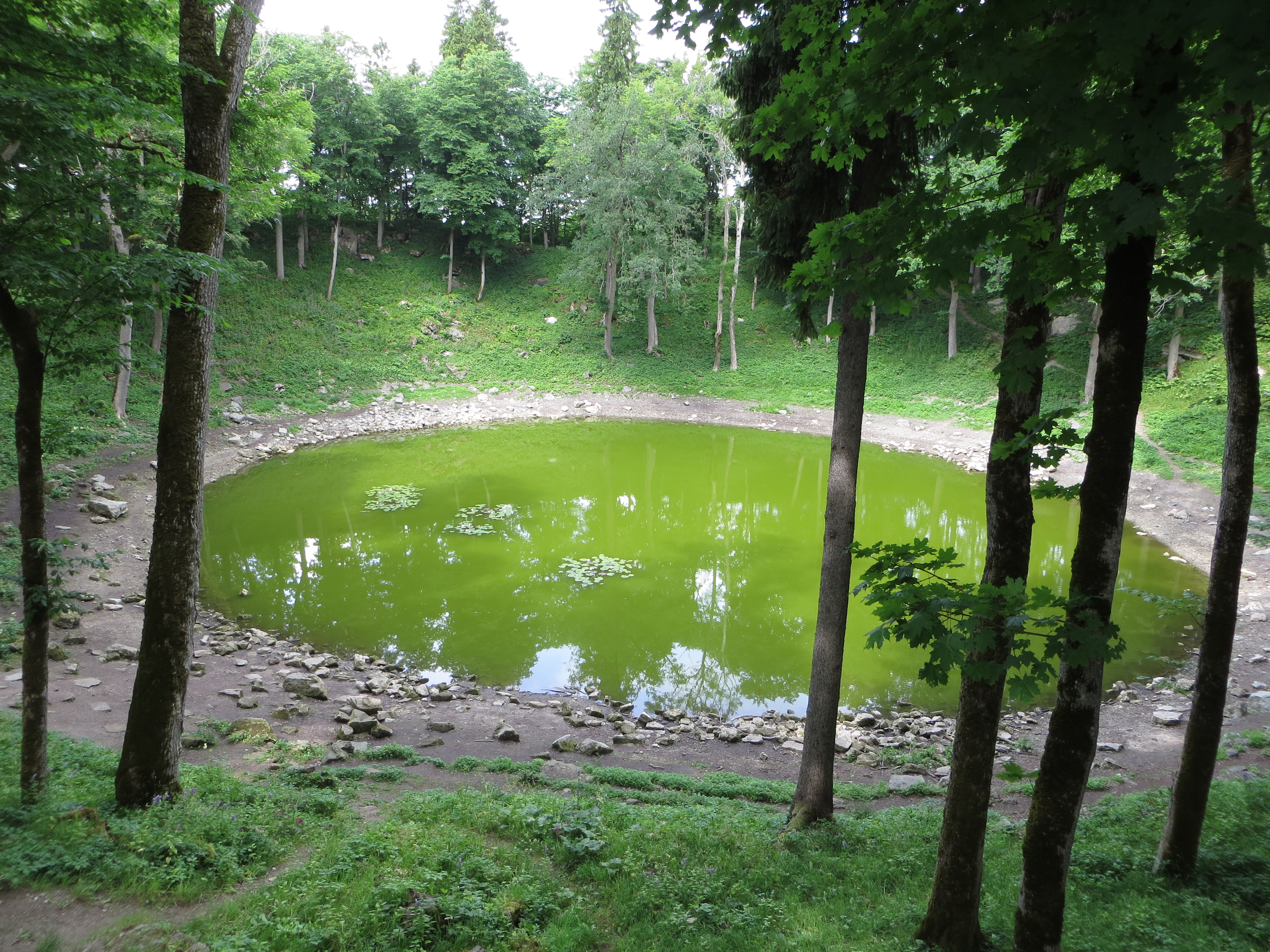
The Kaali crater on Saaremaa, a site of ancient veneration likely associated with the "fallen sun" motifs found in Estonian and Finnish runic songs.

Some notable sacred sites are:

- Meeksi Jaanikivi, a sacred stone in the Seto region
- Emaläte (Mother Spring), a spring at Väike Taevaskoda believed to heal eye problems
- Emujärv, (Mother Lake) a lake in southern Estonia believed to be inhabited by a water spirit
- Pühtitsa Convent, a religious site built on the sacred Kuremägi hill
- Emajõgi (Mother River), river in Estonian folklore, traditionally believed to have been dug by animals under the command of the god Taara

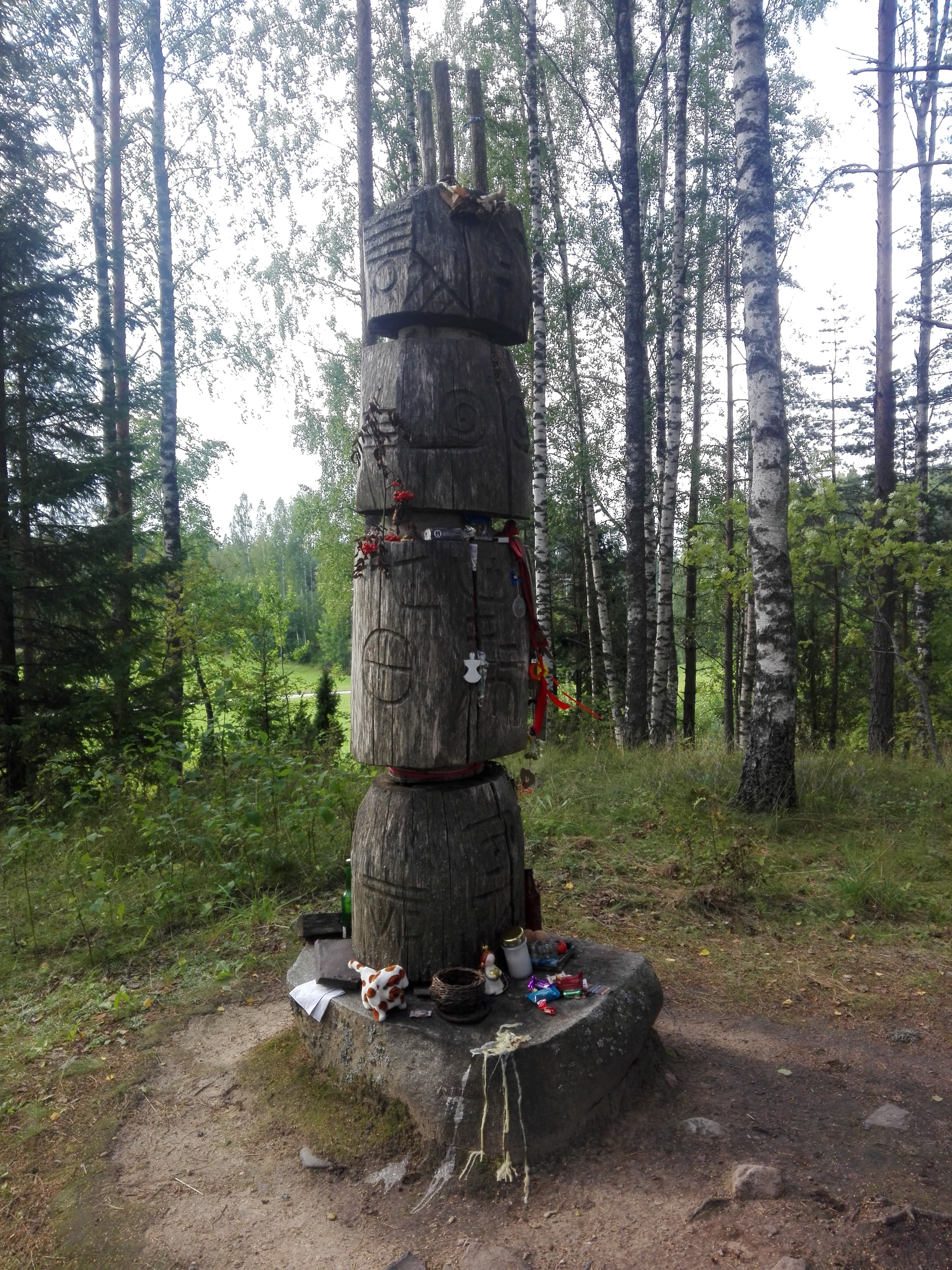
A modern wooden idol of Peko, the Seto deity of fertility, located on Jumalamägi (God's Hill) in Kolossova, where offerings are still made.

== Modern applications ==
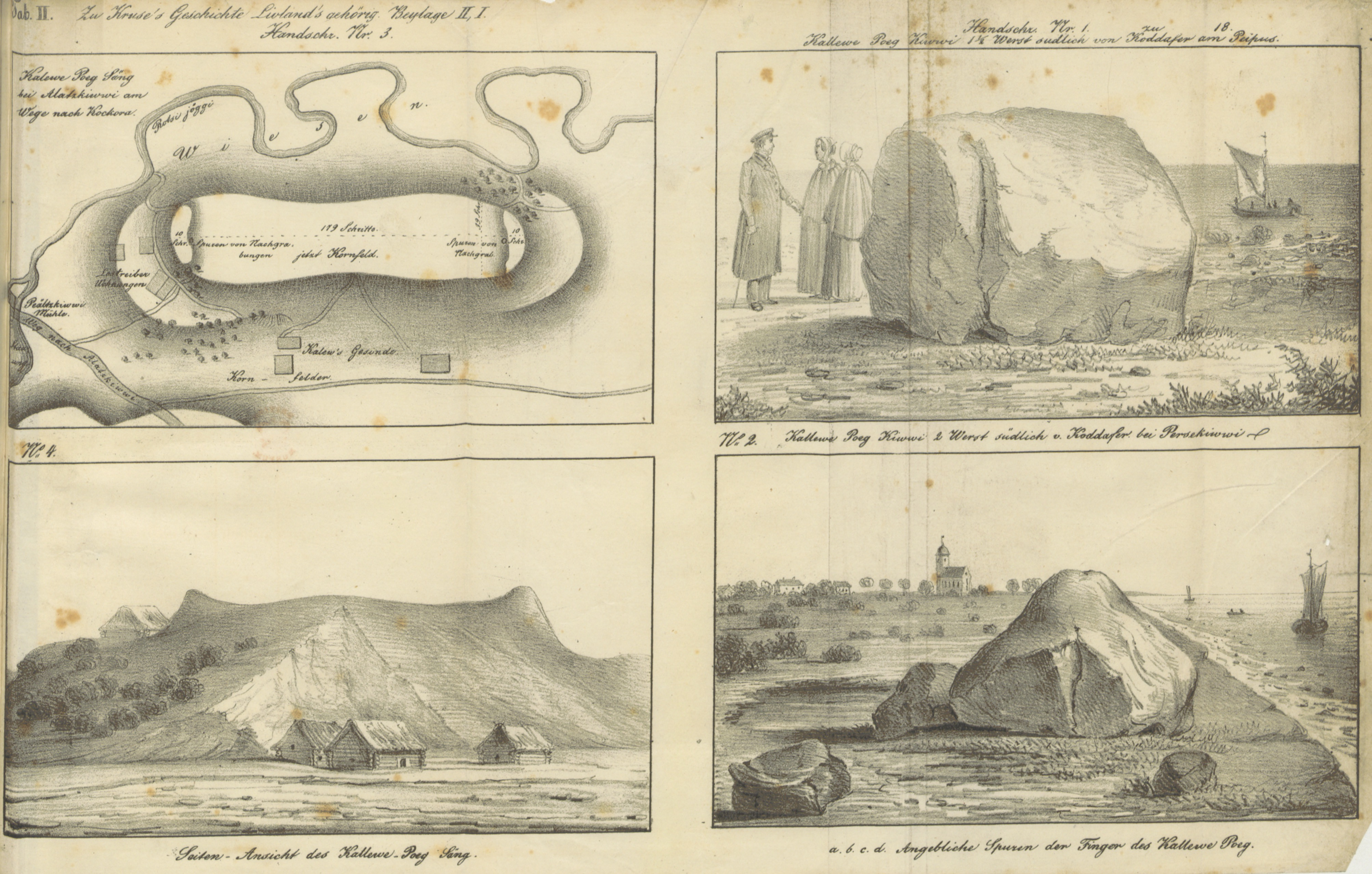
An archival illustration from Friedrich Karl Hermann Kruse's 1846 study showing an Estonian sacrificial site.

Contemporary Estonian literature and cinema frequently draw upon traditional folklore to explore themes of national identity and human nature. An example is the novel Rehepapp ehk November (The Old Barny or November) by Andrus Kivirähk, published in 2000. The story is a satirical depiction of a 19th-century Estonian village where inhabitants use mythological elements, such as the Kratt and Libahunt (werewolf), to outwit each other and their foreign landlords. The novel was adapted into a 2017 film titled November, directed by Rainer Sarnet. Kivirähk further explored these themes in his 2007 novel The Man Who Spoke Snakish, which is an allegory for the decline of Estonian folk culture, including language and ways of life.
