= Transfiguration Church, Obinitsa =

Church building in Estonia

Transfiguration Church
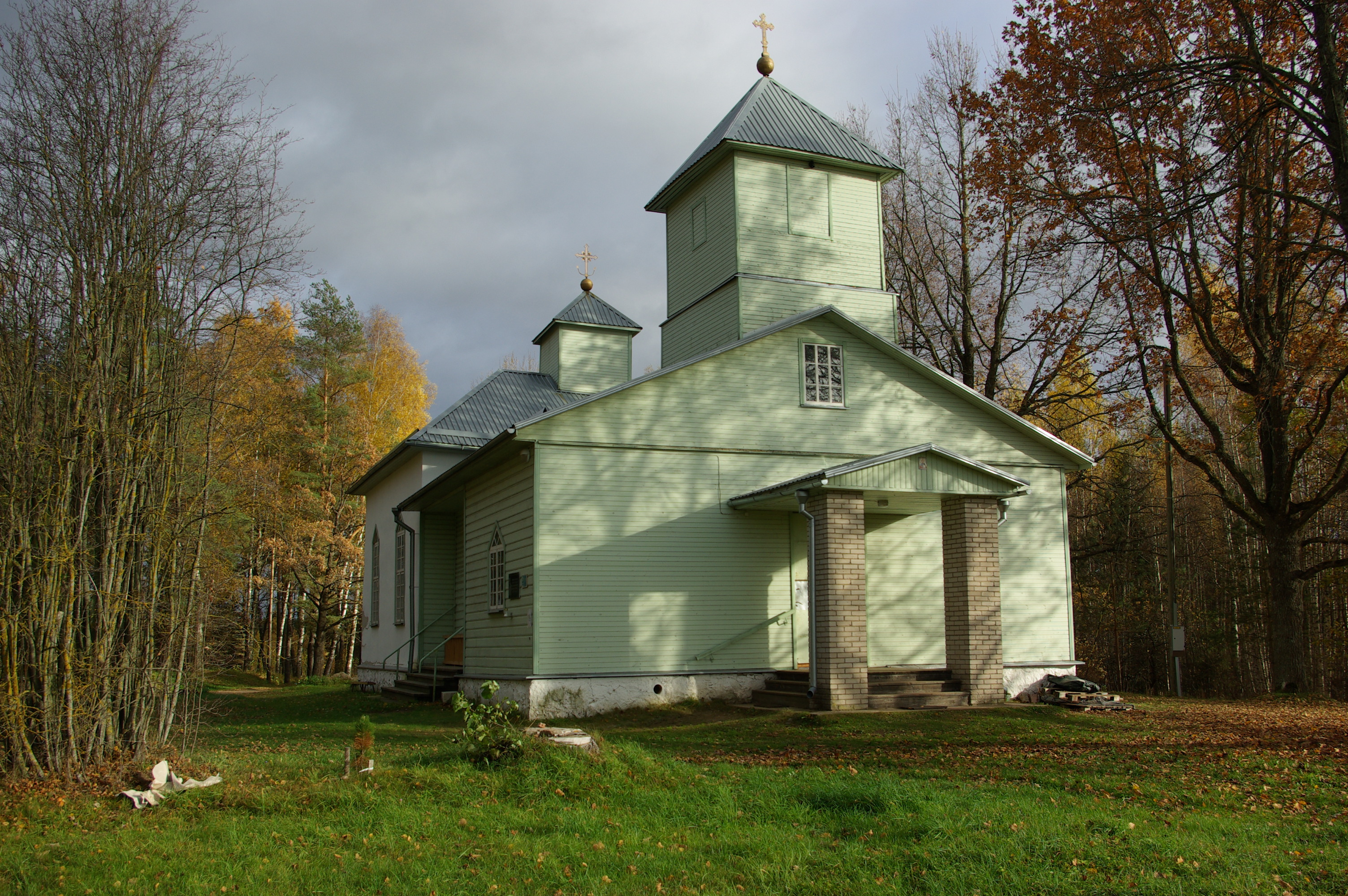

Religion
- Affiliation: Estonian Apostolic Orthodox Church
- Year consecrated: 1952

Location
- Location: Obinitsa, Meremäe Parish, Estonia
- Interactive map of Transfiguration Church
- Coordinates: 57°48′54″N 27°26′33″E

Transfiguration Church is a church belonging to the Estonian Apostolic Orthodox Church in Obinitsa, Estonia.

== History ==
The old church in Obinitsa was built in 1897 and consecrated in 1904. That structure, unique in the Baltics, was a wooden two-story building with a bell tower. In 1950, the church was closed and the building was given to the school. This action was based in Soviet anti-religious legislation, which separated church and state and forced the handover of religious properties to the state. It was based on a written regulation from the former chairman of the Estonian SSR Council of Ministers, Arnold Veimer, to the chairman of the Meremäe rural municipality executive committee.

The congregation of the closed church was given one hectare of land and two old abandoned buildings for a new church. The new church in Obinitsa is next to the cemetery by the road leading from Obinitsa to Piusa. In 1950, the local priest Vilemon Talomees, supported by the local community, began building a new church. At first he worked alone, and then congregation members joined him. The Võru County deanery did not support the building because they were busy building Meeksi Church.

On January 9, 1952, interior decorating began. Valga Church gave the Obinitsa congregation the assets from Tõrva Church (the church bell, icons, chandelier, candle sticks, altar, and vestments for the priest). Large donations of building materials came from local farmers. Material support was provided by the Bishopric of Estonia.

The church, still surrounded by scaffolding, was consecrated on June 15, 1952, by Bishop Roman of Tallinn and dedicated to the Transfiguration of Our Lord. On October 27, 1953, Bishop Roman gave Vilemon Talomees a letter of thanks for his selflessness and self-sacrifice in applying all his skills, will, and work into building a handsome new church and presbytery, with outbuildings for the Obinitsa congregation. The patriarch, who awarded him the right to wear a badge of distinction, appreciated his work.
