= Raimond Valgre =

Estonian composer

- Born: Raimond Tiisel; 7 October 1913; Riesenberg, Kreis Harrien, Governorate of Estonia, Russian Empire
- Died: 31 December 1949 (aged 36) Tallinn, then part of Estonian SSR, Soviet Union
- Genres: Popular music, folk music
- Occupations: Musician; Composer
- Instruments: Vocals, drums, piano, accordion, guitar
- Years active: 1933–1949

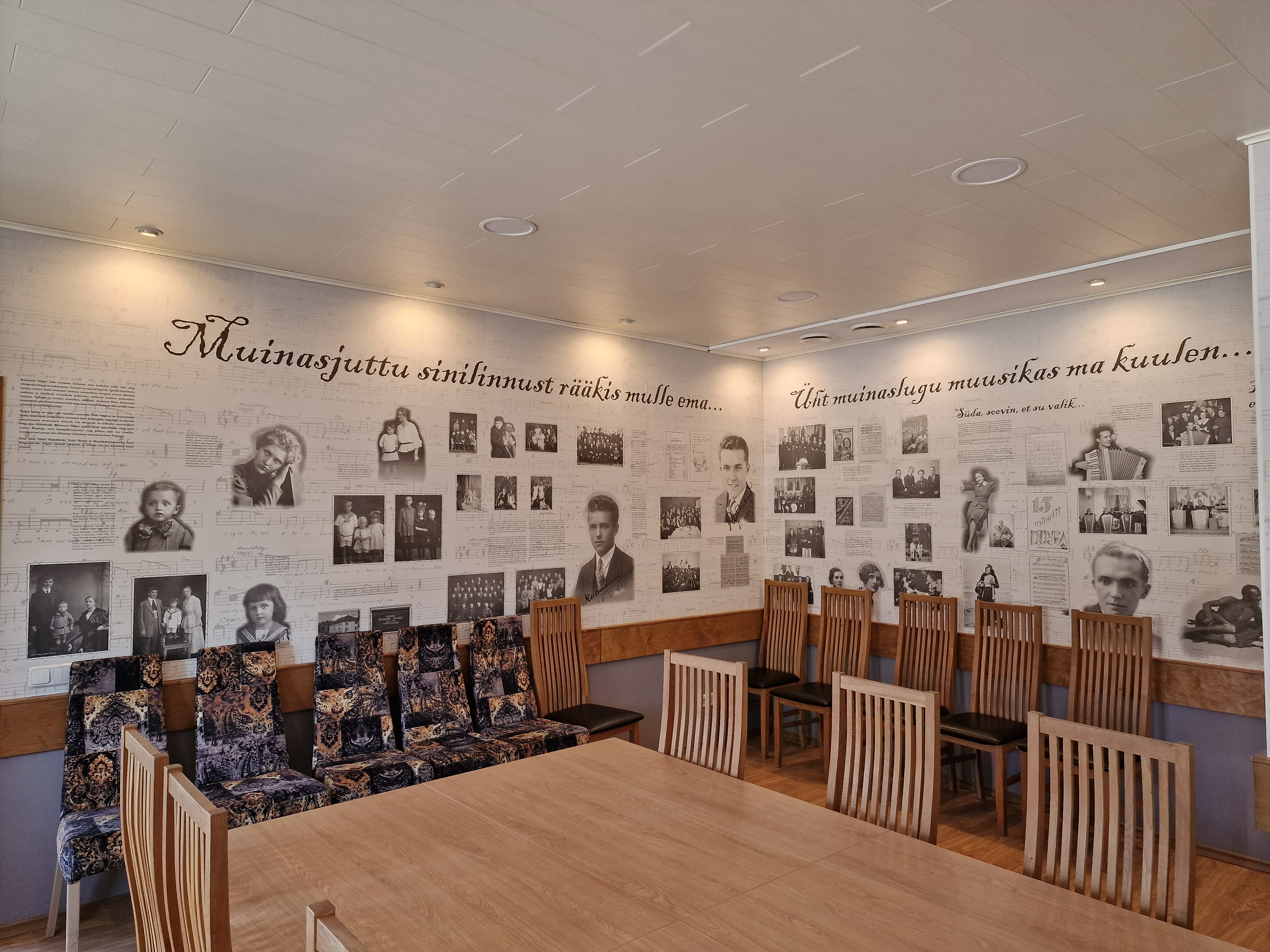
The Raimond Valgre Room at the Rapla Cultural Centre.

Raimond Valgre (born Raimond Tiisel; 7 October 1913 – 31 December 1949) was an Estonian composer and musician, whose songs have become some of the most well known in Estonia. During World War II, Valgre was conscripted into the Red Army and was a member of the orchestra for the 8th Estonian Rifle Corps. It is believed that as a result of his service on the Eastern Front Valgre suffered from alcoholism. His music was banned in 1948 by the Soviet authorities. Raimond Valgre died in an accident on 31 December 1949.

The revival of Valgre's compositions began in the Soviet Union of the 1960s. This included Armenian jazz vocalist Tatevik Oganesyan's rendition of "A Little Story in the Music" in her album Day Dream. The biographical feature film Those Old Love Letters (Need vanad armastuskirjad) followed in 1992. In 2001, guitarist Francis Goya recorded twelve of the composer's songs in his album Pleased to Meet You, Mr. Valgre. The hosts of Eurovision Song Contest 2002, Annely Peebo and Marko Matvere performed "A Little Story in the Music" as part of the interval act.

Notable work is also "Saaremaa Waltz".
