= Meeksi Estonian Apostolic Orthodox Church of St. John the Baptist =

Church building Estonia

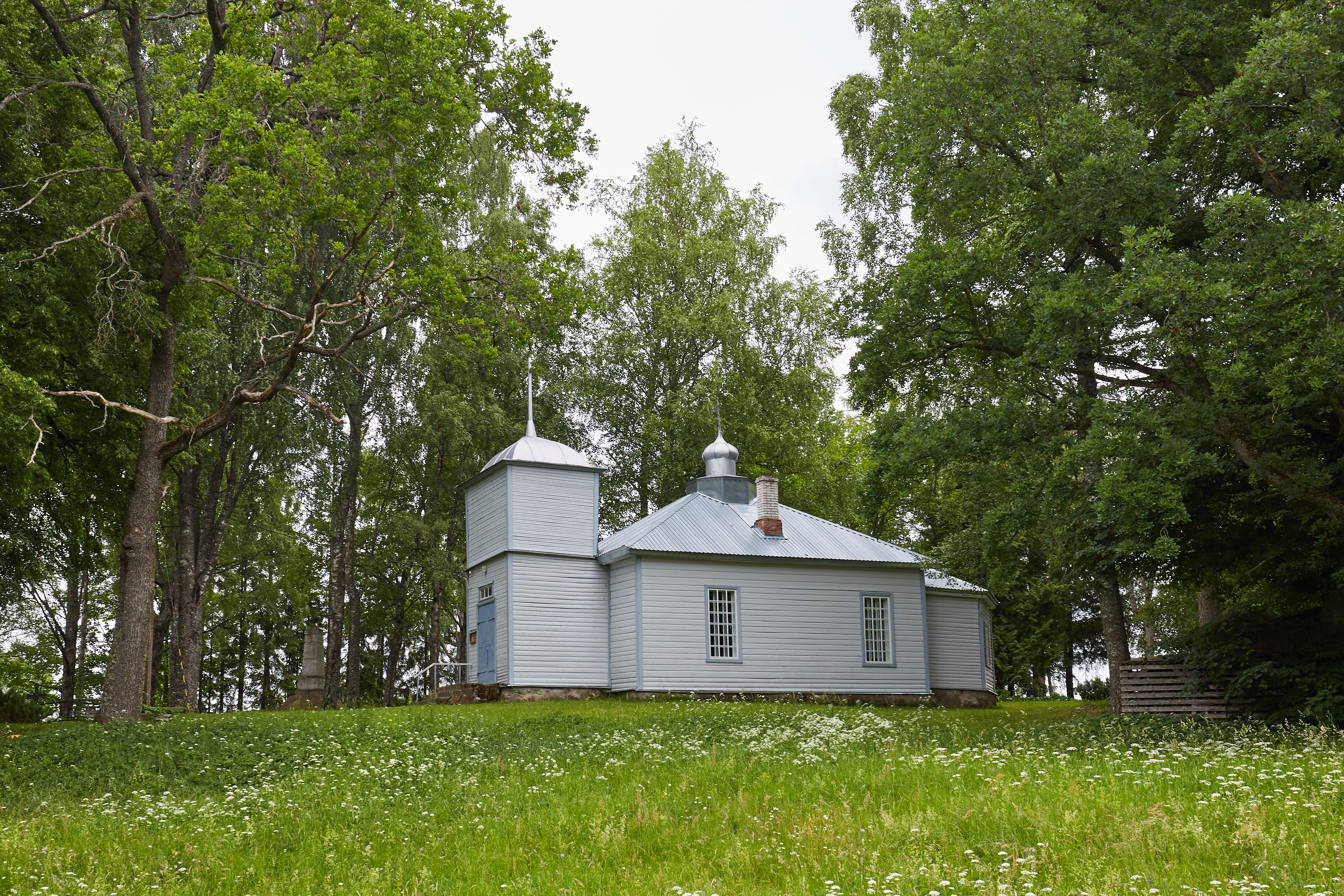
- Meeksi Estonian Apostolic Orthodox Church of St. John the Baptist

Religion
- Affiliation: Estonian Apostolic Orthodox Church
- Year consecrated: 1953

Location
- Location: Miikse, Meremäe Parish, Estonia
- Interactive map of Meeksi Estonian Apostolic Orthodox Church of St. John the Baptist
- Coordinates: 57°42′34″N 27°23′43″E

Architecture
- Completed: 1953

Meeksi Estonian Apostolic Orthodox Church of St. John the Baptist was built in 1953 in Miikse village, Meremäe rural municipality, Võru County in Estonia. The construction work was carried out during Joseph Stalin's rule by members of the congregation, on their own initiative. The building happened at night; the builders escaped persecution.

== General information ==
The greatest and most popular holiday in Meeksi church is the old Midsummer Day on the 7th of July. Over the church feasts, the people connected with the area come home to be in church in the morning. There is a procession led by a cross around the church. After church, people go visit the graves of loved ones, where they bring along food and drinks.

The church is built from wood and covered by wooden boarding. The building was renovated last in 2013 with the help of the money received by the congregation from a national programme for Estonian churches. Miikse cemetery is situated behind the church. A monument to the fallen in the Second World War is also located in the cemetery. The church is situated by Miikse stream at an intersection of roads. 80 metres southwest from the church, by the Miikse stream is Miikse jaanikivi (St. John's rock), a historical sacrificial stone. Once, Miikse Chapel was also located by the sacrificial stone. 500 metres south from Miikse Church is Miikse village square, where people celebrate old Midsummer Day as the most important holiday.
