= Heeringas (song) =

Estonian folk song

"Heeringas elas kuival maal (The Herring Lived on Dry Land)"

Song
- Genre: Estonian folk song

Heeringas (Herring), sometimes referred to as Heeringas elas kuival maal (The Herring Lived on Dry Land) or Heeringalaul (Herring Song), is an Estonian folk song. It is intended as a humorous, fictional explanation for why the sea is salty. Originating in the 19th-century rhythmic folksong tradition, it is a tavern song that uses humour to explain natural phenomena.

The song describes a fictional ancient time in which the herring was a land-dwelling animal. It eats a ship's cargo of salt, leading to the sinking of a ship and the herring's banishment to the sea as punishment. The song and its story have been referenced in popular culture from plays to animated film. The song has been performed by popular musicians and studied in schools.

== Synopsis ==
The song suggests that in ancient times, the herring was a land-dwelling animal with legs. It is described as physically and behaviorally similar to a cat, kept by humans to hunt rats and mice. The central conflict arises when a two-masted sailing ship departs with a cargo of salt. At the time, salt was a luxury commodity. The song notes that a single aam (a historical dry measure) could cost 100 gold pieces. A herring on board the ship, driven by a gluttonous craving for the salt, begins chewing through the wooden hull of the vessel to reach the cargo. This causes the vessel to sink, spilling the entire cargo into the ocean. Neptune, the god of the sea, punishes the herring for destroying the ship by banishing its entire species to the water forever. In the story, the salt dissolving into the sea provides an etiological explanation for the salinity of the ocean.

== Background ==
While it can be referred to as a folk song, it is not an ancient runic song (regilaul). It instead became popular during the pre-war period Republic of Estonia. The song belongs to the rhymed folksong tradition (riimiline rahvalaul) that emerged in the 19th century, a period when many European melodies were adapted into Estonian. It represents a more modern type of Estonian folk music, which began to displace the ancient runic song tradition in the 18th and 19th centuries. Unlike the older runic songs, which used alliteration, parallelism, and a specific eight-syllable meter without rhyming, the rhymed folk song adopted Western European musical structures. Key characteristics included the use of end-rhymes and clear four-line stanzas, and accompaniment by the fiddle or accordion.

The Baltic herring (Clupea harengus) is caught frequently in Estonia and is an important staple, often salted and preserved.

It was a maritime song derived from a folk tune likely from Muhu or Saaremaa. A version of the folksong was popularized by Artur Rinne. The most well-known version was created for the 1939–1940 radio broadcasts of Laulvad Seilorid (The Singing Sailors) ensemble, after original folk lyrics were deemed unsuitable for broadcast. This version was arranged for the accordion by Hardi Tiidus with lyrics by Tiiu Targama.

== Similarities ==
The song is a classic oral etiological narrative, or a story intended to explain the origins of natural phenomena, existing prior to the written word. Within the context of comparative mythology, the song follows a motif documented in the Aarne–Thompson–Uther Index (ATU) and it also reflects a common trope in folklore around fluidity between land and sea. For instance, Selkie myths in Scottish folklore describe seals that can shed their skins to walk on land. As in many animal myths, the animal is transformed as a result of their greed. The song also mirrors the Just So Stories structure popularized by Rudyard Kipling, where an animal's physical traits or habitat are explained in the story as a result of a specific moral failing or encounter with a deity.

The song's narrative is closely linked to the Finnic myths, specifically the evolution of the Sampo cycle. The transition of the herring from land to sea is a representative example of movement between worlds in Finno-Karelian cosmology where myths adapt into newer traditions while maintaining their core etiological functions. The story shares thematic elements with "tales of magic" (ATU types 300–749) about a mill at the bottom of the sea, specifically ATU 565 ("The Magic Mill"), explaining why the sea is salty. In Norse mythology, the Prose Edda poem Grottasöngr also uses myth as a way of explaing features of the around in which two giants forced to grind a magic millstone, Grotti, for King Fróði. After a sea-king kills Fróði and captures the mill, he commands it to grind salt. The mill eventually sinks the ship, continuing to grind salt at the bottom of the ocean forever. A Norwegian variant recorded by Asbjørnsen and Moe tells of a poor man who receives a magic mill from the devil that, through a series of mishaps, ends up on a ship and is commanded to grind salt, which eventually sinks it. The story was included in The Blue Fairy Book (1889) edited by Andrew Lang.

== In popular culture ==
In Juhan Smuul's 1957 play Atlandi ookean (The Atlantic Ocean), the song is used to illustrate the way culture is alienated in the development of a formal national rhetoric. In one scene, the character Köster dismisses the "Herring Song" in favor of "a proper patriotic song," specifically "Viljandi paadimees" (The Boatman of Viljandi).

In 1969, an animated film Eesel, heeringas ja nõialuud (English: The Donkey, the Herring, and the Witch's Broom) retold the story from the song in cartoon form. It is an anthology film focused on folklore, directed and written by Elbert Tuganov, produced by the Tallinnfilm studio.

The Estonian bluegrass band Curly Strings recorded a version of the song for their 2014 album. The ensemble Lõõtspillipoisid ("The Melodeon Boys"), a traditional Estonian music ensemble featuring musicians Enrik Visla on violin, Ain Lindvest on the melodeon, and Jaagup Kippar on bass, also plays the song in their sets. The song is typically sung at social gatherings, birthdays, and by choirs, and is featured in the songbooks of academic associations, such as Korp! Sakala.
