= Mythologia Fennica =

1789 book by Kristfrid Ganander

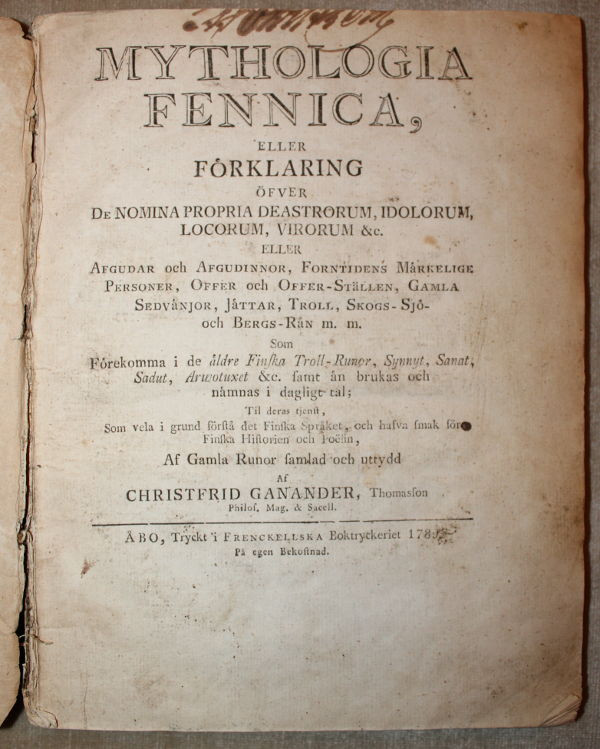
Title sheet of the 1st edition of Mythologia Fennica

Mythologia Fennica (lit. 'Finnish Mythology') is a 1789 book on Finnish mythology written in Swedish by Kristfrid Ganander, a Finnish priest.

Mythologia Fennica contains 430 entries in alphabetical order from "AARNI" to "YRJÄNÄ". Entries cover Finnish mythology, folk poetry, spells, Sámi mythology, and the Norse gods.

The work influenced Elias Lönnrot, compiler of the epic Kalevala; as a result, Ganander has been later perceived as a kind of "Lönnrot before Lönnrot."

== Publication and translation ==
Mythologia Fennica was intended as an appendix to a Swedish-Finnish dictionary which was left unfinished by Ganander. It was created with the encouragement and assistance of Henrik Gabriel Porthan, the father of Finnish historical research. It was completed in 1789 but only published 4 years later, following Porthan's review.

A German translation was made by the Estonian poet Kristjan Jaak Peterson in 1821.

The book has been reprinted numerous times, especially towards the end of the 20th century.
