= Maa-alused =

Creatures in Estonian folklore

Maa-alused are, in Estonian folk religion, mysterious elf-like creatures which live beneath the ground. They were believed to have a parallel existence to that of humans, the principal differences being that all orientations are reversed, such that up becomes down and left becomes right, and that all things possessed by them are diminished in size.
