= Jaanikivi =

Boulder and sacrificial stone in Estonia

Coordinates: 57°42′32.44″N 27°23′39″E

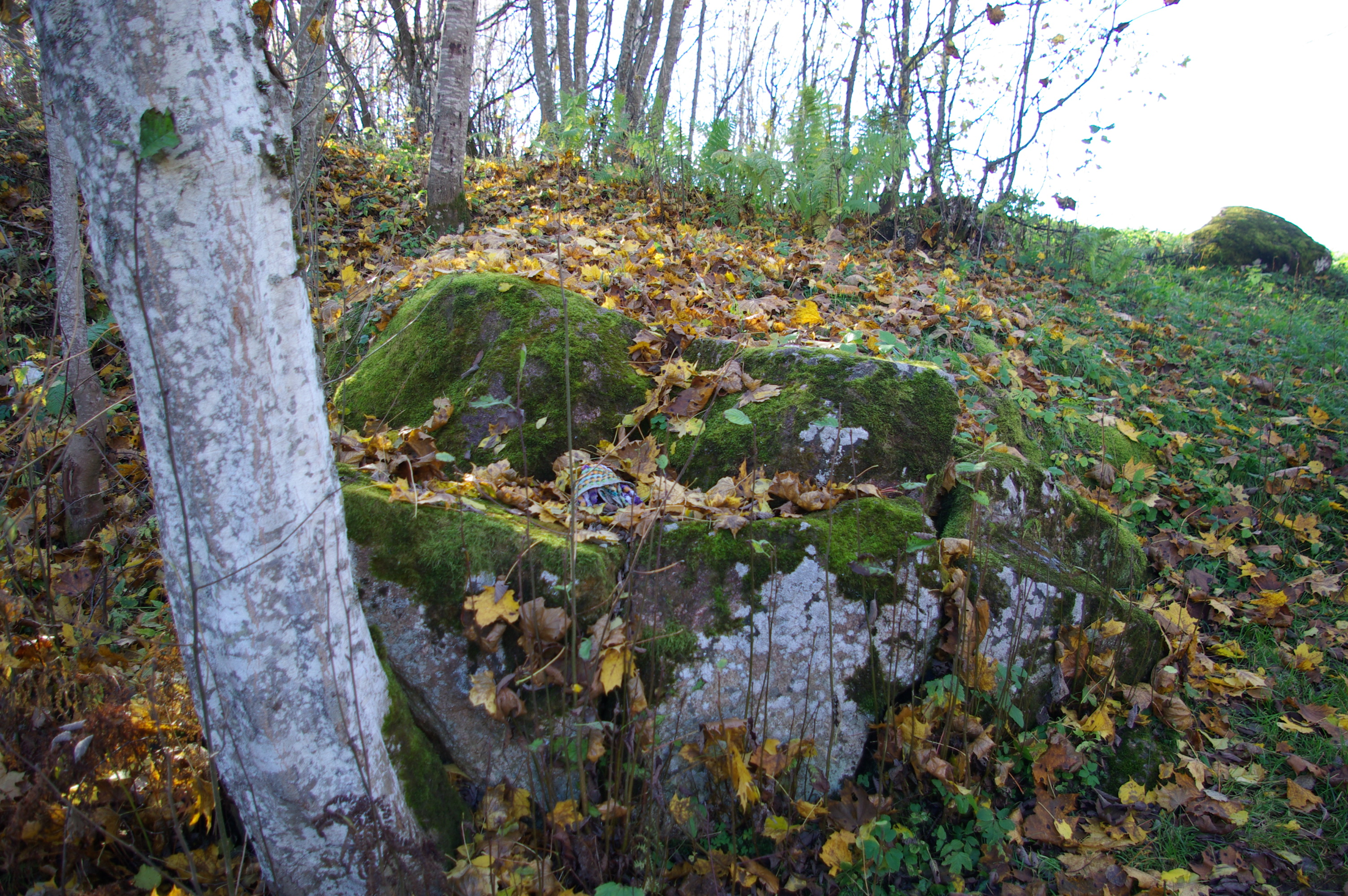
Miikse Jaanikivi

Jaanikivi ('St John's stone') is a sacrificial stone in Võru County, Meremäe rural municipality in Miikse village near Miikse church by Miikse Stream in Estonia.

== General information ==
It is said that Saint John himself once sat on the rock, resting his feet. Even today some people believe that the stone has miraculous powers and sick persons are brought to the stone and a sore hand or foot pressed against its surface. The spring water from the Miikse Stream flowing near St. John's Stone (the so-called eye spring) is also believed to have a healing effect. St John's stone is registered as an archaeological monument. During the time of Baltic-German landlords, the local landlord dismantled the rock into pieces and took the pieces in the cow-shelter wall. This kind of conduct, however, brought ruin and illnesses among the manor herd, so the landlord had the pieces of the rock taken back to its place.

== Lore ==
Information in Eisen folklore poetry collection dating back to 1915: In Vastseliina parish, near Meeksi village (a Seto village near Pihkva border) by a small stream, that separates Liivi province from Pihkva province, there is a stone, where Seto people still bring sacrifices. The stone stands in Liivi province. It is called St John's Stone. People say: St John used to sleep on the stone. Every St John's Day, a Russian priest comes to the stone and Seto people from every corner of Setumaa come to the stone and bring sacrifice to St John. The sacrifices are mostly butter and eggs. If Servitude of God be ended, the priest takes half the sacrifice and the other half is for the poor. When Servitude of God is held, the river is said to have holy water in it and if the ill wash themselves in the water, the illness disappears. At one time, when a cow-shelter was made in Meeksi village, a piece was taken from St John's stone and laid in the wall, so that cows would not die. When the shelter was finished, every year two-three cows still died. Then the piece of St John's stone was taken from the wall and there were no deaths among the animals anymore. (E 49367 (1) < Vastseliina region — R. Tamm (1915))

According to the lore originating from 1953, cottage cheese and wool made exactly for this purpose were taken to the St John's stone: A week before St John's Day, St John's milk was taken: the milk was skimmed and cottage cheese was made. It was taken to Meeksi and placed on the St John's stone. Wool was also placed on the stone. Whatever was taken on the stone, the poor got for their own after. Those, who had something wrong with them, drove to Meeksi St John's stone on St John's Day. Who had something wrong with their eyes, wiped their eyes with a towel and put the towel on the stone. A spring is near the stone, water was taken from there to moisten (hämmäma) the eyes. (RKM II 44, 481/2 (11) < Vastseliina region, Obinitsa < Setumaa, Navike village — U. Mägi < Anna Kuusik, about 70 y (1953)).

The site features in a description provided in The Golden Bough by James George Frazer (with a reference to a "James Piggul, steward of the estate of Panikovitz, in a report to Baron de Bogouschefsky, Journal of the Anthropological Institute, iii. (1874) pp. 274 sq."):

"On the rivulet Micksy, between the governments of Pskov and Livonia in Russia, there stood a stunted, withered, but holy oak, which received the homage of the neighbouring peasantry down at least to 1874. An eyewitness has described the ceremonies. He found a great crowd of people, chiefly Esthonians of the Greek Church, assembled with their families about the tree, all dressed in gala costume. Some of them had brought wax candles and were fastening them about the trunk and in the branches. Soon a priest arrived, and, having donned his sacred robes, proceeded to sing a canticle, such as is usually sung in the Orthodox Church in honour of saints. But instead of saying as usual, "Holy saint, pray the Lord for us," he said, "Holy Oak Hallelujah, pray for us." Then he incensed the tree all round. During the service the tapers on the oak were lighted, and the people, throwing themselves on the ground, adored the holy tree. When the pastor had retired, his flock remained till late at night, feasting, drinking, dancing, and lighting fresh tapers on the oak, till everybody was drunk and the proceedings ended in an orgy."
