= Miikse =

Village in Estonia

- Village
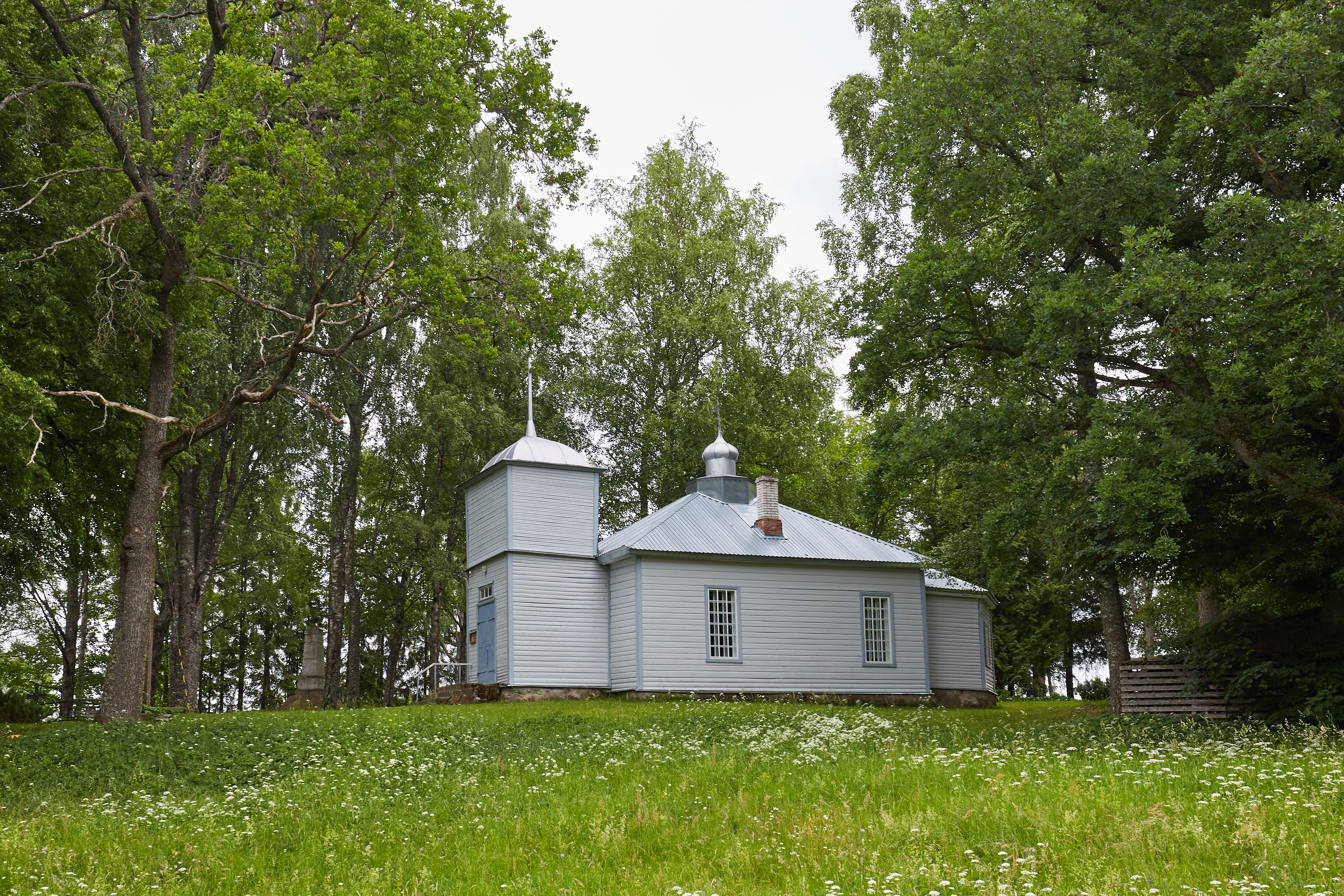
- Miikse Church

- Location in Estonia
- Coordinates: 57°42′39″N 27°23′40″E
- Country: Estonia
- County: Võru County
- Municipality: Setomaa Parish

Population (01.01.2009)
  - Total: 52

Miikse (also known as Meeksi, Miiksi, Megusitsa) is a village in Setomaa Parish, Võru County, southeastern Estonia. It has a population of 52 (as of 1 January 2009).

Meeksi Saint John the Baptist church was built in 1953. In that time Estonia was under Joseph Stalin's rule. The local people finished the work by building at nights.
