= Seto leelo =

Music genre

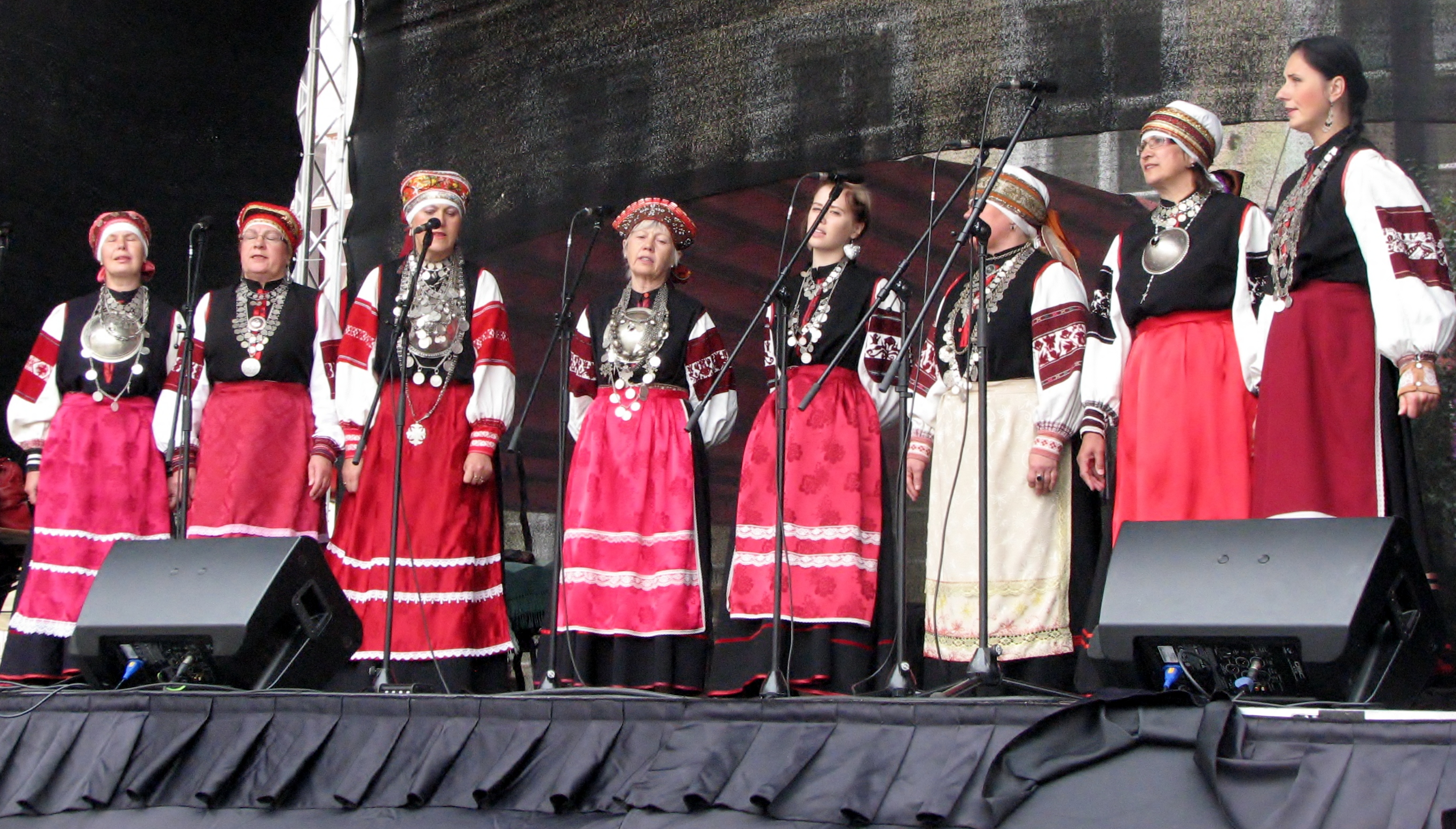
- Musical group Siidisõsarõ is performing Seto leelo (2012)
- Cultural origins: Setos
- Typical instruments: Human voice

Seto Leelo, Seto polyphonic singing tradition
- UNESCO Intangible Cultural Heritage
- Country: Estonia
- Reference: 00173
- Region: Europe and North America

Inscription history
- Inscription: 2009 (4th session)
- List: Representative

Seto leelo is the Setos' polyphonic style of folk singing.

In 2009, the Seto leelo was added to the UNESCO list of intangible cultural heritage. Seto leelo is usually performed by women, dressed in traditional clothing. During the Seto Kingdom Day celebration, the winning lead singer of a leelo group is awarded the title of "Mother of Song".

== Discography ==
- Setusongs. Recorded in Värska und Obinitsa in May 1990. CD produced by Global Music Centre und Mipu Music (MIPUCD 104) 1991
