= Kristjan Jaak Peterson =

Estonian writer

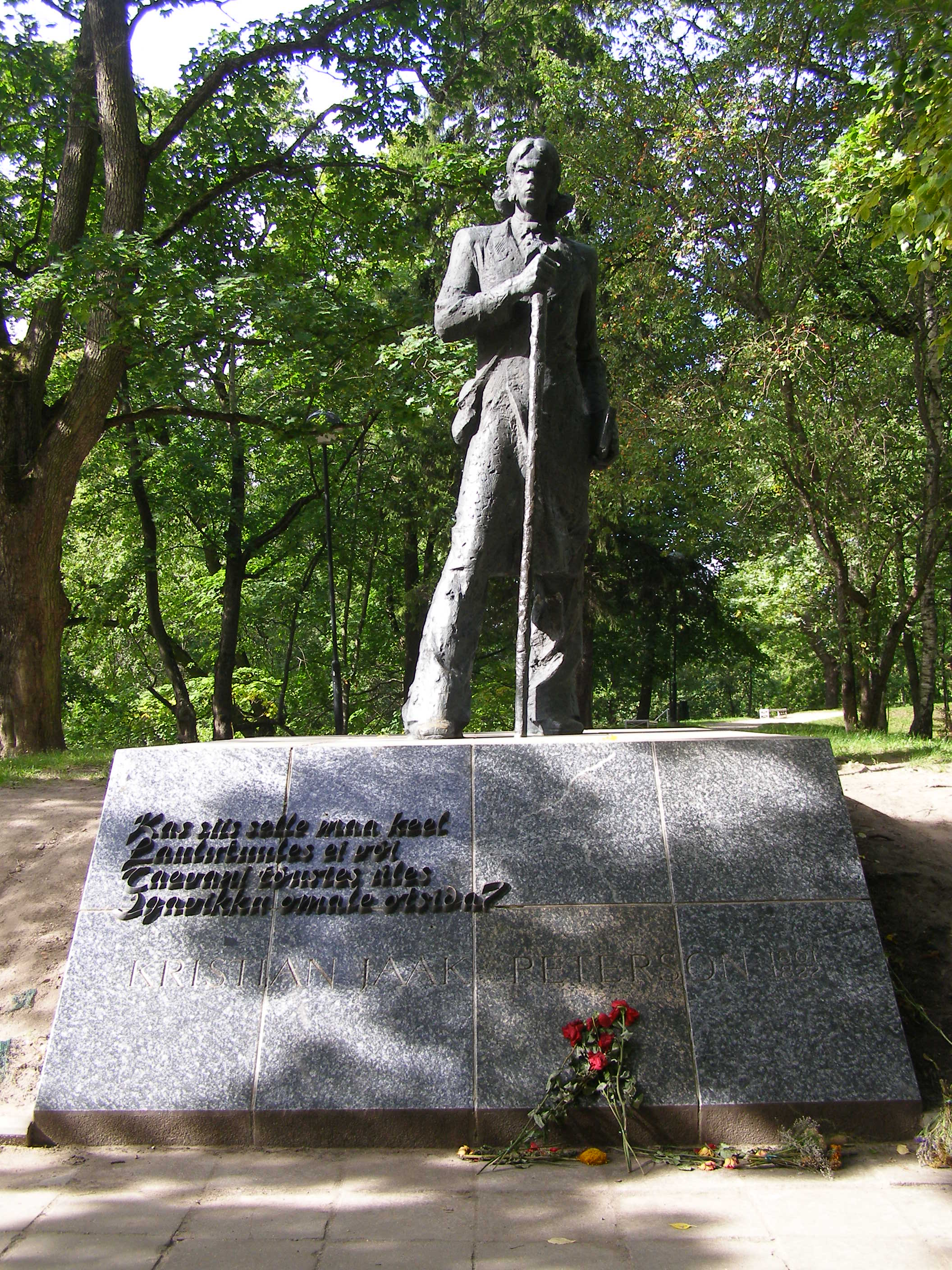
- Statue of Kristian Jaak Peterson on Toome Hill, Tartu
- Born: 14 March 1801; Riga, Russian Empire
- Died: 4 August 1822 (aged 21); Riga, Russian Empire
- Other name: Christian Jacob Petersohn
- Occupation: poet
- Known for: founder of modern Estonian poetry

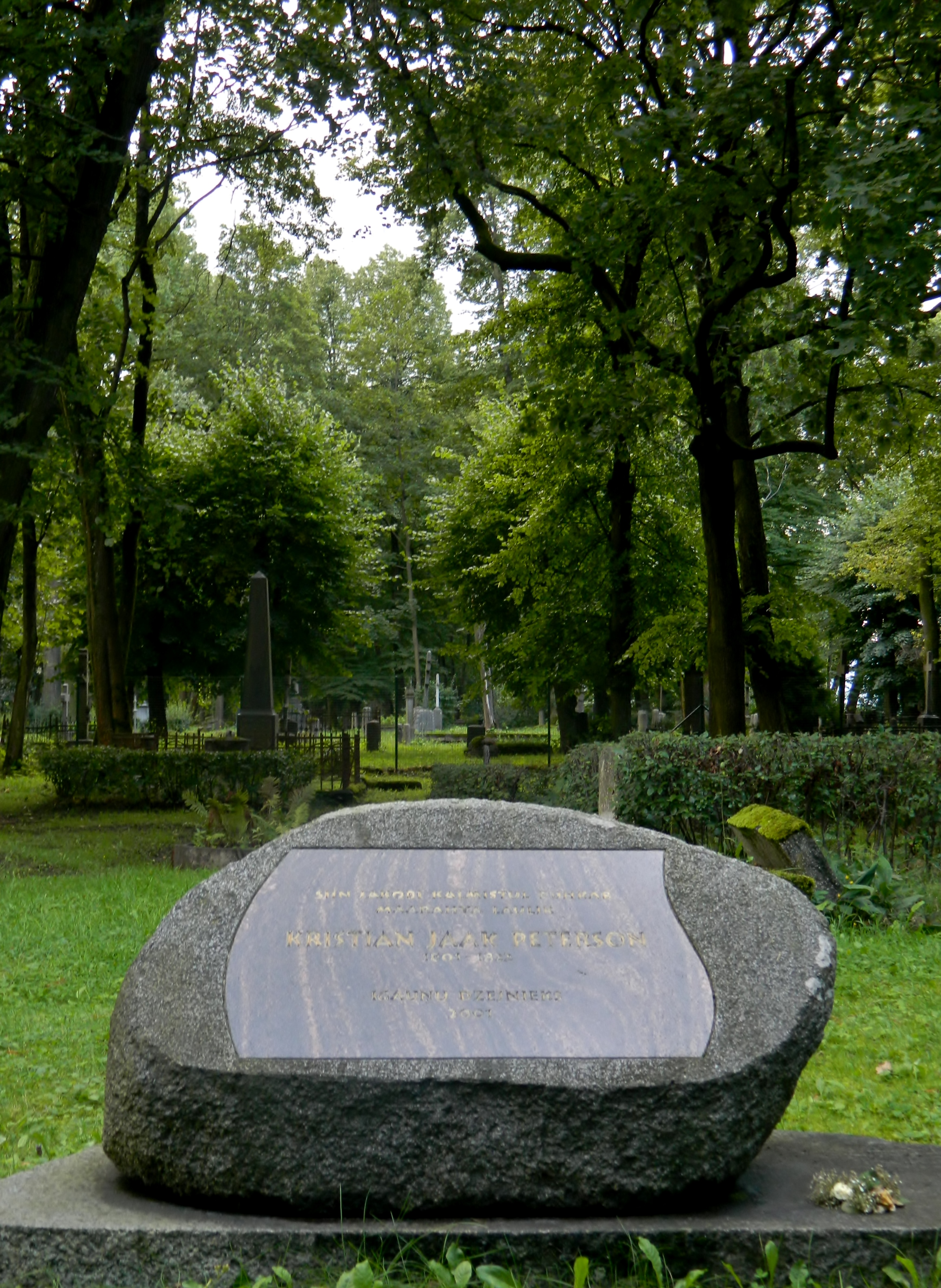
Grave of Kristjan Jaak Peterson in Pokrov Cemetery, Riga

Kristjan Jaak Peterson (14 March [O.S. 2 March] 1801, Riga – 4 August [O.S. 23 July] 1822, Riga), also known as Christian Jacob Petersohn, was an Estonian poet, commonly regarded as a herald of Estonian national literature and the founder of modern Estonian poetry.

His birthday on March 14 is celebrated in Estonia as Mother Tongue Day.

== Biography and work ==
He was born on 14 March 1801 in Riga. Best known as an Estonian poet, he is commonly regarded as a herald of Estonian national literature and the founder of modern Estonian poetry. His literary career was cut short by the tuberculosis that killed him at the age of 21.

Peterson began writing poems and prose reflections in high school. He published articles about the Estonian language in Johann Heinrich Rosenplänter's journal "Beiträge zur genauern Kenntniß der ehstnischen Sprache". 21 poems in Estonian and 3 in German have been preserved from his poetry. The main part is made up of heroic-philosophical odes, characterized by sublime wording rich in color and contrast, and pastorals with a simpler verse texture, in which there are motifs and forms of Estonian folk songs; the influence of ancient literature (Theokritos) and pre-romantics (Friedrich Gottlieb Klopstock) is also evident.

Cannot the tongue of this land,
In the wind of incantation,
Rising up to the heavens,
Seek eternity?

— Kristjan Jaak Peterson

Those lines by Peterson have been interpreted as a claim to reestablish the birthright of the Estonian language. After the University of Tartu was reopened in 1802, but with lectures given in German only, Kristjan Jaak Peterson became the first university student to acknowledge his Estonian origin, contributing to the Estonian National Awakening.

Kristjan Jaak Peterson gathered his Estonian poems into two small books but never saw them published, as this only occurred a hundred years after his death. Three German poems were published posthumously in 1823. One of Peterson’s projects was fulfilled in his lifetime, the German version of Kristfrid Ganander's Mythologia Fennica, a dictionary of Finnish mythological words and names (the Swedish language original was published in 1789). Peterson's translation of Ganander's dictionary found many readers in Estonia and abroad, becoming an important source of national ideology and inspiration for early Estonian literature. Its dominating influence extended through the first decades of the 20th century.

By nature, Peterson imitated the lifestyle of the Greek cynics and dressed extravagantly, including elements of Estonian traditional clothing (a characteristic long black coat) in his dress. Being exceptionally talented in linguistic subjects, he quickly obtained knowledge of several languages, both ancient and modern, wrote philological treatises and made an attempt to compose a Swedish grammar. In modern days, Peterson's linguistic manuscripts, together with the original versions of his poems and diary, were published in 2001 in an Estonian-German bilingual edition, which included some new translations.
