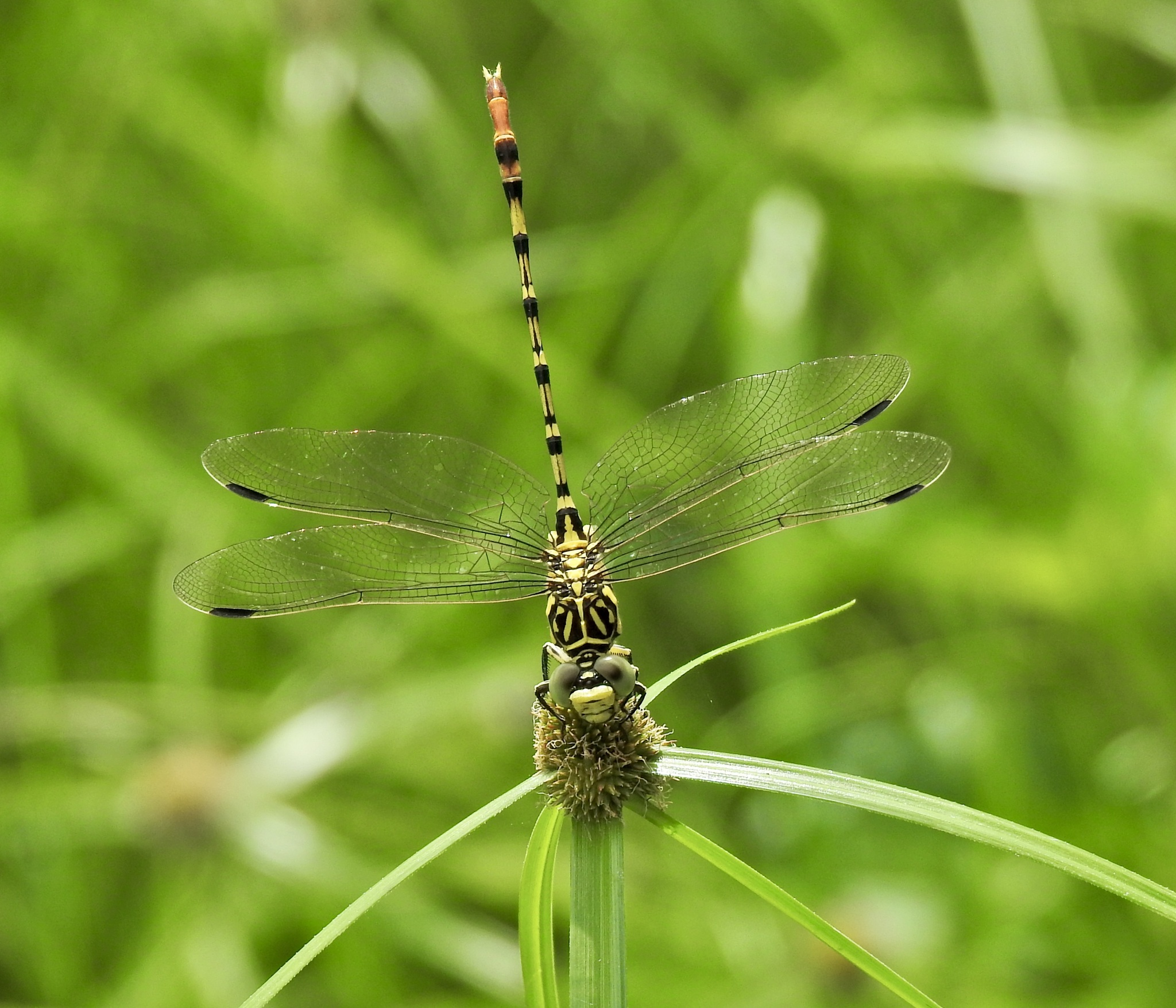
- Male, Palm Cove, Cairns

Conservation status
- Least Concern (IUCN 3.1)

Scientific classification
- Kingdom: Animalia
- Phylum: Arthropoda
- Clade: Pancrustacea
- Class: Insecta
- Order: Odonata
- Suborder: Anisoptera
- Family: Gomphidae
- Genus: Antipodogomphus
- Species: A. neophytus

Binomial name
- Antipodogomphus neophytus Fraser, 1958

= Antipodogomphus neophytus =

Northern dragon

Species of dragonfly

Antipodogomphus neophytus is a species of dragonfly of the family Gomphidae, known as the northern dragon. It is endemic to northern Australia, where it inhabits rivers and pools.

Antipodogomphus neophytus is a small to medium-sized black and yellow dragonfly with a long tail.

== Etymology ==
The genus name Antipodogomphus is derived from the Greek ἀντίποδες (antipodes, "those situated on the opposite side of the Earth"), combined with Gomphus, a genus name derived from the Greek γόμφος (gomphos, "peg" or "nail"), referring to the shape of the male abdomen. The name refers to the southern representative of that group.

The species name neophytus is derived from the Greek νεόφυτος (neophytos, "new convert" or "newly initiated"), referring to it being the third named species in the genus Antipodogomphus, after Antipodogomphus proselythus and Antipodogomphus acolythus.

== Gallery ==
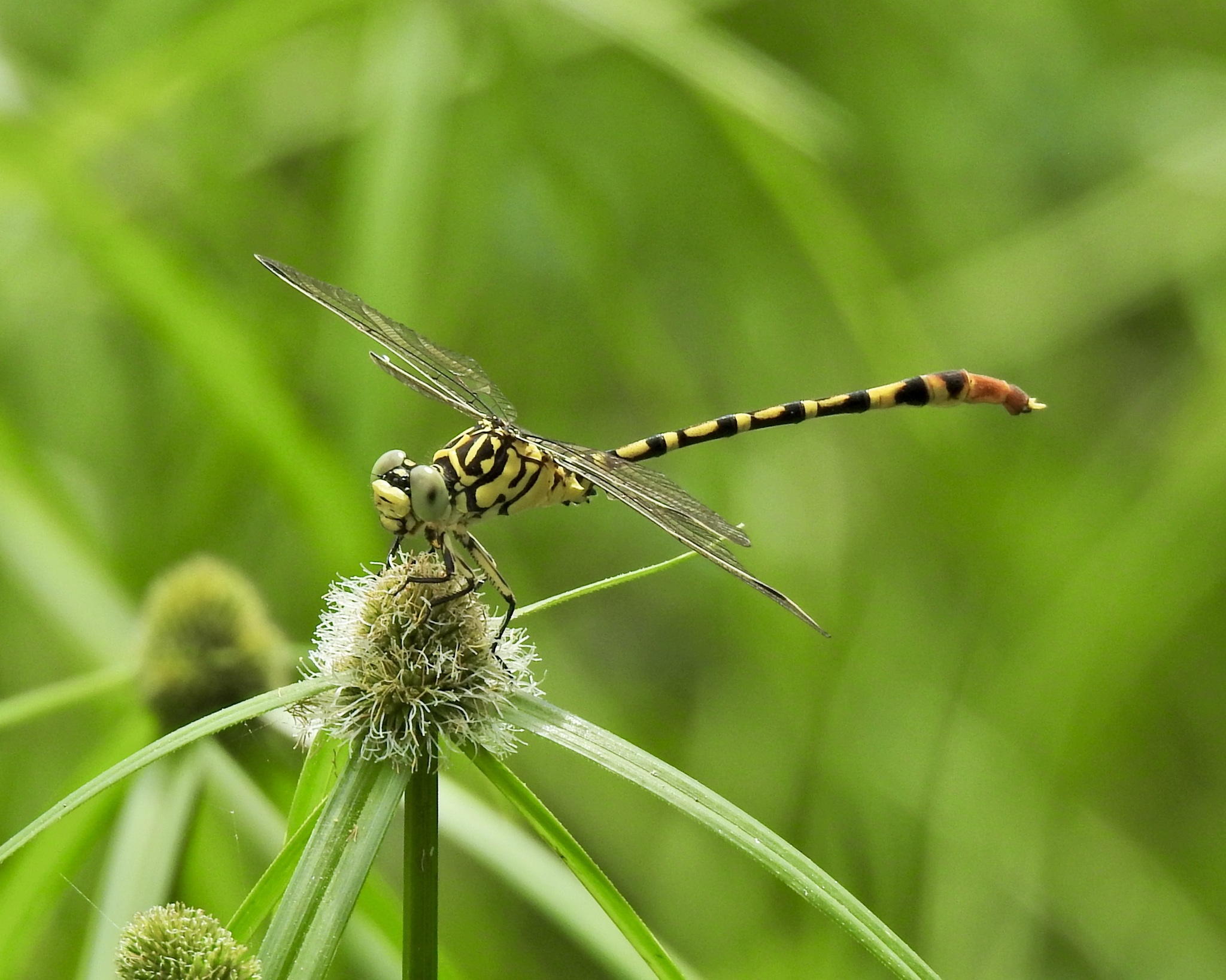
Palm Cove, Cairns

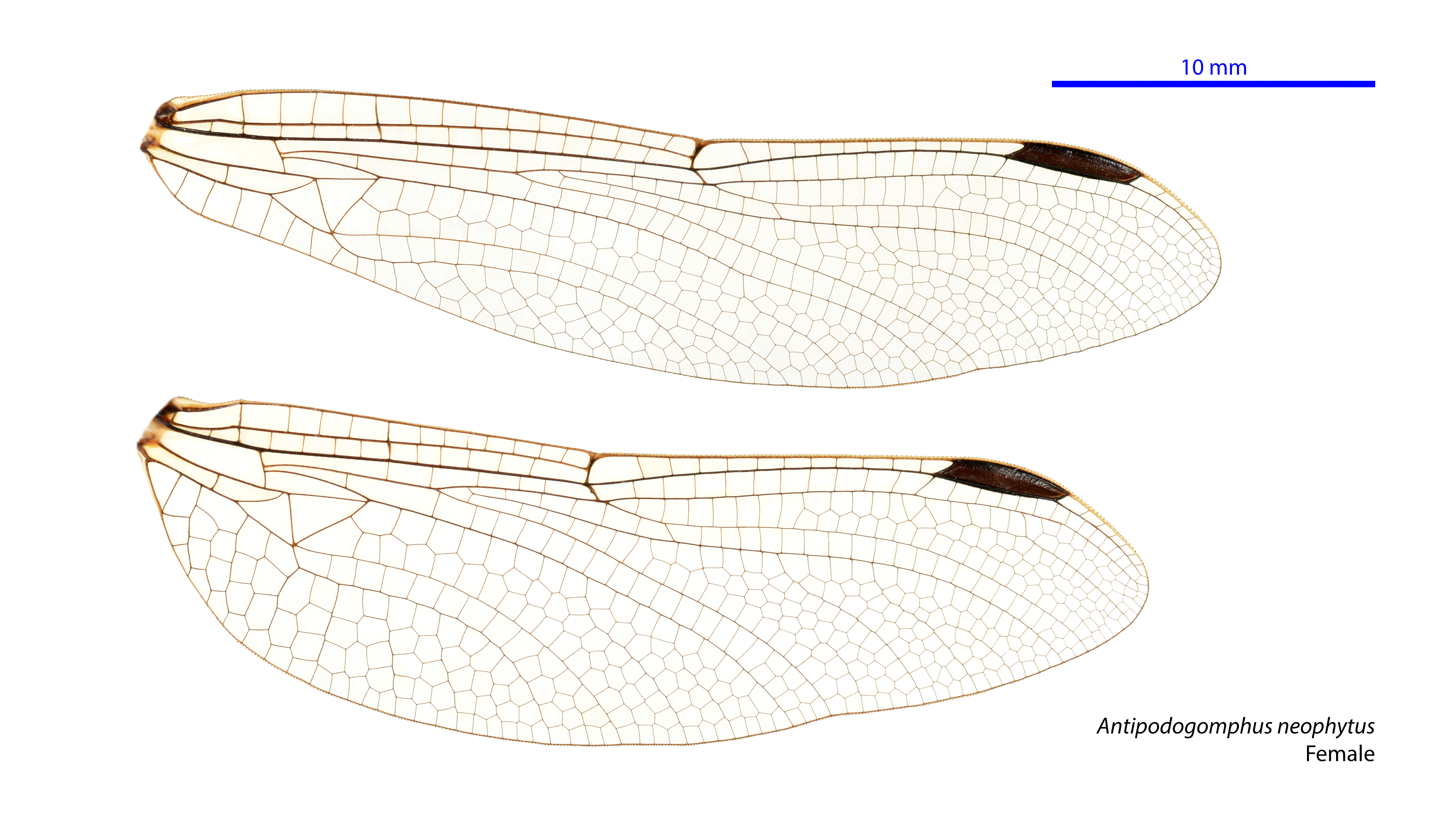
Female wings

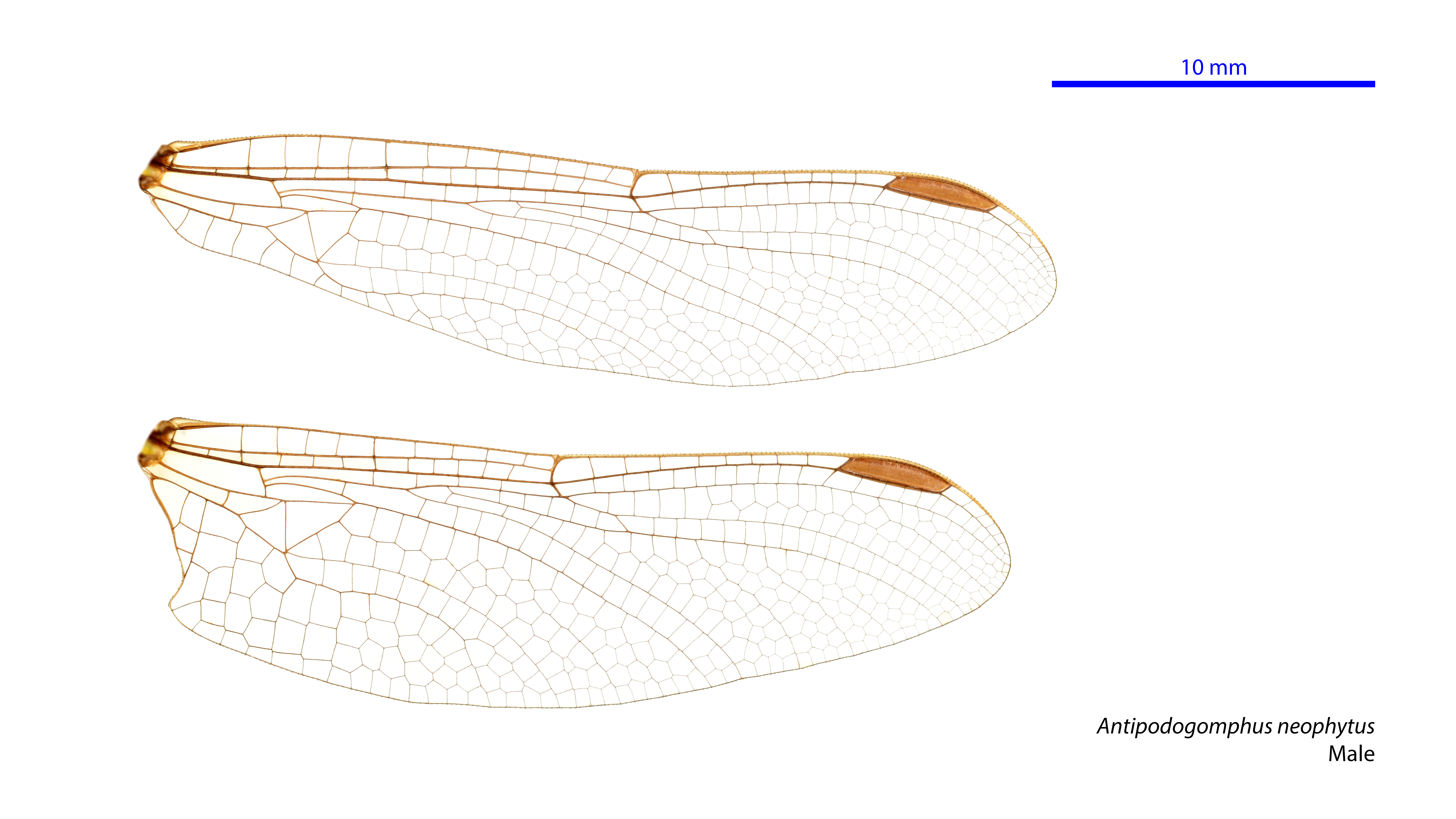
Male wings

== See also ==
- List of Odonata species of Australia
