= Saaremaa Waltz =

Estonian song

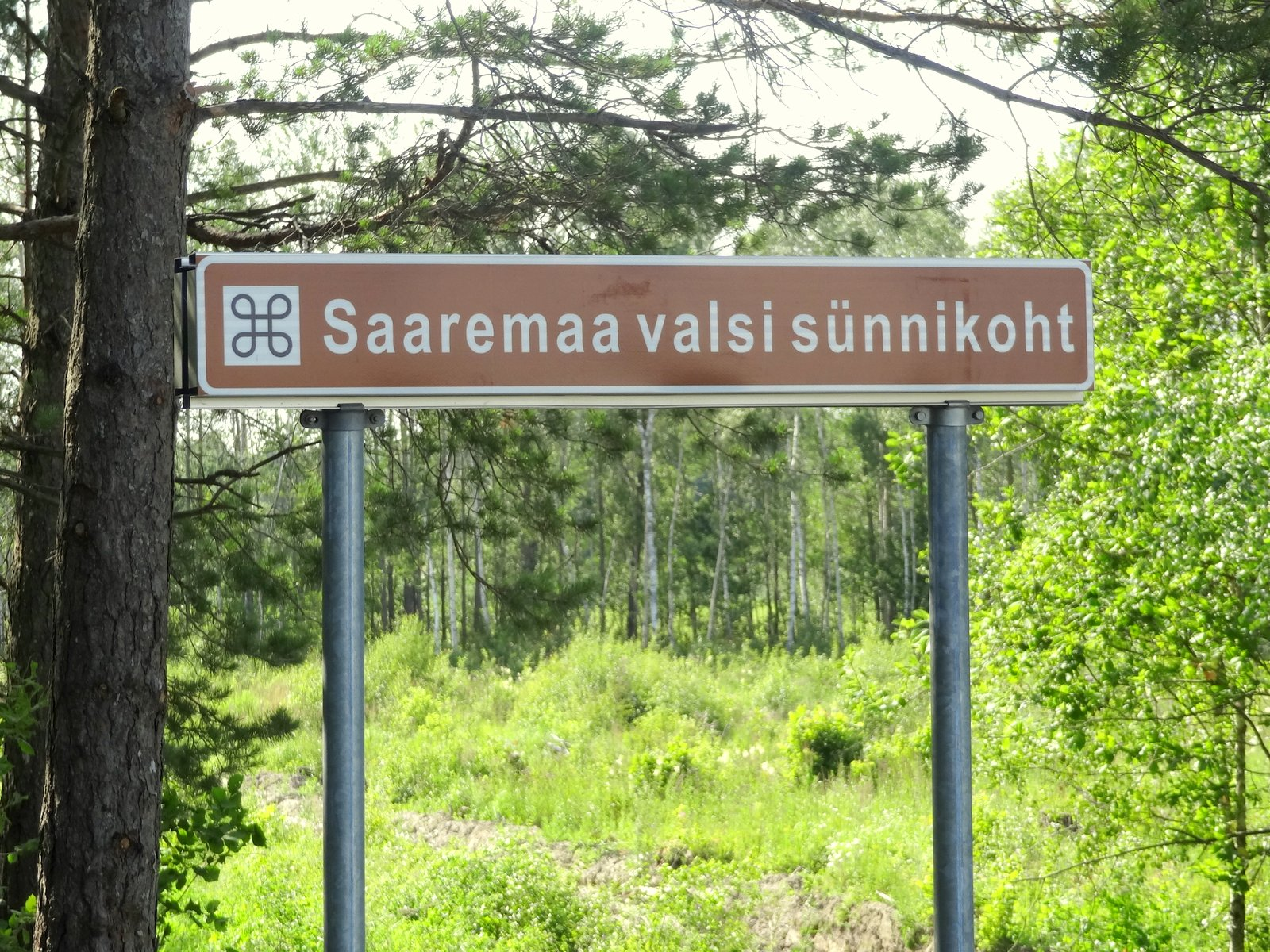
Road sign "Birthplace of the Saaremaa Waltz"

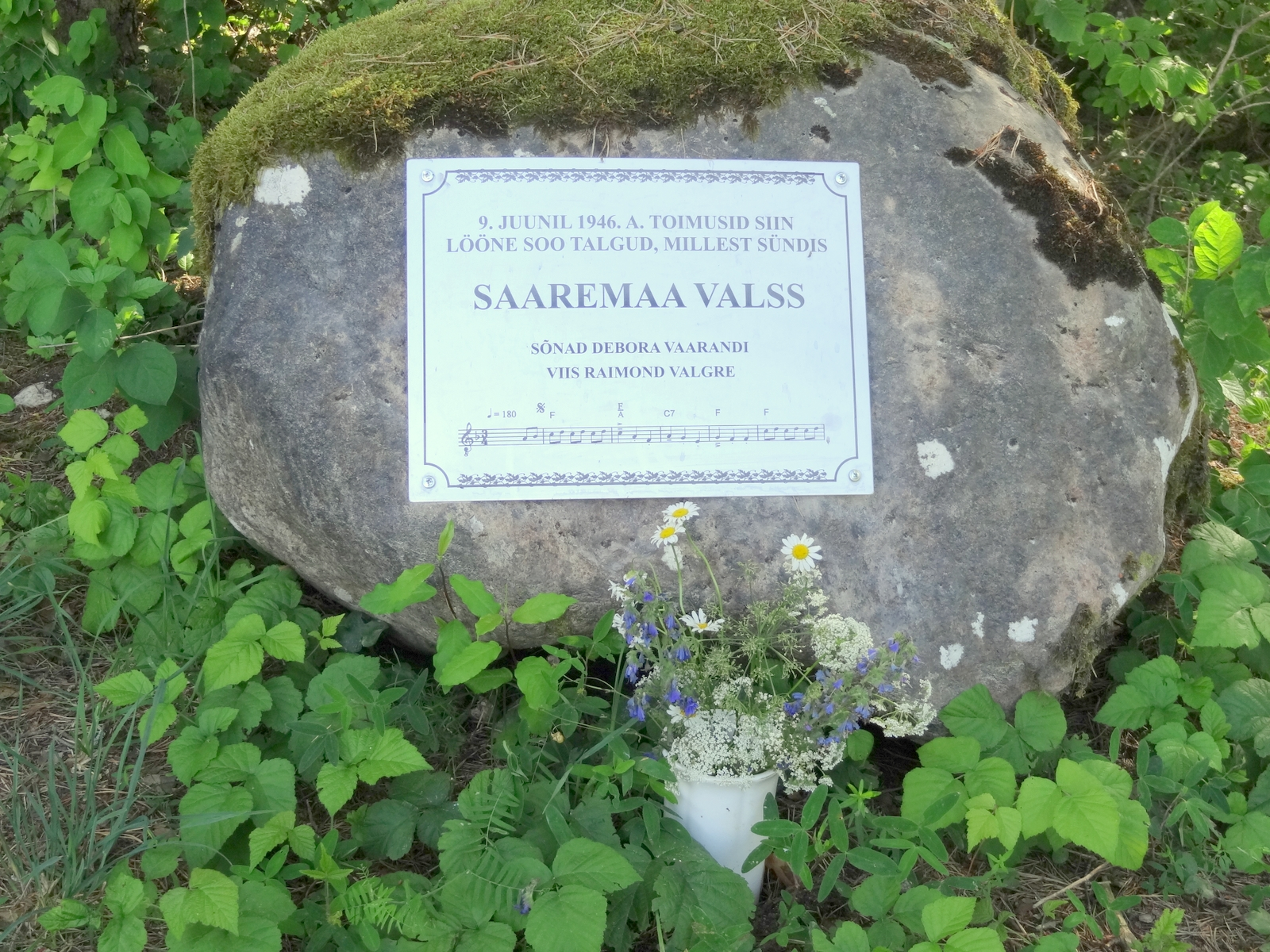
Memorial stone of the song

Saaremaa Waltz (Estonian: Saaremaa valss) is an Estonian song (schlager) written in 1949 by Raimond Valgre. The words of the song come from the poem Talgud Lööne soos by Debora Vaarandi.

Georg Ots recorded a version in 1950.

The song is popular also in Finland. The Finnish lyrics were written by Ilkka Kortesniemi.
