= Hiis =

- Commune
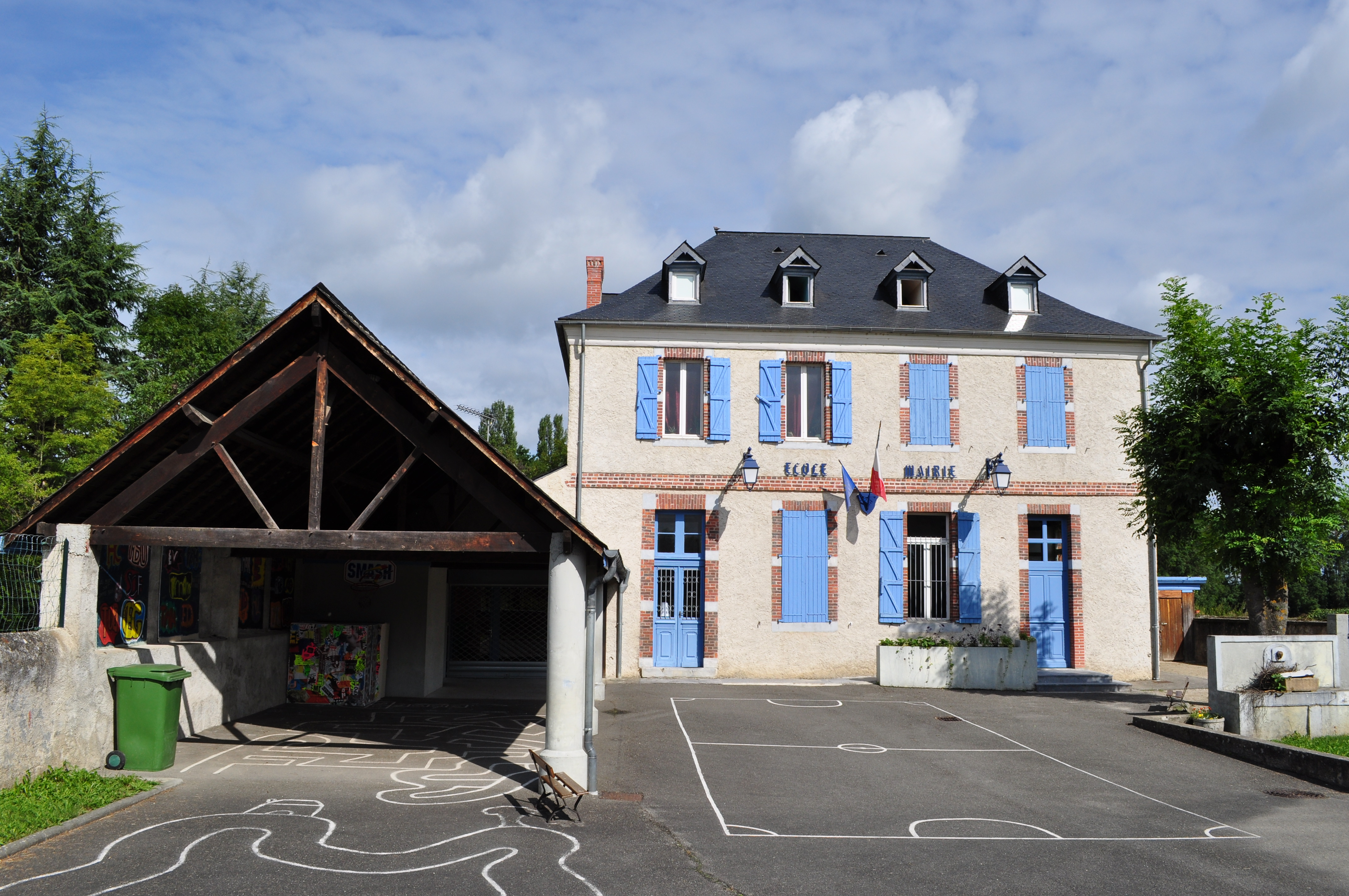
- The town hall of Hiis. The building also houses a school.

- Coat of arms
- Location of Hiis
- Location within France Location within Occitanie
- Coordinates: 43°08′13″N 0°06′15″E
- Country: France
- Region: Occitania
- Department: Hautes-Pyrénées
- Arrondissement: Bagnères-de-Bigorre
- Canton: La Haute-Bigorre
- Intercommunality: CC de la Haute-Bigorre

Government
  - Mayor (2020–2026): Yannick Le Cardinal
- Area^{1}: 3.03 km^{2} (1.17 sq mi)
- Elevation: 387 m (1,270 ft)
- Highest elevation: 579 m (1,900 ft)
- Lowest elevation: 409 m (1,342 ft)
- Population (2023): 268
  - Density: 88.4/km^{2} (229/sq mi)
- Time zone: UTC+01:00 (CET)
  - Summer (DST): UTC+02:00 (CEST)
- INSEE/Postal code: 65221 /65200
- ^{1} French Land Register data, which excludes lakes, ponds, glaciers > 1 km^{2} (0.386 sq mi or 247 acres) and river estuaries.

Hiis (French pronunciation: [is]; Occitan: Hins) is a commune in the Hautes-Pyrénées department in south-western France.

== See also ==
- Communes of the Hautes-Pyrénées department
