= Estonian Folklore Archives =

Archive in Tartu, Estonia; unit of Estonian Literary Museum

- Estonian Folklore Archives (subdivision of the Estonian Literary Museum)
- 58°22′26.2884″N 26°43′3.6948″E
- Location: Tartu, Estonia
- Established: 24 September 1927; 99 years ago

Collection
- Size: 31 folklore collections in manuscript to a total of ca 1,500,000 pages, a photo collection of ca 62,000 photographs, sound archive including more than 188,000 pieces, and 1,700 video tapes and films

Other information
- Director: Risto Järv
- Website: folklore.ee/era/ava.htm

The Estonian Folklore Archives (EFA) is the central folklore archives in Estonia. The Archives functions currently as the subdivision of the Estonian Literary Museum but it was established in 1927 as the division of the Estonian National Museum. The current Head of the Archives is Dr. Risto Järv.

== History ==
Established in 1927, the Estonian Folklore Archives was made the central folklore archive and research institution of Estonia. Located in Tartu, the main purpose of the archives was to bring together all the previous existing collections to facilitate research, to start research in a broad scope and to organize fieldwork in Estonia.

=== Foundation and early years ===
The original collections of the archives were based on manuscript reports and accounts of Estonian folklore gathered together by Estonian folklore collector Jakob Hurt (1839–1907). Estonian folklore had been previously collected by Baltic Germans, as a literary hobby or amateur linguistic activity. Jakob Hurt brought together different initiatives and encouraged people in Estonia to collect folklore. Collecting their own folklore and creating their own history through folklore collections supported the national awakening. Work of Jakob Hurt resulted in a manuscript collection of 114 696 pages containing songs, proverbs, riddles, legends, folk tales and other folklore materials from various regions of Estonia, sent by more than 1400 collectors. Hurt systematized manuscripts and arranged the collected material into volumes by format and place of collection. After the death of Hurt his collection was transferred to the repository of the Finnish Literature Society in Helsinki as by that time there was no appropriate preservation condition in Estonia for such a material. Finnish folklorist Kaarle Krohn (1863–1933) was the initiator of the move.

Discussions about the return of J. Hurt's collections were started in 1924 with an idea of founding folklore archives in Estonia. Estonian folklorist Oskar Loorits (1900–1961) was one of the scholars standing behind this idea. Estonian archive was based on the example of the Finnish Literature Society and inspired by the Archives of Latvian Folklore which was founded in 1924 as the first of its kind in the region. On September 24, 1927, the Estonian Folklore Archives was formed as an independent subdivision of the Estonian National Museum, and it was headed by Oskar Loorits. The archivists concentrated on the processing of previously collected materials, making them available for research, and started to collect folklore and compile publications. Collections of the Archives grew considerably during the 13 years before the Soviet occupation. In addition to the manuscripts, the collections of sound recordings and photographs were established. The geographic distribution of the collected folklore materials was taken into consideration – the aim was to complement previous collection work. Archives begun to document the folklore of minority groups in Estonia as well as of kindred Finno-Ugric peoples, broadening the area of the collections.

=== Second World War ===
In 1940 the Estonian Folklore Archives were reorganized into the Department of Folklore of the State Literary Museum. During the Nazi German occupation (1941–1944) reorganization happened again. The Folklore Department with its collections became part of the University of Tartu, and the State Literary Museum ceased to exist. Oskar Loorits was removed from the position of the director of the Archives. In 1943 in order to save collections from destruction, they were evacuated to different places all over Estonia. The Soviet Union occupied again Estonia in 1944 thus the Folklore Department belonged once again to the State Literary Museum, and collections were brought back to their former depositories. The revisions and censorships of the collections were superficial during the first part of the Soviet occupation (1940–1941), but this changed during the period that followed after 1945, when the Soviet repressions became evident.

=== Period of Soviet occupation ===
In the year 1944 Estonia was deliberated from Nazis by Soviet Army. However, in reality it was only about replacing one occupier by another. Soviets incorporated Estonia into Soviet Union and established Estonian SSR which remained until the collapse of USSR in 1991. Soviet occupation influenced all levels of political, social and cultural life in the country. The Estonian Folklore Archives – renamed at that period as the Folklore Department of the State Literary Museum – were not exception. Under the rule of Soviet ideology some significant changes took place. The approach towards folklore, the dynamics of collecting and archival practices where adjusted to fit the Soviet ideology. In addition, some of the archivists were repressed in the end of the 1940s.

The Soviet approach towards folklore and national identities was in some way contradictory; on the one hand it repressed nationalism but on the other hand it supported significantly national cultures of particular Soviet Socialist Republic claiming the right for national and cultural autonomy of every republic. It was for example visibly seen in increasing numbers of various folklore ensembles, in borrowing folk motives in official art and state propaganda, in maintaining folk traditions etc. Together with that the study of folklore was supported however only in ways which fitted the regime. Generally speaking emphasize was placed on working class and lower social strata while topics like religion and beliefs were omitted. During the Stalinist era, the concept of Soviet folklore was exalted. Instead of depicting the Finnic, Scandinavian, Germanic or Baltic influences, the impact of Russian tradition was emphazised. Praise to the new social order and Soviet leaders was made, while the figures of bourgeois Estonians and German landlords were allowed to be satirized. Themes that reinforced Soviet rhetoric, such as heroic epics, were promoted consolidating a one-sided construction of history. Themes such as the struggle of social class depicted from the perspective of the working masses or life in collective farms were imposed as a reference to the modern thinking that promulgated the regime.

Together with the new regime the deep re-evaluating of collections occurred. For example, Jakob Hurt was proclaimed a bourgeois researcher and the founder of archives Oskar Loorits was regarded as worthless and his name was erased from indexes and he was rarely mentioned in any new scholar works and publications. All of the existing collections were censored between 1945 and 1952, and the manuscript volumes were checked page by page. The methods of censorship included cut-outs, black ink, glue and ripping pages out from the volumes. Most of this work was carried out by folklorists themselves and censoring was part of the working plans of the staff of the Folklore Department. Some volumes were controlled by people from the Central State Archives and there, censorship had been stricter.

Most of the censored materials consisted of songs and jokes of the genres that reflected the contemporary society most clearly. During the 1940s and 1950s anti-Soviet folklore that was hostile or ironic towards Soviet ideas was cut out or covered by ink. Similarly obscene folklore as blue jokes, raunchy songs, riddles or sayings was censored. Also the principles of copying and indexing were affected by dominant state ideology. For example, above mentioned Oskar Loorits, was erased from indexes and thus finding his materials was very complicated. New and detailed indexes were made about topics such as class struggles and historical events such as Great Patriotic War while other topics (for example Estonian Republic) were omitted. This indexing significantly hindered the possibility to find in the archives anything out of official stream. In the 1960s, after the so-called period of ‘Khrushchev's Thaw’, separated pages and documents of the Stalinist period were returned to the Folklore Department. Since the local KGB officers systematically monitored the content of the collections until the late 1980s, the material was kept in separate boxes to avoid complications.

During the Soviet period collective field trips of 10 to 15 professional folklorists were introduced. Up to the 1990s, expeditions to rural areas were of main interest and focus was mostly on archaic folklore. However, step by step folklorists returned to contemporary matters. During the last decade of the Soviet period childlore became a new research topic and a special collection RKM, KP. was created. By the fall of the Soviet Union in 1991, the interest in the origins and roots increased as well as the topic of folk beliefs became popular. The folklore archives recovered its old name.

=== Present days ===
After Estonian re-independence and institutional reorganization of the Estonian Folklore Archives in 1995, collections of the Department of Literature and Folklore at the University of Tartu and the Tallinn Institute of Language and Literature of the Estonian Academy of Sciences were incorporated into the Estonian Folklore Archives. Thus, by the year 2000, all of the larger folklore collections formerly held by different institutions had been concentrated within the Folklore Archives. Today, the archived material is primarily intended for researchers and students in the field of folklore studies. The archives’ employees offer assistance and consultations to ethnologists, cultural anthropologists, and researchers of other disciplines in Estonia and elsewhere in the world. In addition to such researchers, the target user group of the archives could consist more generally of everyone interested in Estonian folklore.

The research results of the archive's workers are published as articles and monographs, academic source publications are produced as well. In 2000 the Publication of the series Proceedings of the Estonian Folklore Archives (Eesti Rahvaluule Arhiivi Toimetused) was restored after the long break during the Soviet regime. The Archives is also responsible for preparing and publishing the collections of runic songs (such as Vana Kannel [“Old Harp”]) by parishes of Estonia and academic anthologies of folk tales in the edited series Monumenta Estoniae Antiquae.

Along with digital technologies's development in the 1990s the digital means helped in keeping of various registers, and in working with texts. Various digital registers and databases were created, the digitization projects were initiated and digital materials started increase in numbers. At the same time the formation of analogue registers and cardfiles ceased one by one. However, at the beginning of the 2000s somewhat chaotic situation had arisen – it was easier to work with computers, but there was no coherent system to manage and access the data in the archives.

The new, digital consolidation of the archival system was developed by the archives' team, bringing the functionality of registers and cardfiles into an archival information system. Later the idea of digital repository in order to store the voluminous digital collections was realized with the financial help of the Estonian Information System Authority (2010–2012). Emerged digital archive consisted of the repository module and the archival information module – for folklore archives as well as for the neighbouring archives in the Estonian Literary Museum. One of the outcomes of digital development was emergence of the Estonian Literary Museum's file repository called Kivike.

=== The Folklore Archives directors ===
- Oskar Loorits 1940–1942
- Gustav Ränk 1942–1944
- Richard Viidalepp 1944–1945
- Hilda Nõu 1950–1952
- Herbert Tampere 1952–1966
- Ottilie-Olga Kõiva 1966–1977
- Ellen Liiv 1977–1988
- Urmas Oras 1988–1990
- Janika Oras 1990–1991
- Anu Korb 1991–1998
- Ergo-Hart Västrik 1999–2008
- Risto Järv 2009-

== Collections ==
Collections of the Estonian Folklore Archives consist of sub-archives of manuscripts, photographs, sound recordings, films and videos, as well as of multimedia content.

=== Manuscripts ===
The EFA contains 31 collections of manuscripts, which is overall up to 1.5 million pages. The most essential period of collecting folklore in manuscript format is related to the activities of Jakob Hurt (1838–1907) and Matthias Johann Eisen (1880–1934). J. Hurt started to collect folklore in the 1860s, his collection finally reaching 162 volumes of manuscripts, now one of the most priceless parts of the EFA (all 114,696 manuscript pages of this collection are available as scans through the digital file repository of the Estonian Literary Museum http://kivike.kirmus.ee/). Moreover, Oskar Kallas (1868–1946) also played an important role in collecting Estonian folklore. He organised the campaign of collecting Estonian folk melodies in a systematic and scientific way between 1904 and 1916 in association with the Estonian Students’ Society. This collection contains a total of 13,139 folk songs together with their melodies.

Each manuscript collection's name is provided with an abbreviation in accordance with the person's name who gathered it. For instance, E refers to the collection of M. J. Eisen, and H indicates the manuscript collection of J. Hurt. Some of the collections are also divided into series named after format of the manuscript, such as H I, H II, and H III according to the size of the manuscript pages. Since 2000 also digitised manuscripts have been archived.

=== Photographs ===
Among the sub-archives of the EFA there is a large collection of photographs. This was one of the EFA's earliest collections. The earliest photographs are glass plate negatives; these, however, went out of use in the first half of the twentieth century. Altogether in 2016 the collection included 17,993 black-and-white photographs, 8,075 colour photographs and 33,137 digital photographs which is the fastest growing type of photographs in the archives since then. Partly the photograph collections have been digitalised and made available at the digital file repository of the Estonian Literary Museum http://kivike.kirmus.ee/. The photograph collection also contains photographs depicting material and landscapes related to folk tradition. In the beginning of the 2000s the process of digitalization of analogous collections had been undertaken with all the collections, including the digitalization of photographs. The copies were prepared and preserved so that these would serve as security copies of analogous materials.

=== Sound recordings ===
The collection includes material on phonograph records, audio tapes, and cassettes. The first recordings, which were on wax cylinders, were made between 1912 and 1914 by the Finnish folklorist A. O. Väisänen (1890–1969). The main data carriers are DATs and Mini discs which have been used since 1995 and memory cards since the beginning of 2000. From 1992 Jaan Tamm – a sound engineer in the Estonian Folklore Archives – worked on digitalizing the earlier tape recordings. Older collections of sound recordings contain recordings of instrumental music performed on older instruments. In the 20th century, sound recordings mostly contain folksongs in newer styles. In the era of digitalization, the sound recordings were digitized in order to preserve them.

=== Films and videos ===
There are 1,377 items in the film and video collection, comprising film strips, videotapes from the 1980s, digital material on Mini DV and memory cards. These data carriers reflect the traditions of Estonians and other ethnic groups. For instance, the video collection consists of recordings of music performances taken both in authentic performance situations and at folk music festivals. Together this collection has 6 series. For example, analogue video recordings, digital tapes, digitally born recordings as files, etc.

=== Multimedia ===
In 2008 the multimedia collection was established. This includes digital material such as emails and Powerpoint presentations that do not fit into any of the other categories.

== Collections of ethnic minorities ==
In the 19th century folklore collecting of ethnic minorities – non-Estonian Finno-Ugric peoples, Baltic Germans, Russians, Swedes, Jews, Romani people – was rather scant because of lack of interest and linguistic competence of the collectors who were mostly amateurs. The situation with Finno-Ugric folklore was approximately the same in that period as the feeling of kinship encompassed mostly with Finns.

The situation changed in independent Estonia. In EFA, there appeared separate series of national minority collection (such as ERA, Vene – Russian collection; ERA, Saksa – Baltic German collection; ERA, Rootsi – Estonian Swedish collection, etc.). Folklorists of that time made systematic and thorough collection of ethnic minorities. Before the Second World War, Estonians accounted for 90% of population. Still Russians, Swedes, Baltic-Germans and Jews were granted for cultural autonomy. Besides, here lived Ingrian Finns, Izhorians, Latvians, Tartars, Romani people and others.

During the Second World War, folklore collecting stopped. After the war the work started again (under Soviet Government) but it differed compared to the prewar period. Germans and Swedes mostly had fled from the country. The Jews and Romani people were nearly all murdered during the German occupation. Russian minority changed its structure. At the same time there appeared Belarusian and Polish folklore collections. After re-establishing independence in Estonia work on minority collections continued.

=== Non-Estonian Finno-Ugric collections ===
The Finno-Ugrian linguistic relatives of the Estonians were initially documented by Finnish researchers who were further along in folklore collecting. This may be surprising considering the relatively easy access Estonia had to eastern Finno-Ugric peoples as part of the Russian Empire. This lack of documentation by Estonian scholars was due to insufficient academic preparation and the high cost of fieldwork particularly among the more distant Finno-Ugric peoples. Exception in this respect was activities of Mihkel Veske, lecturer of Finno-Ugric languages at Kazan University, who conducted research on Mari and Mordvin languages in the years following 1886. However, although he amassed an extensive collection of Estonian folklore, which is housed at the Estonian Folklore Archives (EFA), Veske did not expand his scope to include the folklore of Volga Finns in Kazan.

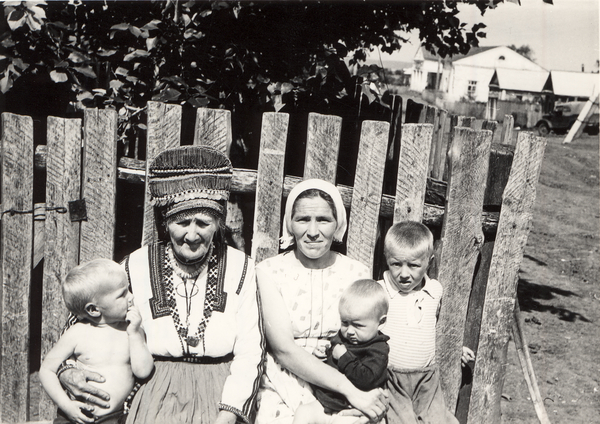
Ersa-Mordvinian Tatiana Danilova with her grandchildren – Viktor Danilov (1974)

During the Soviet period a separate series RKM, Soome-ugri was established for the materials of Finno-Ugric peoples. This series is made up of six volumes of around 3000 pages containing materials collected from a variety of Finno-Ugric peoples. In the sound collections of the EFA one can find also a considerable number of tape recordings of Mordvin folklore, made by Mikhail Tshuvashov and Viktor Danilov.

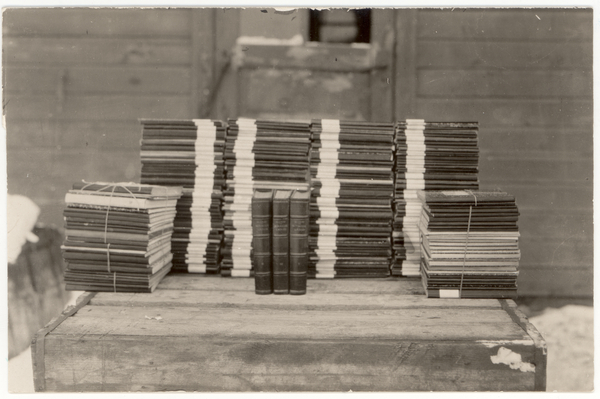
Old Setu collection, 1932

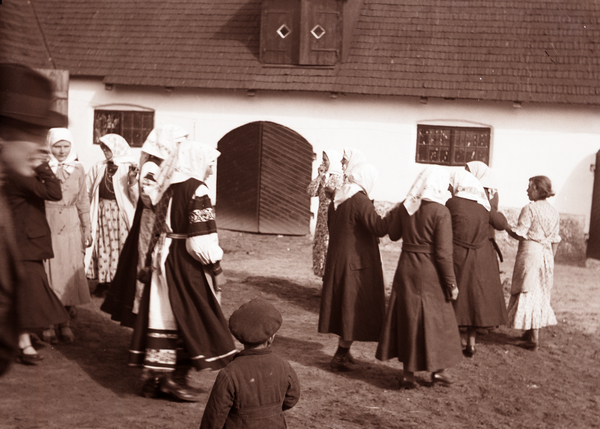
Krakovjak Seto, 1936 f315

=== Baltic Finnic folklore ===
The collecting campaign launched by Jakob Hurt including field research in Seto region was recognized by the Russian Geographical Society which subsidized his expeditions. In the 1920s and 1930s minor collection series ERA, Ingeri was initiated for the folklore of Ingrian Finns and Izhorians. The series for the folklore of Votians ERA, Vadja was initiated by Paul Ariste.

Baltic Finnic is also presented by Finns (ERA, Soomi) and Livs. The Livonian collection (ERA, LF) has a fate on its own. Livonian materials were collected as a result of interest of Oskar Loorits. This large collection covers all folklore genres, but it represents folk beliefs at its best and includes linguistic (mostly lexical) data. When Loorits fled from Tartu to Sweden in 1944, he took Livonian collection with him. After his death, materials ended in Finnish Literary Society in Helsinki, exactly as it happened to Jakob Hurt's archive half a century before, and just as in case of Hurt, Loorits' materials returned to Estonia a while after the restoration of Republic's independence, in 1998.

=== Russian folklore collection ===
The biggest Russian folklore collection of the pre-WW2 period in the Estonian Folklore Archives is labeled as ERA, Vene. The head of Estonian Folklore Archives Dr. Oskar Loorits stated that Russian collection would provide important materials to do comparative studies with Estonian folklore. ERA, Vene collection has 10,656 pages which is divided into 17 volumes. Most of the materials were collected from the north-eastern and south-eastern part of Estonia. This collection was contributed as a part of voluntary work. Estonian volunteers were from the educational field while the Russian volunteers were from the intellectual background. The scholar students collected folklore from the Petseri district, and also regions by the river Narva and Lake Peipsi. To organise the collected materials, it was divided according to the language. In some cases, this classification occurred according to the ethnic identity.

Professor, academician, and employee of the Estonian Folklore Archives Paul Ariste also contributed by collecting folklore materials of the Old Believers from the coast of Lake Peipsi. He arranged collecting campaign in various Russian schools and also recorded the performance situations in Russian language. Another archive employee who collected Russian folklore in a larger amount was Menda Ehrenberg. Later in the post-war period, one of the creative student collector Vera Voogla collected Russian folklore and deposited it in a separate archive that belonged to the University of Tartu. The collection was later redeposited to as series RKM, Vene.

=== Belarusian folklore collection ===
The Belarusian collection (ERA, Valgevene) contains 46 pages of manuscripts found by Paul Ariste in the abandoned flat of his teacher Peeter Arumaa, a Slavist scholar, who fled to the West during the WWII. These materials include self-records of Belarusian prisoner Ivan Kachur (Іван Качур) who wrote down tales and legends he heard from his grandparents, and materials evidently copied by Arumaa from printed sources. The whole collection is available in the digital repository Kivike.

=== Baltic-German folklore collection ===
Prior to the establishment of the Estonian Folklore Archives in 1927, Baltic Germans were the largest group of Estophiles to contribute to the folklore collection. Two cultural associations co-ordinated their efforts: the Gelehrte Estnische Gesellschaft (GEG), established in Tartu in 1838 and the Estnische Literarische Gesellschaft, established in Tallinn in 1842.

Most Baltic German folklore material was collected randomly with the exception of the collection of the Learned Estonian Society. The collection is divided into materials collected in German (GEG, DH) and Estonian (GEG, EH). Even after Estonia gained independence in 1918, most members of the GEG were of German origin and remained so well into the early 1920s. Walter Anderson, a folklore professor at the University of Tartu, compiled about 2,500 pages of German folklore in five files in a series called ÕES, Anderson.

After the founding of the Estonian Folklore Archives, new collections were supplemented by a designation ERA. The German collection is called ERA, Saksa which contains three volumes of about 1,200 pages. Partly these materials have been published as an e-publication titled Und Vater und Mutter und Lust und Leben.

Although a substantial part of the foreign materials collected, the archived materials regarding Baltic Germans is relatively small, partly because early calls for folklore were done so in Estonian. Also because many of those collecting folklore did not have the language skills necessary to document Baltic German folklore and those who did have the skills felt it was unimportant. Further collection was also impeded by the Second World War as the Baltic Germans left Estonia after the Molotov–Ribbentrop pact was signed in 1939.

=== Swedish folklore collection ===
In the 13th and 14th centuries Swedes settled in the Western coastal regions of Estonia. Swedes had a social status similar to Estonians and it was less likely that their folklore would be documented due to inadequate knowledge of languages. This was during the first period of collection of folklore within Estonia initiated by Estophiles 1838. During the 18th century many Swedes were displaced by Russian authorities and relocated to Ukraine, where they established the community of Gammalsvenskby, but others may have been assimilated into Estonia. Data from the period of the independent Estonian Republic reflects that they represented 1% of the population. There are two files or approximately one thousand pages containing Swedish material in ERA, Rootsi. Data regarding these trends was collected primarily by Paul Ariste who focused his studies on Estonian and Swedish linguistic relations. In 1927 Ariste visited Estonian Swedes for the first time for the purpose of research and folkloric documentation with an emphasis on linguistic data, such as language of communication used among families within specific villages. Estonian Swedish folklore was also documented by Oskar Loorits.

=== Jewish folklore collection ===
Jewish communities were predominantly in urban centres. Jews and Swedes were granted cultural autonomy by the state along with Germans and Russians. Started in 1927, to 1930 the Jewish collection gathered already 385 pages. To 1940 the main part of collection was finished, several more items were recorded in 1946 and in 1960s and 1980s. Now the Estonian Folklore Archives contain 790 page with 1430 records of Jewish folklore in the ERA, Juudi collection. University students of Jewish backgrounds (Elias Levenberg, Isidor Levin, Berta Kaplan, Sara Vilenski) recorded most of the material along with Estonian folklorist Paul Ariste. The pupils of the Tartu Jewish school were encouraged to participate by their teachers of Sara Vilenski and Elias Levenberg, a former student of University Judaic studies. Tartu University folklore professor Walter Anderson supervised a portion of the collection process, produced by students. Some of these materials were published in Ariste's article "Some Yiddish folksongs in Estonian song-repertoire" (1932). Jewish folklore was also documented from pupils in nearby Daugavpils Latvia by Isidor Levin.

The Jewish folklore collections are now digitised (ERA Juudi 1, ERA Juudi 2) and available online. The description of the collections is given on the web in The Tartu Jewish Folklore Collection: 1926-1938, 1946.

=== Romani folklore collection ===
The collection of Romani folklore are contained under the heading ERA, Mustlased and include 250 pages. Romani people lived in Southern Estonia near the Latvian border along with Tartars and Latvians who also resided in this region. Folklorist Paul Ariste and musicologist K. Leichter made phonograph recordings and Ariste published a collection of Romani tales along with a number of essays addressing traditional culture. Paulopriit Voolaine documented a couple hundred pages on Romani folklore collected in Russian and later recorded in Estonian. This collection is under the heading of Ludza-files of the main ERA collections as his ultimate goal was to make a comparative with Ludza Estonian folklore. Romani folklorist Medni Pilve recorded a considerable amount of material in the 1960s on tape.

=== Latvian folklore collection ===
The Latvian collection (ERA, Läti) counts approximately 1500 pages, earliest part of which was gathered in border region of Valga in the end of 19 cent. Further the collection was contributed by field records from Latvians of Estonia (Kaagvere region) and East Latvia, provided by volunteer Allina Verlis, folklorists Elmar Päss, Herbert Tampere, Isidor Levin and ubiquitous Paul Ariste. Materials of ERA, Läti, recorded by Alina Verlis from Valka are available in Latvian digital archive of folklore.

== Web-based databases of the Estonian Folklore Archives ==
With the start of the Digital Era in the mid-1990s, the Estonian Folklore Archives created the first digital registers and databases, which were intended to replace the analog index and card file system. Some archival materials received immediate digital counterparts and digital born materials were included in the collections. Currently, there are ca 30 thematic or genre based online databases, which focus on the materials, stored in the Estonian Folklore Archives.

=== Kivike ===
The File Repository and Archival Information System Kivike (an acronym of the phrase Kirjandusmuuuseumi Virtuaalne Kelder or the Virtual Cellar of the Literary Museum) is a project that was started in 2010. The aim of the File Repository is to preserve and increase accessibility of the collections of the Estonian Literary Museum and its departments (incl. the collections of the Estonian Folklore Archives), as well as to make archived materials available online for researchers and a wider audience.

In the beginning, Kivike was developed mostly with the support by the European Regional Development Fund which allowed to digitize a total of 240,000 pages of publications and archival material relevant to Estonian culture and make these materials accessible through the system. By 2012, the first collections were completely digitized including the Jakob Hurt folklore collection (H), the folklore collection of the Estonian Students’ Society (EÜS). Kivike is still a growing project which has developed and supported by a variety of foundations and projects. Kivike encompasses digitized analog archival material, manuscripts, and photographs as well as digital material sent to the archives and metadata about the material. It offers a general overview of all the reposited materials but also comprises specific genre-related databases for specialised research. Additionally, it is possible to search the materials by keywords compiled by the Estonian Folklore Archive.

=== The database of Estonian runic songs ===
The runic song (regilaul in Estonian) is an archaic folk song tradition that plays an important role in Estonian folklore. The collection of runic songs were part of Jakob Hurt's large-scale folklore collecting activities across Estonia. In 2003 the work with the database for runic songs was started by the Estonian Folklore Archives to facilitate the access to the archival material for researchers as well as the public. Its structure was organised parallel to pre-existing publications of some of the archival material, which were compiled after the original classification system based on Estonia's 101 parishes. The database was made available online in 2010 by the Archives’ folk song research group. It was developed with the help of the Finnish Literature Society following their example of runic song database SKVR.

Each song in the database is visible in the initial version and in a semi-edited version. The initial version includes the original historic spelling and the idiosyncratic features of the collectors. The edited versions are changed according to current orthographic rules to make the songs more accessible for non-specialists. They still include dialectal peculiarities and the collector's phrasing. By late 2016 the database contained 83,547 texts which are searchable by the parish, the collector and the time (of recording) as well as by class, function, type, and genre. The database has an English-language interface but all the materials are in Estonian.

=== The database of place-lore “Koobas” ===
Place-lore is an umbrella term for folklore focusing on place(name)s transmitted in prose. It includes (local) legends, beliefs, descriptions of customs, historical lore, and memoirs related to specific places. The structure refers hereby like the database of runic songs to the old parish system. Information on the current village, region, municipality or GPS-Coordinates can be found in the meta-data. Accompanying publications explain the location-specific features as well as its historical and social context.

The database was originally created for on-site use in 1998 and converted into a web-based database in 2012. In late 2016 the database contained 28,560 entries. The digital material is highly dependent on the interests in specific regions by the Archives’ place-lore research group. Although the database also includes recent fieldwork, most of the materials are subject to personal data protection restriction and therefore not publicly accessible. This database is also part of the cluster database of the Estonian Heritage Board, which compiles archeological and folklore-related information on places.

=== The database of children’s games “Uka Uka” ===
The database of children’ games is built on the basis of several campaigns for the collection of children's games and lore. Materials were collected in 1920–1930, 1934–1935, 1992, 2007 and 2013. The collection initiative in 2013 was conveyed into a web-based publication and inspired the creation of the online database.

The materials include game descriptions, playing situations, childhood memories connected with playing as well as starting rhymes. The contemporary entries additionally provide information regarding the context, time, place, gender, age and number of players as well as the region they were collected in and data on the collectors. The materials are searchable by name, game type or activity involved. In late 2016, the database contained 2,077 descriptions of games, some of which are accompanied by photos, figures or children's drawings.

=== The database of folktales ===
The database of folktales emerged in 1999 and was released to public use in 2016. It was created by researchers from the University of Tartu and the Estonian Folklore Archives. The database is structured in three main categories: tales, storytellers and collectors. There is also a literature database with information on printed publications in relation to the stored tales. The materials are equipped with metadata, such as archival references, names of the performers and those who recorded them, places and dates of the collection of the materials, and types of folktales according to Aarne–Thompson–Uther Index.

As for 2018, the database has 13,000 entries, but only small amount of texts have been made available online. Some materials are only accessible after being logged-in.

=== Databases compiled by the Department of Folkloristics ===
Materials of the Estonian Folklore Archives have been made accessible also via several other thematic databases compiled by the researchers of the Department of Folkloristics of the Estonian Literary Museum.

- Berta. Database of calendar holidays in Estonia with explanation on historical background, information on seasonal foods, customs, etc. Compiled by Mare Kõiva, Taive Särg and Liisa Vesik. Database is searchable by time markers (month/day), holidays, metadata, and other categories.
- Estonian acronyms. Compiled by Piret Voolaid. Contains over 3,000 short-cut puzzles focusing on acronyms that are searchable by question, answer, archive reference, collector, collection, place and time, or keyword.
- Estonian compound puns. Compiled by Piret Voolaid.
- Estonian conundrums. Compiled by Piret Voolaid. Contains over 25,000 conundrums that are searchable by question, answer, archive reference, collector, collection, or topography, collection time, or keyword.
- Estonian droodles. Compiled by Piret Voolaid. Database has Estonian and English versions. It has multiple search options that optimize filtering capabilities such as subject, question, answer, locality, archive reference, and date.
- Estonian mumming traditions. Compiled by Ülo Tedre. The database includes Ülo Tedre's in-depth analysis of Estonian older mumming traditions with maps and photos. The database section contains texts about mumming customs from the Estonian Folklore Archives.
- Estonian phraseologisms. Compiled by Anneli Baran, Anne Hussar, Asta Õim, Katre Õim. Contains about 160,000 phrases that are searchable by text, type, content, archive reference, location, collector, performer and collection time.
- Estonian proverbs. Compiled by Arvo Krikmann. Includes all types of Estonian proverbs. The search bar allows you to sort the results by type number, frequency, and keywords.
- Estonian proverbs with their literal translation in German. Compiled by Arvo Krikmann. 12,700 Estonian proverbs with translations into German. Searchable by keyword and type number. The interface in German; materials are in German and Estonian.
- Estonian riddles. Compiled by Jaak and Arvo Krikmann. Contains query options for 95,751 Estonian riddles (text, solution, place, time, collector, parish, etc.), tools for parsing and generating cartographic results, and various additional materials.
- Estonian verse riddles . Compiled by Piret Voolaid. Contains around 1,700 texts that are searchable by question, answer, archive reference, collector, collection, place and time, or keyword.
- Ethnoastronomy. Compiled by Aado Lintrop. Selection of belief accounts and custom descriptions in relation to celestial beings and the sky.
- Graffiti Database. Compiled by Piret Voolaid. One of the outputs of the collaboration between the Estonian Academy of Sciences and the Polish Academy of Sciences (Creativity and Tradition in Cultural Communication), which mainly consists of Tartu, but also parochial-phraseological graphite captured elsewhere.
- Herba. Herba is a database of ethnobotany. Compiled by Renata Sõukand and Raivo Kalle, it contains data from Archives' older manuscript collections. Texts are searchable by keywords and botanical features.
- LEPP, South Estonian Heritage Portal. Compiled by Mare Kõiva. Contains 10,000 folklore texts of the Estonian Folklore Archives, collected from Southern Estonia, mainly Võrumaa and Setumaa.
- Mythological diseases. Compiled by Mare Kõiva. Database focusing on belief accounts and narratives about mythological disease lendva. Searchable by keywords as well as a singular compiled list.
- Phraseologisms. Compiled by Arvo Krikmann. Contains approx. 25,400 Estonian phraseologisms derived from Asta Õim's Phraseological Dictionary, Estonian Folklore Archives’ manuscript collections and the Dialect Archives of the Estonian Language Institute.
- Rehepapp. Database of belief accounts and narratives. Compiled by Mare Kõiva, Mare Kalda et al. Contains legends, incantations and beliefs.
- Setu's tradition collected by Ello Kirs. Legends, fairy tales, beliefs, custom and other Setu traditions. Compiled by Kristi Salve.

== Research and development activities ==
While the importance of the primary role of the Estonian Folklore Archives as a physical repository of materials may have diminished, as many folklore databases are already available online, the EFA have maintained their central position largely because of specialised research. Continuing a long lasting tradition, there is still an endeavour to cover by and large all the subjects and genres of the materials in the Archives through the efforts of researchers and archivists competent within their field. Digital studio, as part of the Archives, supports digitisation of materials including video and audio records stored in the EFA as well as preparing audio and video material for publication. The research results of the Archive's workers are published mainly as articles and monographs, but academic source publications are also produced.

=== Research topics ===
Archives’ staff is currently doing research on various subjects, including such topics as ideologies and communities, runic songs, fairy tales, place lore, ethnomusicology, contemporary and children's folklore, and Estonians in Siberia. In recent years research on these topics has been funded through grants of the Estonian Research Council through the projects titled "Creation, Transmission and Interpretation of Folklore: Process and Institutions" (2003−2007), "Folklore and Folklore Collections in Cultural Changes: Ideologies, Adaptation and Application Context (2008−2013) and "Folklore in the Process of Cultural Communication: Ideologies and Communities (2014−2019).

In 2020, the EFA's institutional research theme switched to "Folklore and its individual, community and institutional transmission mechanisms." The project is aimed at examining folklore transmission practices in both a folk and institutional context; as well as factors such as historical context, social environment, community affiliation etc. that led to the folklore and value of certain information or, on the other hand, to the avoidance or silence. The project is divided into the following subtopics: analysis of archival text corpora; an individual-centered approach; a community-based approach; analysis of the relationship between man and nature / landscape; and a critical reflexive analysis of activities related to folklore collections.

The research will lead to results in scholarly and popular publications, open databases, and a modern science-based folklore archive functioning in the interests of society. The research is carried out by a team led by EFA senior researcher Mari Sarv.

==== Runic songs ====
EFA researchers work to understand poetics, pragmatics and linguistics of runic songs (regilaul). Their aim is to uncover the worldview these songs represent, the ways the songs were performed and collected as well as who were the singers. Researchers of the Archives contribute actively to the academic source publications on runic songs such as Vana Kannel (Old Harp) and participate in complementing the database of Estonian runic songs. By the year 2020, thirteen regional volumes of Vana Kannel have been published - these editions cover runic songs from the parished of Põlva, Kolga-Jaani, Kuusalu, Karksi, Mustjala, Haljala, Kihnu, Jõhvi, Iisaku, Lüganuse, Paide, Anna, Kodavere, and Laiuse. Folklorists of the Estonian Literary Museum are currently compiling editions of songs from Peetri and Kullamaa parishes.

Since 2000, the Archives has organised biennial runic song conferences that have been open to international communities of researchers in recent years. Papers of the conferences have been developed into collections of articles published in the Archives’ publication series Commentationes Archivi Traditionum Popularium Estoniae. A special issue of the journal Folklore: Electronic Journal of Folklore with a focus on Finnic runic song traditions, was published in 2014 after the conference on Regilaulu teisenemised ja piirid (Transformations and Borders of Regilaul).

Members of the runic songs research group are currently Andreas Kalkun, Helen Kõmmus, Aado Lintrop, Janika Oras, Ingrid Rüütel, Liina Saarlo, Mari Sarv and Taive Särg. Their research questions have concerned regional characteristics of runic songs including lexical and poetical devices, variety of discourses and ideologies reflected in songs, historical background of songs, relationships between runic songs and other folklore genres, stereotypes in songs, reflections of gender and singer's life in song texts, aspects of individual and collective creativity as well as the features used by particular singers.

Since 2000, the Estonian Science Foundation has funded a variety of research projects on Estonian runic songs. From 2000 to 2003, the language and poetics of runic songs were analyzed, with three Master's theses defended, and 33 scientific articles published. From 2005 to 2008, the ETF's grant project focused on the myths and ideologies of runic songs, with three doctoral theses defended.

==== Fairy tales ====
The fairy tales research group was established in 1999 at the Department of Estonian and Comparative Folklore, University of Tartu. Since 2010 the group has been hosted by the Estonian Folklore Archives. From the very beginning the research group has focused on fairy tales stored in the Estonian Folklore Archives. The work has been conducted in order to digitalize manuscripts and sound recordings from EFA's collections, to develop typology of Estonian fairy tales and to prepare publications of Estonian fairy tales as well as conduct relevant special research on the topic. The research group also develops database of folktales and organizes annual seminars on folktales.

==== Estonians in Siberia ====
The EFA's collection on Estonians in Siberia began with an expedition by Anu Korb and Astrid Tuisk in 1991 to the villages of Verkhnii Suetuk and Verkhnaia Bulanka in the Minusinsk area, Krasnoyarsk Territory, which was largely funded by the Estonian National Culture Foundation and the Cultural Endowment of Estonia. These were later expanded to further fieldwork in the Krasnoyarsk Territory in 1992, the Tomsk Region in 1993, the Kemerovo Region and the Tomsk Region in 1994, three expeditions to the Omsk Region in 1995, 1996, and 1997, respectively, the Novosibirsk Region in 1998, the Omsk region again in 1999 and 2000 (two expeditions), the Krasnoyarsk Territory and Altai Territory in 2000, and the Tomsk Region in 2004, with the help of funding from the Compatriots and “Estonian Language and Cultural Memory”, a national program. Since 1991, fourteen people, in all, participated in the fieldwork in Siberia: Anu Korb (11 times), Astrid Tuisk (8 times), Ell Vahtramäe (3 times), Aivar Jürgenson (2 times), Andres Korjus (2 times), Kadri Peebo (Tamm) (2 times), Villi Sulger (2 times), Risto Järv (1 time), Indrek Kaimer (1 time), Aado Lintrop (1 time), Pille Niin (1 time), Mari-Ann Remmel (1 time), Mari Sarv (1 time), and Ain Urbel (1 time).

Seen as a rescue collection to preserve folklore in danger of being lost, the collectors amassed files of songs, beliefs and descriptions of customs, folk tales, and firsthand accounts of daily life. In total, by the year 2014 the collection on Estonians in Siberia holds (all numbers approximated) 8,900 pages of handwritten material, 370 hours of audio recordings, 90 hours of video recordings, and 2,200 photographs.

==== Youth-centered contemporary folklore ====
Young people's and children's activities in daily life became a significant topic for contemporary folklore studies. As a result of large-scale political and social changes, children folklore started to change rapidly in Estonia since the beginning of the 1990s. Therefore, the Estonian Folklore Archives, in cooperation with the Department of Folkloristics of the Estonian Literary Museum, started to focus on gathering and analyzing these changes. In the light of this idea, in 1992 and 2007, there were nationwide competitions for schools about children games. For the first time in 2010, data from kindergartens were collected. Thousands of pages and tens of hours of audio and video recordings of folklore data from young people like graffiti, puzzles, proverbs, phrases, traditional tales, customs, games, and more are collected. In these surveys, the background, the impact of globalization, internet culture and the local traditions themselves formed the contemporary approach. Studies in contemporary folklore are published in the series "Contemporary folklore" published by the Department of Folkloristics of the Estonian Literary Museum.

==== Local traditions and place-lore ====
There are tens of thousands of texts in the Estonian Folklore Archives that mediate place-related stories and knowledge, collectively referred to as place-lore. Local tradition was actively collected during the Soviet era, both during the expeditions of the Folklore Department of the State Literary Museum as well as with the help of department's volunteer correspondents. A new interest in place-lore arose in the 1990s and then more and more personal memories about the individual landscape, a person's individual relationship with the landscape, were documented.

Systematised textual material on place-lore may be found in EFA card files based on the following classification:

- Local legends (trees, rocks, mountains and others landscape forms, water bodies, settlements, buildings, graves)
- Legends about giants and mighty people (Kalevipoeg, Vanapagan, Suur Tõll, Leiger, the mighty man of Petseri)
- Historical legends (kings, warriors, robbers, places of refuge etc.)
- Legends about hidden treasures

The database of place-lore “Koobas” has been set up by the EFA Place-lore Working Group and the database is merged with the National Heritage Board's cluster database. Research, digitization, publication and fieldwork of local traditions have taken place with the support of various research grants and national programs. The working group cooperates with various research institutions, such as the Centre for Archeological Research of the University of Tartu, the Institute of the Estonian Language, and many regional organisatsions.

=== Collecting activities ===
Every year Estonian Folklore Archives receive contributions from volunteers and professional folklore collectors, schoolchildren and university students. As usual in recent years, collected material are recorded on diverse media carriers.

The President's Award for collecting folklore (Estonian: Rahvaluule kogumispreemia) is given annually since 1994 to recognise and acknowledge the best contributors to the Estonian Folklore Archives.

The circle of people, who help to record folklore, has been widening through collecting contests. Contests are dedicated to specific topics. Thus, in 2009 it was “The Finland of My Memories”, in 2011 – “Teatetants” (Relay Dance), in 2012 – “Something Funny Happened to Me”, in 2013 – competition for children's games collection, in 2014 – “Stories about Our Homes”, etc. The participants are mainly elderly people; yet, there are also schoolchildren and youngsters among them. In addition to standard Estonian, contributions are made in Russian, as well as in Estonian dialects (for instance, Võru, which can be also considered as a separate language).

The availability of the means to conserve digital material has also introduced specific problems; for example, some collecting campaigns may result in the acquisition of a disproportionally large amount of a certain type of material, possibly causing diminished research interest in this type of material. In 2011, the countrywide campaign “Teatetants” was held to collect traditions of folk dance groups. In response to the appeal, 189 memory sticks, containing more than 3,000 pages of text and 13,600 photos – in addition to audio and video files – were sent to the Archives. This unprecedented large corpus consisting of an array of different media files was so unusual in the history of the Folklore Archives that after preliminary description, more radical steps had to be taken. Due to the limited human resources and storage conditions, only a quarter of the huge number of photos have been previewed; photos depicting recurring motifs have been grouped and the lists of captions compiled. It was decided that the rest of the material will be left unprocessed; for the time being it is currently waiting to be archived.

On April 20, 2010, employees of the Estonian Folklore Archives created an institutional Facebook account to increase the efficacy of relevant folklore collection. The action was inspired by the ash cloud from the Icelandic volcano and the impact of this on the life of people all over the world.

== Publications ==
There are several series published by the Estonian Folklore Archives.

=== Monumenta Estoniae Antiquae ===
Monumenta Estoniae Antiquae is the series of fundamental publications compiled on the basis of the Estonian Folklore Archives' materials by the EFA in cooperation with other folkloristic institutions.

- Initiated in 1876 by Jakob Hurt, the first subseries Monumenta Estoniae Antiquae I: Estonum Carmina Popularia is dedicated to old type Estonian folk songs in trochaic meter (regilaul). Each volume of this series contains folk songs recorded from one parish and until now 13 volumes have been published. These include songs from Põlva (1886), Kolga-Jaani (1886), Kuusalu (1938), Karksi (1938), Mustjala (1985), Kihnu (1997, 2003), Jõhvi and Iisaku (1999), Lüganuse (2009), Paide and Anna (2012), Kodavere (2014), Vaivara and Narva (2018), and Laiuse (2019) parishes.
- The second subseries Monumenta Estoniae Antiquae II: Eesti muistendid is dedicated to Estonian legends thematically divided into five volumes published between 1959 and 2014. The volumes published until now focus on legends about mythical giants (1959, 1963, 1970) and mythological diseases (1997, 2014).
- The third subseries Monumenta Estoniae Antiquae III: Proverbia Estonica presents Estonian proverbs. This fundamental source publication was published in five volumes between 1980 and 1987. In addition to three volumes of texts (I–III) the series contains appendixes that provide information about folklore collectors (IV) and translations into Russian (V:1) and German (V:2).
- The fourth subseries Monumenta Estoniae Antiquae IV: Aenigmata Estonica is dedicated to Estonian riddles. This series was published between 2001 and 2013. The two first volumes contain riddle texts, the third volume provides for readers indexes of folklore collectors and international parallels.
- The fifth subseries Monumenta Estoniae Antiquae V: Eesti muinasjutud is the anthology of Estonian folk tales. Until now in this series have been published two volumes (2009, 2014) that concentrate on fairy tales. These scholarly editions of fairy tale types stored at the Estonian Folklore Archives provide an overview of all types of Estonian fairy tales (the first volume contains stories of ATU 300–480, the second volume ATU 500–749). There are two textual samples of most of the tale types. If there are fewer than ten recordings, one text is selected; if the archive contains more than 75 texts, three texts are included. While selecting textual samples the editors attempted to include those stories that are as complete and as narratively developed as possible. As far as the geographical representation is concerned, texts were chosen from all over Estonia. Furthermore, some textual samples have been derived from the Lutsi Estonian area in Latvia and from Estonian enclaves in Russia and elsewhere.

=== Commentationes Archivi Traditionum Popularium Estoniae (Eesti Rahvaluule Arhiivi Toimetused) ===
Commentationes Archivi Traditionum Popularium Estoniae is the Archives’ publication series that was published in 1935–1941 (16 volumes) and was restored in 2000. Since then 19 new volumes have been published, including monographs and collections of articles authored by the employees of the Archives. These works have been published in German, English and Estonian. List of the publications in this series is available on Archives' homepage.

=== Pro Folkloristica ===
The series is created as a space for young researchers participating at the traditional spring conference of young folklorists and ethnologists. Other areas of cultural research, such as history, semiotics, literature and linguistics, are also represented. The source material for the research is archival texts and recordings as well as field materials collected by the authors. In the articles, the context of Estonian folkloristics often serves for novel theories and methods of interpreting source material. Between 1993 and 2017 eighteen volumes have been published in this series.

=== Estonian Settlements (Eesti asundused) ===
The series includes publications on Estonian villages in Siberia. Between 1995 and 2017 seven volumes have published in this series.

=== Recordings from the Estonian Folklore Archives ===
This series was started in 2001. Up to May 2019 13 volumes have been published. List of the publications in this series is available at http://folklore.ee/kirjastus/?sari=9 and below some volumes (those that have online English versions available) have been listed.

Vol. 3: Anthology of Estonian Traditional Music This Anthology of Estonian Traditional Music provides an overview of the earlier Estonian folk music tradition. Estonian Folk Songs and Instrumental Music compiled by Herbert and Erna Tampere and Ottilie Kõiva published in 1970 set with an accompanying song texts was the original edition. In 2003, the enlarged edition Anthology of Estonian Traditional Music was published on CDs with added parallel English translation of the texts. The anthology includes 115 archival recordings from the years 1912–1966. On the page of each song or instrumental piece there is a recording of the piece and abbreviated notation. The songs also have lyrics with added translation into English. At the bottom of the page there is a reference of details concerning each performer, his or her home place, the collector, time of collection as well as the archival reference of the original recording in the Estonian Folklore Archive.

Vol. 5: Songs of Siberian Estonians The online collection of songs of Estonians in Siberia is based on a CD anthology Songs of Siberian Estonians published in 2005 at the Estonian Literary Museum. Majority of the songs, dances and instrumental pieces were recorded during the fieldwork of the Estonian Folklore Archives in Siberia during 1991–2000. The most important addition to the anthology is video material introducing the dances of Siberia's Estonians. The material in the publication is sequenced according to villages. The publication contains an introduction and description of sound and video recordings. These recordings correspond to the 2015 set of disks. Songs are arranged alphabetically and can be browsed either according to titles or first lines. Each song contains a further description of the performer's name/residence/year/recording itself/sheet music/lyrics and occasional commentary from the performer.

Vol. 7: Songs of Siberian Seto The song anthology is a cross-section of the Setos in Siberia and Seto/Estonian/Russian folk songs repertoire. Seto Songs are sung by multiple singers (lead singer and choir in a usual setup) with variant versions. The anthology consists of complete song/lyrics/summaries in a trilingual compilation (Estonian/Russian/English).

Vol. 8: Traditional Music and Customs of Saaremaa This publication contains a selection of Saaremaa songs/dances/examples of customs. The material recorded and compiled by Ingrid Rüütel and her colleagues in 1961–2012. The recording encapsulates the islander's song lore of the 20th century. Film segments showcase meetings with local song makers/singers/instrumentalist giving an insight to the repertoire.

=== Journal of Ethnology and Folkloristics ===
This is a joint publication of the Estonian National Museum, the Estonian Folklore Archives of the Estonian Literary Museum, and the University of Tartu (Department of Ethnology; Department of Estonian and Comparative Folklore). The website of the journal (http://www.jef.ee/) provides full texts of articles.

== Procedure for use of the archive’s collections ==
The collections of the Estonian Folklore Archives (Eesti Rahvaluule Arhiiv) are open to all for research purposes, with the exception of materials on which access limitations have been imposed. Following a simple procedure that makes the client abide by the regulations of the Estonian Literary Museum as well as the applicable laws of the Republic of Estonia (Personal Data Protection Act, Public Information Act, copyright laws, etc.). Estonian Folklore Archives guarantees the confidential treatment of all personal data provided by the users. Copies of original EFA materials can be ordered, provided that copies can be made without damaging the original. More information regarding the referencing system for works accessed at the archives, ordering copies as well as the pricelist may be found at the Archive's Procedure For Use webpage.

== Recent controversy ==
The EFA was in the news at the beginning of 2020 due to not having received funds for research projects in the year. This became the subject of Eesti Televisioon’s current affairs show “Aktuaalne Kaamera. Nädal,” which discussed the views of cultural personalities like poet Kristiina Ehin, folk musician Mari Kalkun, Trad.Attack! member Jalmar Vabarna, among others, speaking out for the protection of folklore archives at a time when the government is perceived as more focused in granting support for scientific research and its direct economic benefits.
