= Kalkun =

Kalkun may refer to

- Kalkun Cay, United States Virgin Islands, an islet in the United States

People

- Andreas Kalkun (born 1977), Estonian poet, musician and folklorist
- Gustav Kalkun (1898–1972), Estonian discus thrower
- Karl Kalkun (1927–1990), Estonian actor
- Mari Kalkun (born 1986), Estonian singer and musician
