= Jakob Hurt =

Estonian ethnologist, folklorist and linguist

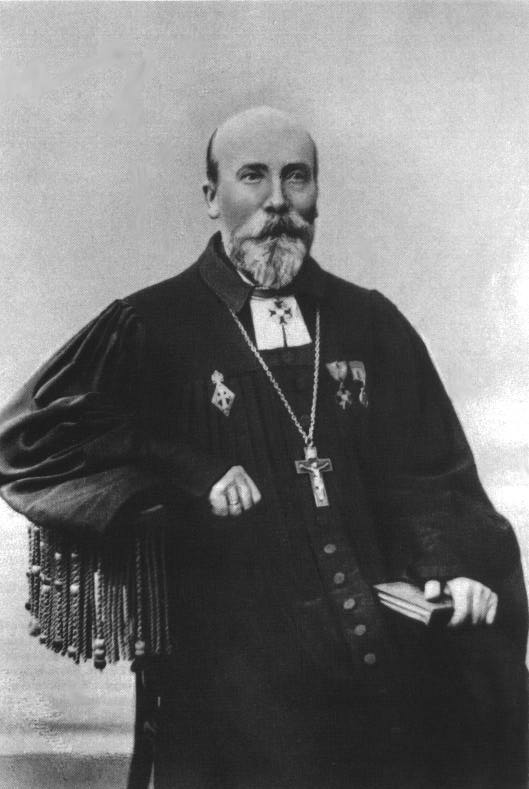
Jakob Hurt as a pastor in St. Petersburg

Jakob Hurt (22 July [O.S. 10 July] 1839 – 13 January 1907 [O.S. 31 December 1906]) was an Estonian folklorist, nationalist, and theologian. He was a major figure in the Estonian national awakening and worked as a pastor in Otepää and Saint Petersburg. While he was president of the Society of Estonian Literati, he oversaw a project to collect hundreds of thousands of works of poetry and folklore in the Estonian language. Hurt was featured on the 10 krooni note from 1991 to 2012.

== Life ==
Jakob Hurt was born on 22 July 1839 in Himmaste. He attended the University of Tartu from 1859 to 1863 where he studied theology, during which time he first became active in Estonian nationalism. He became well known in the nationalist movement in 1869 when he spoke at the first Estonian Song Festival, helping initiate the National Awakening. He spoke to the importance of a sense of shared beliefs and language in developing a national culture.

Hurt wished to become a pastor, but the ethnically German pastors did not allow him to because of his nationalism. Instead, he worked as a schoolmaster and was elected president of the committee of the Estonian Aleksander School in 1870. He was selected as president of the Tartu Farmers' Society in 1871 and the Society of Estonian Literati in 1872. He began an initiative to compile Estonian poetry and folklore, which resulted in a collection of 261,589 works with the assistance of 1,400 volunteers.

Hurt finally became a pastor when he was elected to lead the congregation of Otepää. He held this position until 1880, when further disputes with the German pastors led him to move to Saint Petersburg. He became pastor for Saint John's Church, which served the city's Estonian community. He attended the University of Helsinki, where he received a doctorate in 1886. Hurt began writing essays on Estonian poetry and folklore in 1888, producing a total of 156 essays by the time of his death. He left St. John's Church in 1901. Hurt died in Saint Petersburg on 13 July 1907.

== Legacy ==
After his death, Hurt's compilation of Estonian literature was given to the Finnish Literature Society, where it could be safely preserved and copied, and it was studied by Kaarle Krohn. Oskar Loorits began working in 1924 to establish a folklore archive in Estonia using Hurt's collection, and the Estonian Folklore Archives was founded in September 1927. The archive undertook a project to digitize his collection in 2011 and 2012.

Hurt was an honorary alumnus of the Estonian Students' Society. He was featured on the 10 krooni note from its introduction in 1991 until the currency's replacement by the euro in 2012.

== Bibliography ==
- Rudolf Põldmäe, "Noor Jakob Hurt". Eesti Raamat, Tallinn 1988
- "Jakob Hurt 1839-1907". Koostanud Mart Laar, Rein Saukas, Ülo Tedre. Eesti Raamat, Tallinn, 1989
- Mart Laar, "Raamat Jakob Hurdast". Ilmamaa, Tartu 1995
