= Aado Lintrop =

Estonian poet, religious researcher and folklorist

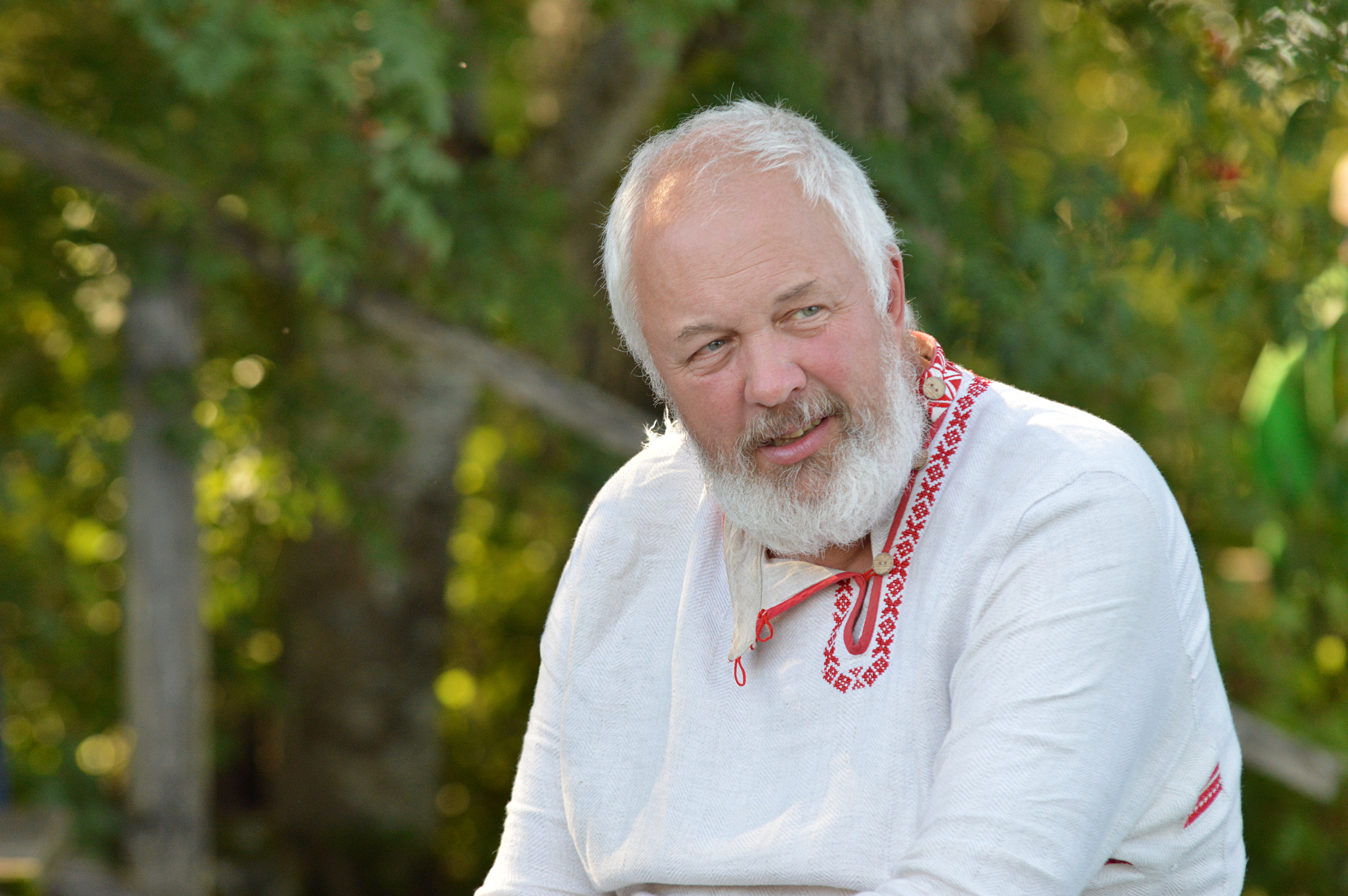
Aado Lintrop

Aado Lintrop (born 9 June 1956, Tallinn) is an Estonian poet, religious researcher and folklorist.

He graduated from the University of Tartu with a degree in Estonian and Finno-Ugric philology in 1995. The same year, he also received a master's degree in Estonian and comparative folklore. He received his doctorate from the University of Tartu in 2000 in Estonian and comparative folklore. From 1979 until 1990, he worked at Estonian National Museum. Since 2000, he has been working at the Estonian Literary Museum.

From 2004 to 2005, he was the head of Estonian Literary Museum's Estonian Folklore Archives.

== Selected works ==
=== Poetry ===
- Asuja (1985)
- Sõnaristi (2000)
- Annapurna (2010)
- Õhtud sõidavad õue (2011)
- Orus ja mäel (2013)
- Päev on ulakas plika (2016)
- Tõusta mägede õlule (2018)

== Awards ==
- 5th Class of the Order of the White Star (2025)
