= Walter A. Anderson =

Walter A. Anderson may refer to:

- Walter Artur Anderson (1885–1962), Baltic German ethnologist and folklorist
- Walter A. Anderson, Dean of the Steinhardt School of Culture, Education, and Human Development from 1960 until 1964
