= Levenberg =

Levenberg is a surname. Notable people with the surname include:

- Dana Levenberg, American politician
- Elias Levenberg (1903–c. 1941), Jewish Estonian teacher
- Jill Levenberg (born 1977), South African actress
- Kenneth Levenberg (1919–1973), American statistician
- Yehuda Levenberg (1884–1938), American Jewish figure
