= Mari Väina =

Estonian folklorist (born 1972)

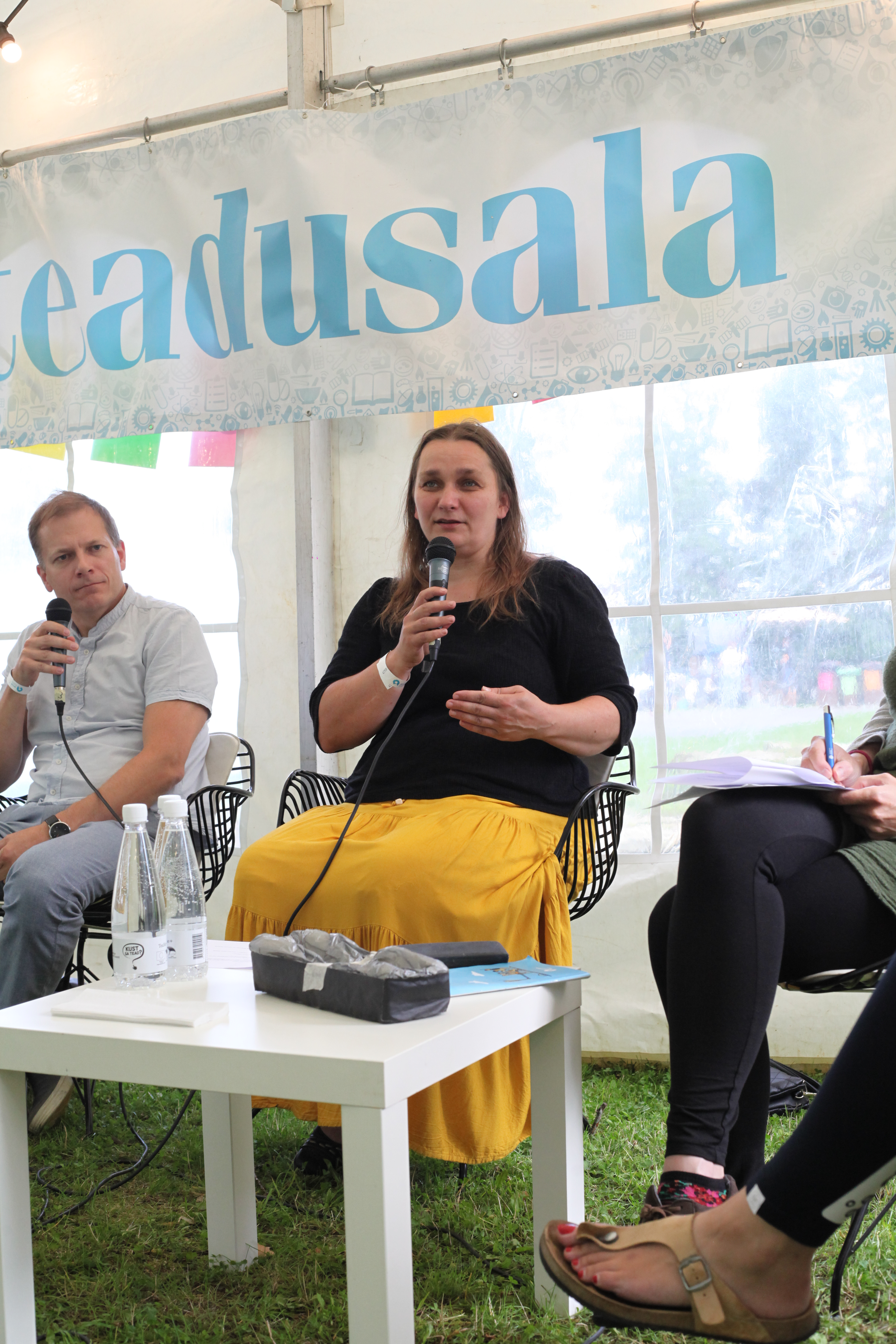
Mari Sarv, 2020

Mari Väina, formerly Mari Sarv (born 22 August 1972), is an Estonian folklorist with interests in poetic folklore. Since 1996 she is with the Estonian Literary Museum. As of 2022, she held the position of senior researcher.

During 1990-1991 she studied economics at the Tallinn University of Technology. She obtained her master's degree (thesis: "Regilaul kui poeetiline süsteem") in 1999 and Ph.D. degree (thesis: "Loomiseks loodud: regivärsimõõt traditsiooniprotsessis") in 2008, from the University of Tartu.

She has been has been carrying out activities in the application of digital tools in humanities in Estonia and since 2013 she has been an organizer of the annual conference in the field.

The nomination for her 2022 Folkloristics Award stated that using digital humanities tools, she conducted research of the metrics and vocabulary relationships of runic songs from different regions of Estonia, as well as from other Baltic Finnic peoples. Her research provided verification of the current knowledge about these songs, confirming or disproving various statements about them. She said that when she was working on Ph.D., it became clear to her that computers can do the analysis of verses much faster than humans.

Mari Väina (Sarv) has been serving at various Estonian research boards an councils.

== Awards ==
- 2022: Estonian Folklore Annual Award for her innovative approach to the study of Estonian runic songs.
