= Himmaste =

Village in Estonia

Himmaste Himmastõ
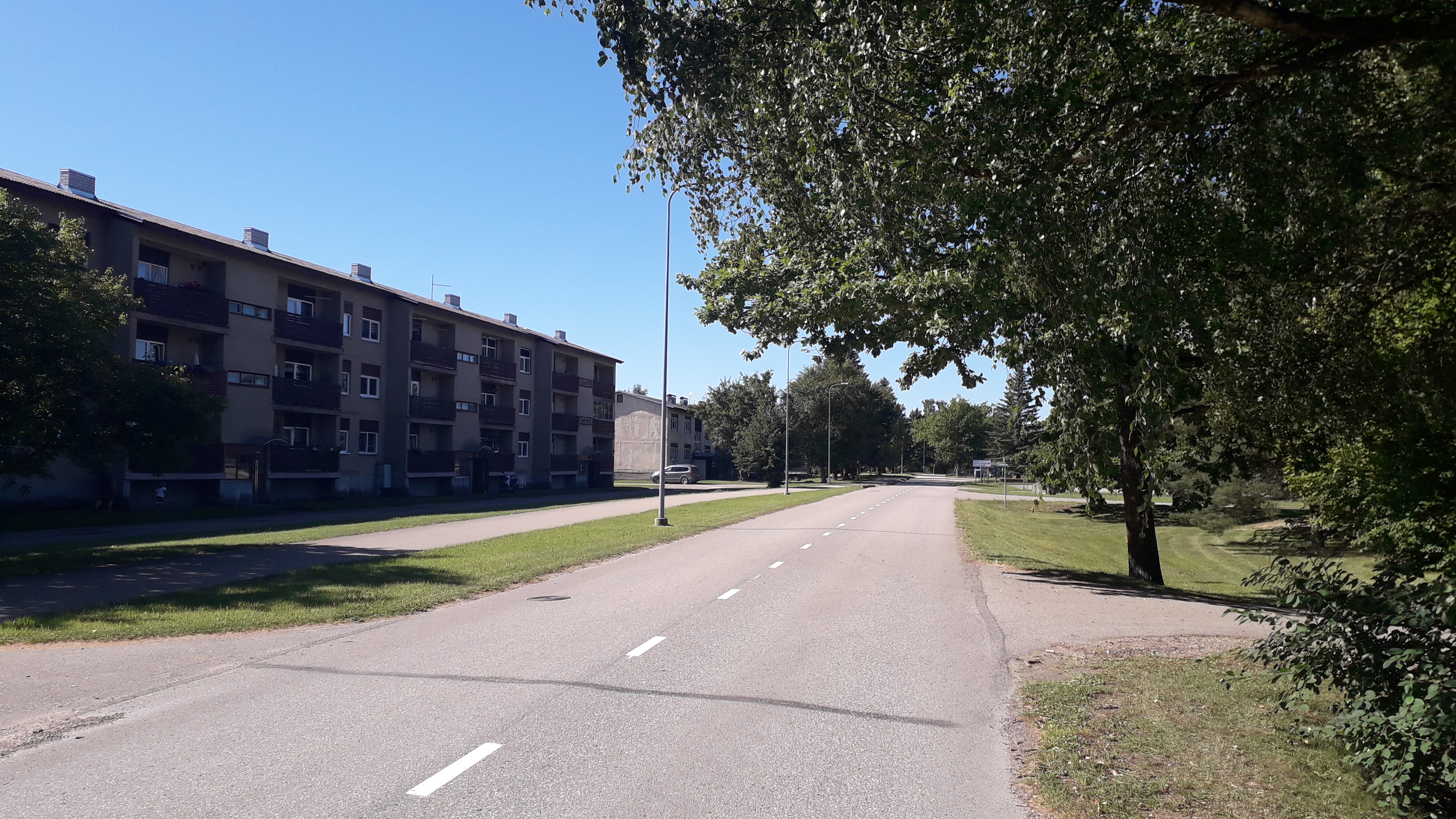

- Location within Estonia
- Coordinates: 58°4′37″N 27°4′27″E
- Country: Estonia
- County: Põlva County
- Time zone: UTC+2 (EET)

Himmaste (Võro: Himmastõ) is a settlement in Põlva Parish, Põlva County in southeastern Estonia.

Folklorist, theologist, linguist and national awakening figure Jakob Hurt (1839–1907) was born as the son of a local schoolteacher in Himmaste.
