= Risto Järv =

Estonian folklorist (born 1971)

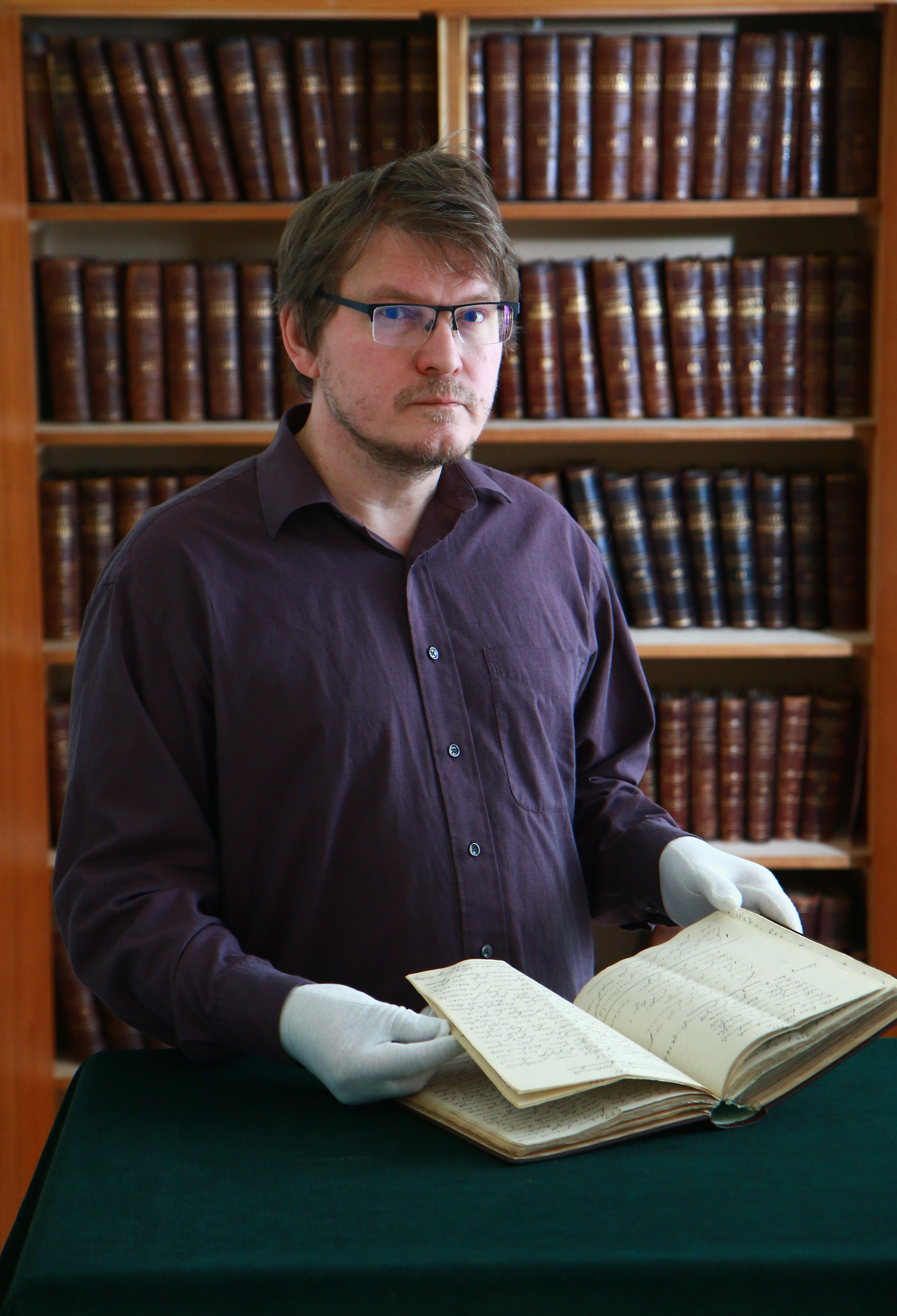
Risto Järv

Risto Järv (born 15 January 1971) is an Estonian folklorist. Since 2009 he is the head of Estonian Folklore Archives.

In 2005 he finished his doctoral studies at Tartu University, focusing on Estonian and comparative folklore.

He is member of several organizations, including Estonian Digital Humanities Society.
