= Elias Levenberg =

Jewish teacher and folklorist in Tartu, Estonia

Elias Levenberg (Latvian: Eliass (Elja) Lēvenbergs, Yiddish: אליהו לעוונבערג, German: Elias Lewenberg; 25 (18) July 1903, in Tartu – 1941 or 1942, in Latvia), was a Jewish teacher and folklorist in Tartu, Estonia.

== Biography and family ==
Elias Levenberg was born in Tartu into family of Chaye Sore Levenberg, who originated from Vidzy, and Samuel Chaim-Leib Levenberg. As shown Levenberg's collector's remarks in his folklore records, in 1908–1912 the family lived in Tartu, and in 1915–1918 in Riga where he finished elementary school and Jewish middle school.

In 1927 Levenberg settled in Tartu, perhaps, with his mother and with his wife Zisla (Sisla) Leveberg (Shver). On 4 April 1930 she gave birth to a son Sīmanis (Simon) in Riga. In Tartu also lived Levenberg's aunt B. Usharov.

In 1927 Levenberg entered the faculty of Law of Tartu university. 2 September 1927 he passed the test of Estonian, required to be accepted to the university. The test was administrated and scored by Johannes Aavik, an experimentalist modernizer of Estonian language, who was a language inspector at that time. Yet, the same year Levenberg moved to the faculty of Philosophy, which he did not finish; at least in annual lists of actual students his name is mentioned during 1930–1934, 1933–1935 and 1936–1938 years.

From 1 September 1927 Elias Levenberg started to teach Yiddish language and literature in the Jewish elementary school in Tartu (Tartu linna 17 (juudi) algkool), and in Jewish private school (Juudi Erarealkool) and continued at least till 1939. Besides that he taught English and singing.

Living in Estonia Levenberg remained a Latvian citizen. In 1939 he appealed for Estonian citizenship, but his appeal was dismissed.

Since 1939 Levenberg lived in Riga and was murdered in Latvia in 1941 or 1942.

== Contribution to folkloristics ==
In Tartu university Levenberg was taught folkloristics by Walter Anderson, who invented and popularised the gathering of self-records from school children. Following this model Levenberg started in 1929 to gather from pupils of Jewish elementary school's 4–6 grades self-records of beliefs, jokes, songs and alike for Estonian Folklore Archives, where was created a special fond for Jewish collections: ERA Juudi 1 and ERA Juudi 2.

Later he added to the Archives materials recorded from his mother, records from various people and self-records. From 1929 till 1935 he wrote down and contributed to Estonian Folklore Archives more than 800 items of Jewish Yiddish folklore, which is the biggest personal contribution within collections. In a public report in 1931 Levenberg was named among most active collectors of the Estonian Folklore Archives.
