= St. John's Church (Saint Petersburg) =

Church building in Saint Petersburg, Russia

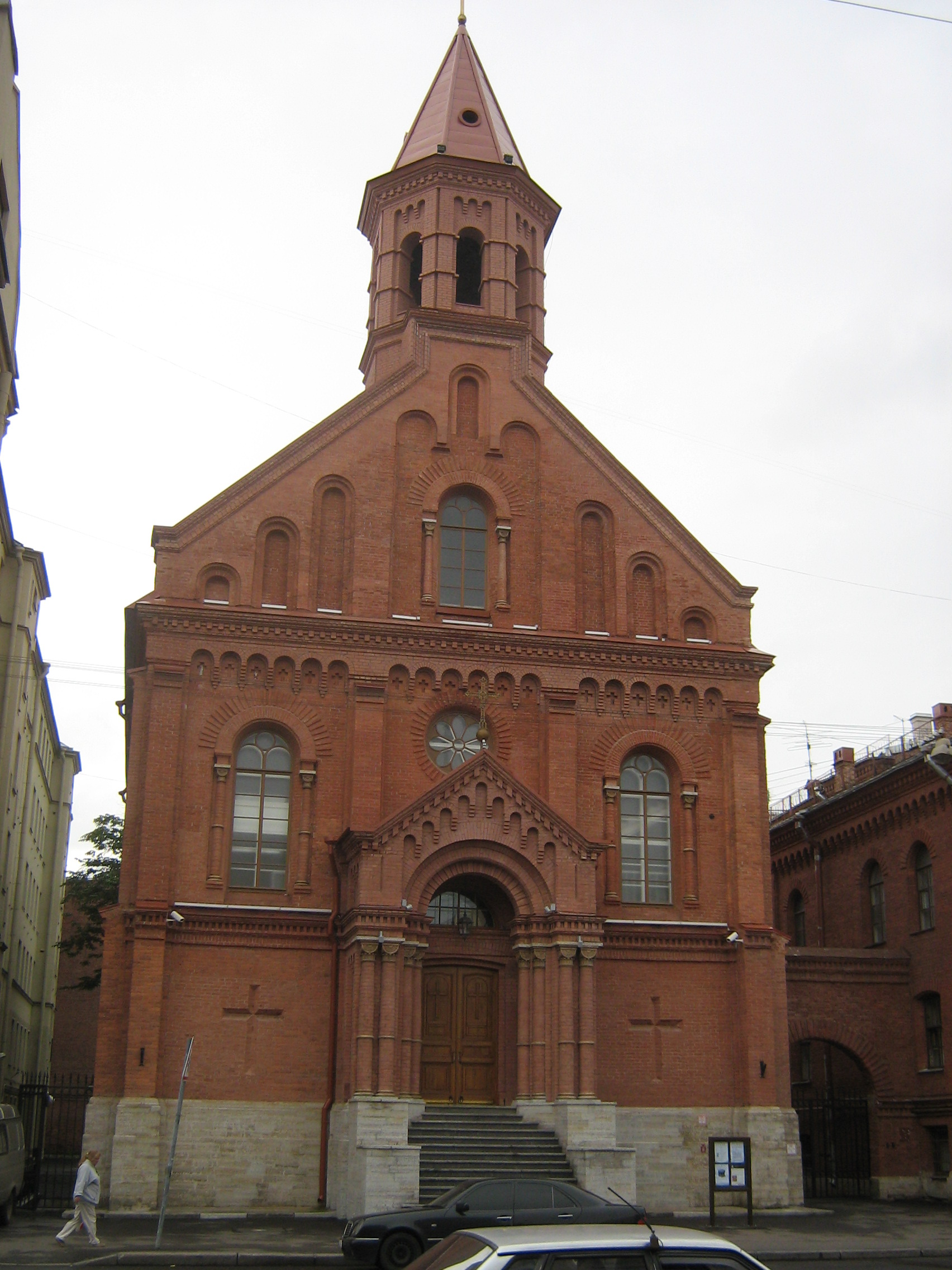
- St. John's Church
- 59.924°N 30.2866°E
- Location: St. Petersburg
- Country: Russia
- Denomination: Lutheran

St. John's Church (Russian: Церковь Святого Апостола Иоанна; Estonian: Jaani kirik) is a Protestant church in St. Petersburg, Russia. The church is situated at the address 54 ulitsa Dekabristov, close to the Mariinsky Theater. Founded in 1859 to serve the Estonian community living in the city at that time, it is considered Estonia's symbol of independence. It was the place where in 1888 Jakob Hurt made the call to resist the Tsarist government's russification policy and on March 26, 1917, 40,000 Estonians began their march to Tauride Palace demanding national autonomy.

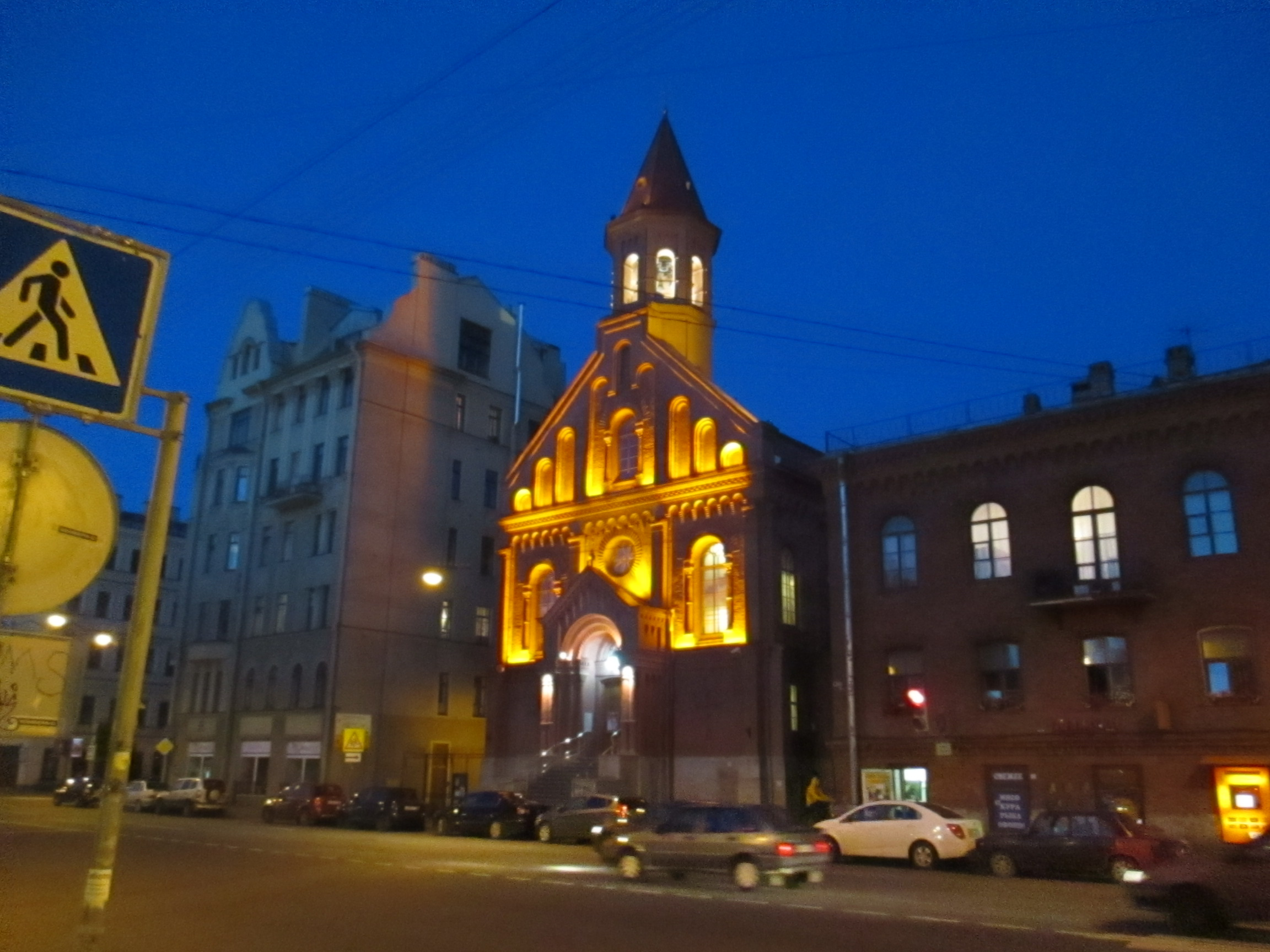
St. John's Church in Saint Petersburg at night

Closed in 1930 by the Soviet government, the belfry and portal was demolished and the building used for warehousing and workshops. The church underwent a $8.61 million renovation beginning in July 2009 and was reconsecrated on February 22, 2011, by the Archbishop of the Evangelical Lutheran Church of Estonia Andres Põder with the Estonian President Toomas Hendrik Ilves in attendance. As of 2014 St. John's Church belongs to Estonia.
