= W. F. H. Nicolaisen =

German folklorist (1927–2016)

Wilhelm Fritz Hermann Nicolaisen (13 June 1927 – 15 February 2016) was a folklorist, linguist, medievalist, scholar of onomastics and literature, educator, and author with specialties in Scottish and American studies.

== Early life and education ==
Nicolaisen was born in Halle an der Saale in east-central Germany, near Leipzig. His father was a professor of agriculture. He attended the University of Kiel in Germany from 1948 to 1950 where he studied folklore, language, and literature. In 1950 he attended King's College Newcastle in England. He returned to Germany to study at the University of Tübingen, where he received his Dr. Phil. magna cum laude in comparative linguistics, English, and German in 1955. Among his professors were renowned folklorists Kurt Ranke and Walter Anderson. Having been awarded a "Scholarship for Advanced Studies in Arts" by the University of Glasgow, he later received Bachelor and Master of Letters degrees (1956, 1970) in Celtic Studies. His dissertation in Germany had been on the river names of the British Isles ("Die morphologisch und semasiologische Struktur der Gewassernamen der britischen Inseln") and in Glasgow, he focused on Scottish river names ("Studies in Scottish Hydronymy"). In 1958, he married May Marshall in Scotland and they had four children: Fiona, Kirsten, Moira, and Birgit.

== Career ==
At universities in Glasgow and Dublin Nicolaisen taught German language and literature and from 1956 to 1969 he worked in the School of Scottish Studies at the University of Edinburgh as head of the Scottish Place-Name Survey. He had research interests in language (particularly place names), in folklore (narrative and balladry), in literature (medieval classics and Scottish poets and novelists), and in cultural history (Scotland, the British Isles, and Scandinavia). In the fall of 1966, Nicolaisen came to Ohio State University in the United States as visiting professor of English and folklore. In 1967, he returned to the University of Edinburgh, becoming the acting head of its School of Scottish Studies in 1968. The following year, he left for the United States to take the position of associate professor in the English Department at Binghamton University.

''At Binghamton university, Nicolaisen was one of four professors in the English department specializing in literature and folklore. alongside his colleague Elizabeth tucker, he developed a diverse curriculum of courses. together, they expanded the folklore program at Binghamton and served as editors of New York Folklore, the journal of the New York Folklore society.''

By 1981, Nicolaisen had engaged in the State University of New York's decision to develop the field of Folklore at Binghamton, one of four University Centers considered. Both Nicolaisen and Tucker were influential at the state and national levels in Folklore. In 1983, one English major graduated with that specialization, folklorist Kathryn [Kimiecik] Foley, MA. Folklorist Dr. Simon J. Bronner had graduated previously from Binghamton in 1974.

Throughout the seventies and eighties Nicolaisen and Tucker were critical in the maintenance of Folklore as both field of study and place for theory. Importantly, The New York Folklore Society flourished and continues to provide active public education of all kinds.

Nicolaisen brought an ancient world of intellectual academia with him when he arrived in New York. His study at the University of Tuebingen provided a rigorous scholarship. Equally important, however, was his cheeriness and sense of wry humor. Folklore courses at Binghamton were extremely popular with non-English majors. He grounded a generation of Bachelor of Arts in intellectual advancement and enjoyment, all in the name of Liberal Arts and Humanities.

Before his arrival at Binghamton, Nicolaisen had already completed his twelve years as the head of The School of Scottish Studies at the University of Edinburgh (1957-1969). Nicolaisen also brought with him experience in Northern European Folklore, both places where universities' histories could be counted in centuries. That richness was added to the SUNY scholars who were home-grown and gave depth to American, post-secondary public education at Harpur College, Binghamton University. In 1985 the school honored him with the title of distinguished professor of English and folklore. At the university, he served as director of graduate studies of English and director of the linguistic program. Upon retirement in the 1990s, he moved back to Scotland, where he took a post of honorary professor at the University of Aberdeen and visiting professor at the University of Aarhus in Denmark.

== Recognition ==
He took leadership roles in a number of learned societies including service as president of the American Folklore Society, American Name Society, International Congress of Onomastic Sciences, the Folklore Society, New York Folklore Society, and the Middle Atlantic Folklife Association. He received the American Folklore Society's lifetime achievement award in 2002. He also was named a fellow of the Finnish Academy of Science and Letters and the American Folklore Society. A festschrift in his honor was published as Creativity and Tradition in Folklore: New Directions edited by Simon J. Bronner (1992). It includes a bibliography of his publications from 1957 to 1991, and indicative of his transatlantic connections, features scholars from Europe and the United States.

He died on 15 February 2016 at the age of 88 in Aberdeen, Scotland.

== Scholarship ==
Nicolaisen's first publications, beginning in 1957, were on place names. To show their relations in time and space and their cultural connections to the views of ethnic communities through history, he collected narratives attached to them. His work culminated almost twenty years later in Scottish Place Names, a monumental volume that won the Chicago Folklore Prize for outstanding contribution to folklore studies. His output of over 600 journal articles and essays built on this foundation to move into narrative studies, including research on legend, ballad, folktale, jokes, personal experience narrative, and literature. In his narrative studies, Nicolaisen repeatedly examined the linguistic structures that guide formation into narrative. Overall, he insisted that the materials of tradition were creative rather than static. He defined the relationship between creativity and tradition as basic to the process of folklore; he viewed them in tension, not in contradiction.

"Names and Narratives", the title of his presidential address to the American Folklore Society in 1983, indicate major theoretical questions regarding the processes by which traditional expressions are created and spread. Nicolaisen suggested regarding folkness not in terms of societal status but as an appropriate behavioral response to the stimulus of certain circumstances—a "cultural register rather than a cultural level." As a student of linguistics, Nicolaisen recognized register as a reference to a form of language appropriate to a limited situation. Together with the linguistically derived idea that textual structures and variable situations guide the nature of expression, the act—or art—of storytelling largely informs Nicolaisen's viewpoint. Nicolaisen recognized that narratives breed variation because they are reconstituted in performance, although their integrity as stories is maintained. They are, in his words, "the inevitable and necessary result of social interaction, of the need to narrate oneself and each other in never-ending fictions" (1991: 10).

Nicolaisen was active in linking geography to the study of folklore and language, and was one of the founders of the Society for North American Cultural Survey to promote work in the field. Nicolaisen was an advocate for mapping folk culture in America as an applied form of folklore study so as to visualize the ways that people "make regions." Nicolaisen insisted that the geographic approach has a profound implication for folklore studies. This approach suggests folk culture as a whole with registers, isoglosses, and dialects. His goal, he stated in essays such as "Variant, Dialect, and Region" for the journal New York Folklore with which he was associated for many years, was of achieving a geography of tradition that could lead to a geography of the human mind.

== Selected publications ==
- 1961. "Field-Work in Place-Name Research." Studia Hibernica 1: 74-88.
- (ed.) 1968. Transactions of the Third International Congress of Celtic Studies. Edinburgh.
- 1970 (with M. Gelling and M. Richards). The Names of Towns and Cities in Britain. London: B.T. Batsford.
- 1970. "Gaelic Place-Names in Southern Scotland." Studia Celtica 5:15-35.
- 1972. "Onomastics--An Independent Discipline?" Indiana Names 3:33-47.
- 1973. "Folklore and Geography: Towards an Atlas of American Folk Culture." New York Folklore Quarterly 29:3-20.
- 1973. "Place-Names in Traditional Ballads." Folklore 84:299-312.
- 1975. "Place Names in Bilingual Communities." Names 23:167-74.
- 1976. Scottish Place-Names. London: B.T. Batsford.
- 1976. "Folk and Habitat." Studia Fennica 20:324-30.
- 1976. "Place-Name Legends: An Onomastic Mythology." Folklore 87:2, 146-159.
- 1978. "The Folk and the Region." New York Folklore 2:143-49.
- 1978. "English Jack and American Jack" Midwestern Journal of Language and Folklore 4:27-36.
- 1978. "How Incremental is Incremental Repetition?" In Patricia Congroy, ed., Ballads and Ballad Research, 122-33. Seattle: University of Washington Press.
- 1980. "Variant, Dialect and Region: An Exploration in the Geography of Tradition." New York Folklore 6:137-49.
- 1980. "Space in Folk Narrative." In Nikolai Burlakoff and Carl Lindahl, eds., Folklore on Two Continents: Essays in Honor of Linda Degh., 14-18. Bloomington, Indiana: Trickster Press.
- 1980. "Time in Folk Narrative." In Venetia Newall, ed., Folklore Studies in the Twentieth Century. 314-19. Woodbridge, Suffolk: D.S. Brewer.
- 1980. "What is Your Name? The Question of Identity in Some of the Waverley Novels." Names 28:255-66.
- 1983. "Folklore and...What?" New York Folklore 9:89-98.
- 1984. "Names and Narratives." Journal of American Folklore 97:259-72.
- 1984. "Legends as Narrative Response." In Paul Smith, ed. Perspectives on Contemporary Legend, 167-78. Sheffield: University of Sheffield.
- 1987. "The Linguistic Structure of Legends." In Gillian Bennett et al., eds. Perspectives on Contemporary Legend, vol. II, 61-67. Sheffield: Sheffield Academic Press.
- 1989. "Kurt Ranke and Einfache Formen." Folklore 100:113-19.
- 1990. "Why Tell Stories?" Fabula 31:5-10.
- 1990. "Maps of Fiction: The Cartography of the Landscape of the Mind." Onomastic Canadiana 72:57-68.
- 1991. "The Past as Place: Names, Stories, and the Remembered Self." Folklore 102:3-15.
