= Monumenta Estoniae Antiquae =

Publication series about Estonian folklore

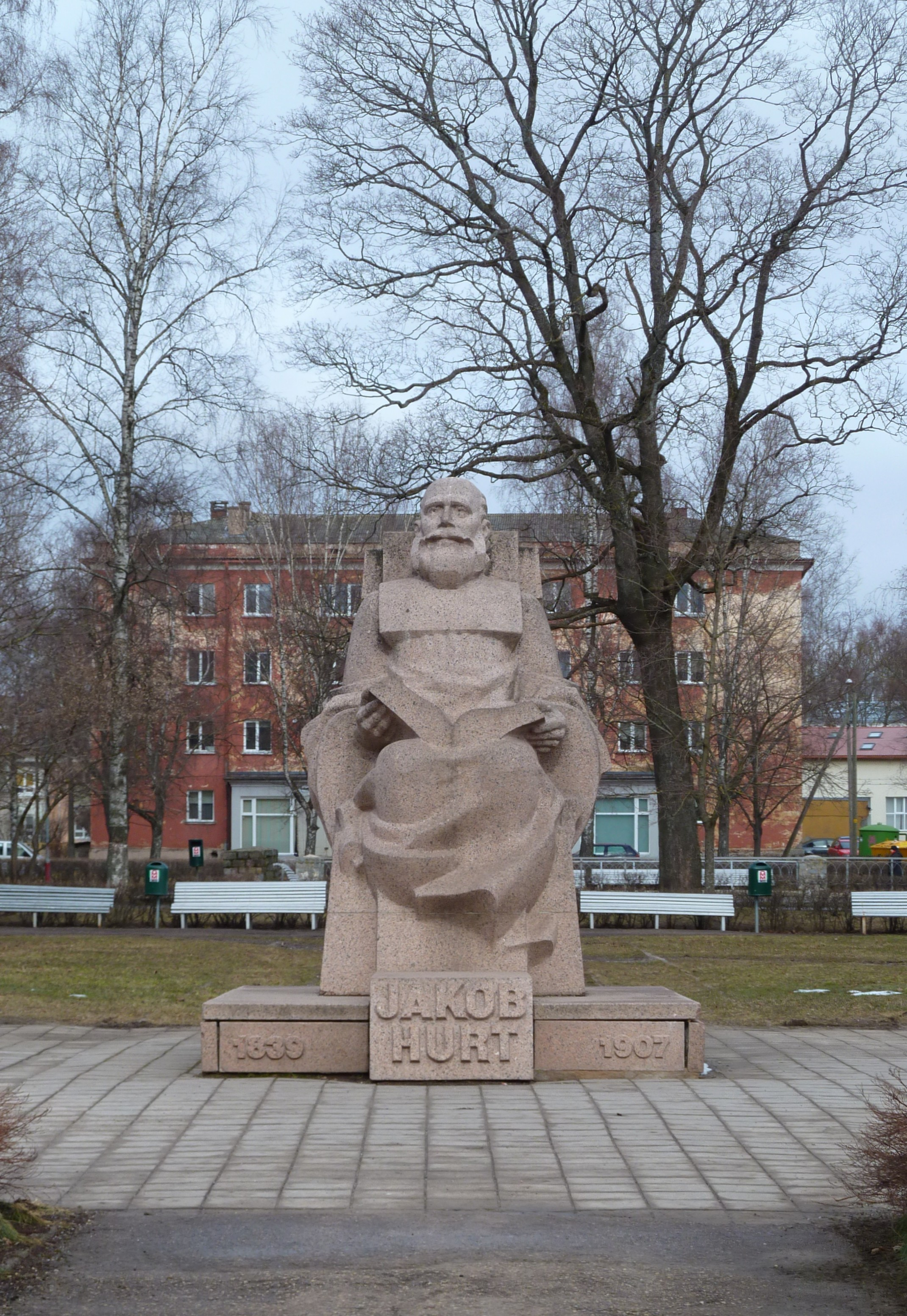
Monument to the organiser of Monumenta Estoniae Antiquae in Tartu

The Monumenta Estoniae Antiquae is an academic publication series of Estonian folklore, including folksongs in trochaic verse form (regilaul), legends, proverbs, riddles and folk tales.

== History ==
Interest in Estonian folklore began at the beginning of the 19th century. The Learned Estonian Society was established in 1839 as the central organisation for the collection and study of Estonian folklore. It was this society that coordinated the compilation of the Estonian epic Kalevipoeg, begun by Friedrich Robert Faehlmann and completed by Friedrich Reinhold Kreutzwald.

In 1843 Kreutzwald initiated the idea of the systematic collection of Estonian folklore. Alexander Heinrich Neus, under the auspices of the Society of Estonian Literati (Eesti Kirjameeste Selts), founded in 1842, published a three volume anthology of Estonian folksongs in 1852. This three volume set of some 1,300 songs is considered the first scholarly publication.

Soon after Dr. Jakob Hurt assumed the presidency of the Estonian Literati Society in 1872, a project was initiated for the systematic collection of folklore across Estonia. Both collecting and editing was coordinated by Jakob Hurt, organising around 1,400 volunteer collectors through appeals, through the press, brochures and personal correspondence. Hurt had planned the publication of a six-volume series to be called the "Monumenta Estoniae Antiquae".

Between 1875 and 1886 two volumes of folksongs were published under the serial title Vana Kannel, (in German, Alte Harfe). Each volume contained the total material from one parish (kihelkond), thus establishing a principle of geographical and dialectal, rather than thematic, unity. Vana Kannel I gathered up the songs of the Põlva Parish in south-eastern Estonia, and volume II included those of Kolga-Jaani in central Estonia. Hurt was about to complete a third volume, the songs of the Viljandi Parish in central Estonia, but difficulties of publishing and the continual inflow of new material intervened.

Between 1904 and 1907, under the auspices of the Finnish Literature Society, Hurt published a three volume series of songs (Setukeste laulud) from the Setumaa district in southern Estonia. Later in 1907, Jakob Hurt died.

During the 1930s, the Estonian Folklore Archives revived Hurt's original project and published volumes III and IV of Vana Kannel in 1938 and 1941 respectively. Edited by Herbert Tampere, the third volume contains songs of Kuusalu Parish and the fourth volume songs of Karksi Parish. A fifth volume containing songs from Muhu island was under preparation, however World War II intervened. At that point songs from only four parishes and Setumaa, out of a total of 112 parishes, were in print.

During the Soviet period, the Monumenta Estoniae Antiquae project was revived in the mid-1950s, with an additional 40 volumes planned. The plan was to publish a volume on the Haljala parish on the island of Saaremaa in 1960, then publish one volume per year for the next 40 years through the joint efforts of the Museum of Literature and Tartu University. However, nothing came of that plan until 1985, when Vana Kannel 5 (Mustjala parish) was published. Kannel 6 (Haljala parish) was published in 1989. On the resumption of independence, volumes 7 (Kihnu parish) and 8 (Jõhvi and Iisaku parishes) were published in 1997 and 1999 respectively.
