= Isidor Levin =

Jewish folklorist and theologian

Isidor Levin (Latvian: Izidors Levins; September 20, 1919 – July 24, 2018) was a Latvian Jewish-born Soviet/Estonian folklorist, narrative researcher, theologian, and Professor Emeritus at the St. Petersburg Institute of Religion and Philosophy. Levin was an internationally recognized folklorist, who supported the study of Estonian culture and helped Estonian researchers continue their work during the Soviet occupation.

He was born in Daugavpils, Latvia in September 1919. Levin moved from Latvia to Estonia in 1937 to study at the University of Tartu in the area of Judaic and Semitic studies at the Faculty of Philosophy and Jewish Studies. Later he studied Comparative Folklore with Walter Anderson and Oskar Loorits, graduating in 1941. During the Nazi occupation, Levin, who was Jewish, was hidden by his teacher Uku Masing. From 1952 to 1955 he studied Russian language and literature at the Leningrad Pedagogical Institute. The following year he became a lecturer in German folklore at the Leningrad Institute of Germanic Studies. In 1967 he obtained a PhD at the Institute of Oriental Studies of the Russian Academy of Sciences in Moscow.

Levin was one of the founding members of the International Society for Folk Narrative Research (ISFNR) and was an honorary member of the Folklore Fellows. He latterly donated his personal library to the University of Tartu and in 2001 was awarded the Order of the White Star, 4th Class, by then-president Lennart Meri. He died in July 2018 at the age of 98.

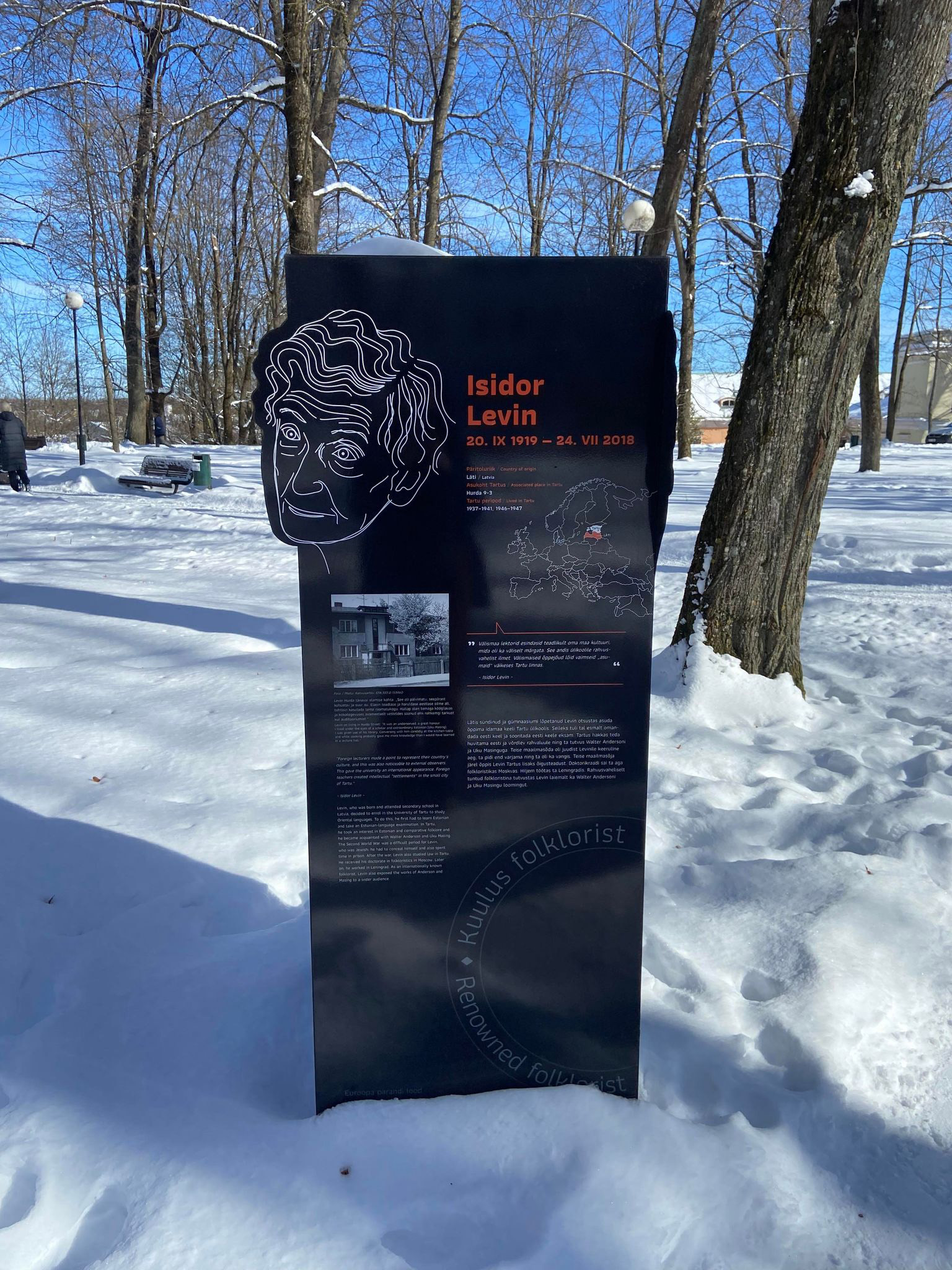
The memorial to folklorist Isidor Levin (1919-2018) in Tartu, Estonia.

== Recognition ==
- 2001 Order of the White Star (Class IV)
- 2012 Granted Estonian citizenship for meritorious service in support of Estonian culture
