= Hugo Treffner =

Estonian educator (1845–1912)

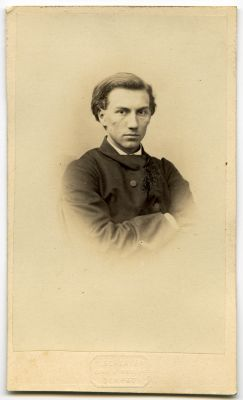
Hugo Treffner; photograph by Georg Friedrich Schlater

Hugo Hermann Fürchtegott Treffner (17 July 1845 – 13 March 1912) was an Estonian educator. He was the founder of the Hugo Treffner Gymnasium in Tartu, and he was a figure in the Estonian national awakening. He also served as editor of Oma Maa from 1886 to 1891 and Eesti Postimees from 1887 to 1888.

== Life ==
Hugo Hermann Fürchtegott Treffner was born in Kanepi Parish on 17 July 1845. His father worked at the parish's church. After learning under a private tutor, Treffner began attending Tartu kubermangugümnaasiumis in 1860 before moving to Võrus Poeglaste Era Õppe- ja Kasvatusasutuses in 1863. After finishing there in 1865, he took a test at the University of Tartu that authorised him to become a schoolmaster. He began working as a private tutor before attending the University of Tartu in 1868. He briefly studied philology with the Faculty of History and Philology before moving to the Faculty of Theology the same year.

Treffner became part of the Estonian national awakening in the 1870s, working with several nationalist-affiliated organisations and aligning himself with Carl Robert Jakobson. Treffner co-founded the Estonian Students' Society in 1875, and he served on the committee for Estonian Aleksander School from 1882 to 1884. He was a committee member for the second and third Estonian Song Festivals. Treffner finished his studies with the Faculty of Theology in 1880. He made several attempts to become a pastor, but each parish rejected him for his nationalist leanings and his association with Jakobson.

Treffner opened a private German-speaking boys' school, Hugo Treffner Gymnasium, in 1883. He also taught religion at St. Mary's School, beginning in 1886. He became editor of the Oma Maa magazine in 1886 and took ownership of the Eesti Postimees newspaper in 1887; he sold the Eesti Postimees the following year. Treffner co-founded another nationalist organisation, the Society of Estonian Literati, which he led from 1887 to 1890. Hugo Treffner Gymnasium was required to switch from German to Russian instruction in 1889 under the authority of the Russian Empire.

Treffner ended his tenure as editor of Oma Maa in 1891. While still running his own school, he began teaching religion at Pushkin Gymnasium for Girls in 1899. Treffner died on 13 March 1912.

== Legacy ==
Treffner did not write a significant body of literature, instead preferring verbal discourse. Treffner's nephew Konstantin Treffner became director of Hugo Treffner Gymnasium in 1917, and he made it an Estonian-language school in 1918. Treffner was the model for the main character of the novel Truth and Justice, Maurus, which was written by his student A. H. Tammsaare.
