= Kaagvere =

Village in Estonia

Coordinates: 58°20′49″N 26°54′49″E

- Village
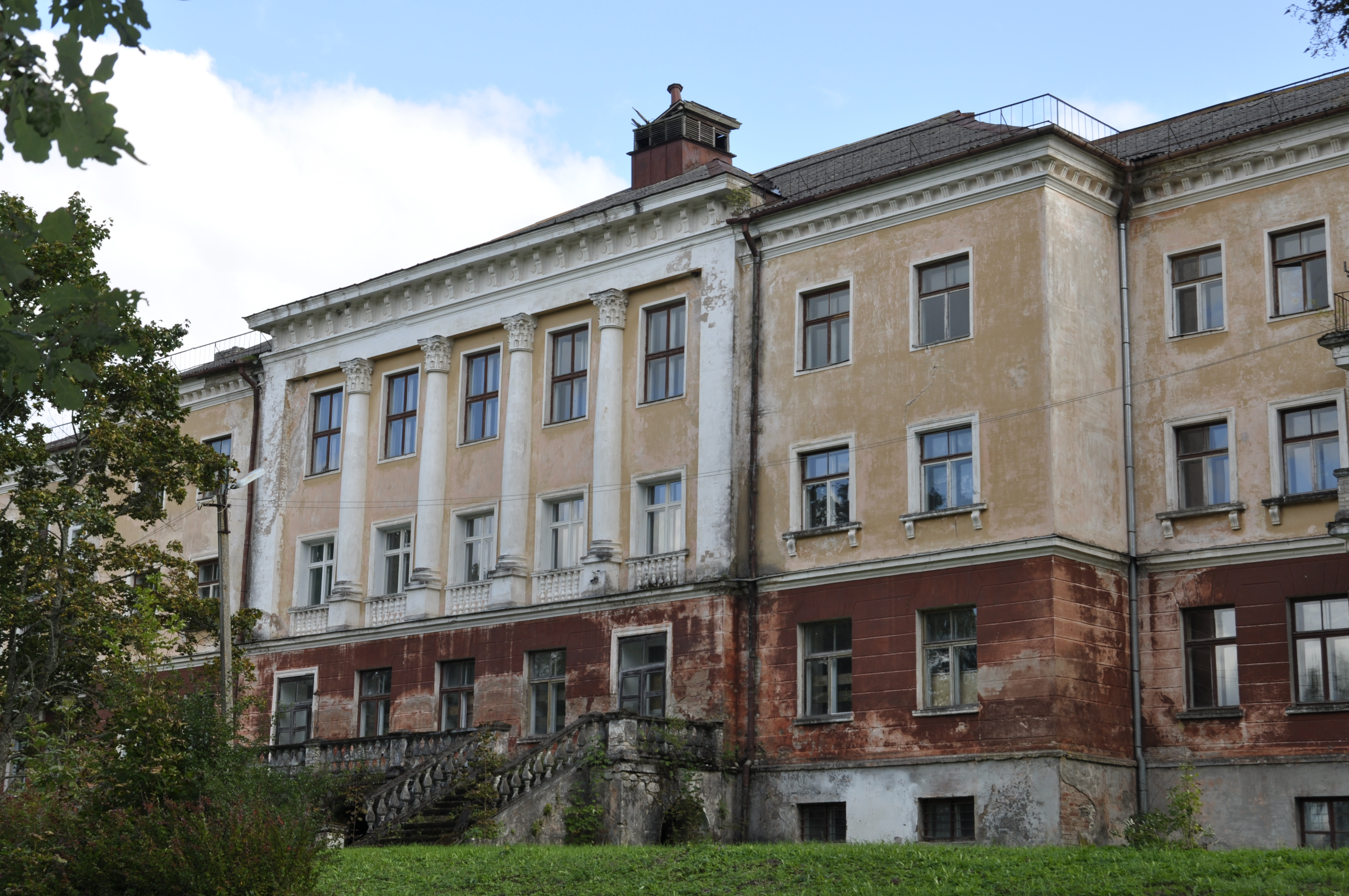
- Kaagvere manor
- Interactive map of Kaagvere
- Country: Estonia
- County: Tartu County
- Parish: Kastre Parish
- Time zone: UTC+2 (EET)
  - Summer (DST): UTC+3 (EEST)

Kaagvere is a village in Kastre Parish, Tartu County in eastern Estonia.

== See also ==
- JK Luunja
