= Society of Estonian Literati =

Scientific organization based in Estonia

The Society of Estonian Literati (Estonian: Eesti Kirjameeste Selts – EKmS) was an influential association of Estonian intellectuals based in Tartu between the years 1871 and 1893.

== History ==
The articles of the Society of Estonian Literati was adopted in 1871. In March 1872 the first meeting was held in Viljandi. The society included the main Estonian writers, poets, artists and journalists of the time. Leading personalities were, among others, Friedrich Reinhold Kreutzwald, Hans Wühner, Jakob Hurt, Carl Robert Jakobson, Hugo Treffner and Johann Köler.

The aim of the society was the promotion of the Estonian language and literature in to enrich Estonian social life and a greater understanding by Estonians of their history and culture.

The society published approximately 100 items during its 18-year existence between 1873 and 1890. From 1887 the society also organized literary competitions. Under Jakob Hurt the Society systematically collected Estonian folk poetry. Members of the Society collected old documents, coins and ethnological artifacts. The society built an extensive library and organized numerous lectures.

At the beginning of the 1880s were internal political disputes between Jacob Hurt and Carl Robert Jakobson on future direction. In 1881 Hurt left with a group of his followers and Jakobson died a year later. The beginning of the Russification of Estonia split the society further. One group took a moderate stance towards the Tsarist demands, the other was an Estonian nationalist faction who largely rejected these concessions.

On 28 April 1893, the society was shut down by the Tsarist authorities.

== Presidents ==
- Jakob Hurt (1872–1881)
- Carl Robert Jakobson (1881/1882)
- Mihkel Veske (1882–1886)
- Hugo Treffner (1887–1890)
- Karl August Hermann (1890/1891)
- Johann Köler (1891–1893)

== Publications ==
- Friedebert Tuglas: Eesti Kirjameeste Selts. Tegevusolud, tegelased, tegevus.. Tartu 1932

== See also ==
- Learned Estonian Society
