= Andreas Kalkun =

Estonian (Seto) poet, musician and folklorist

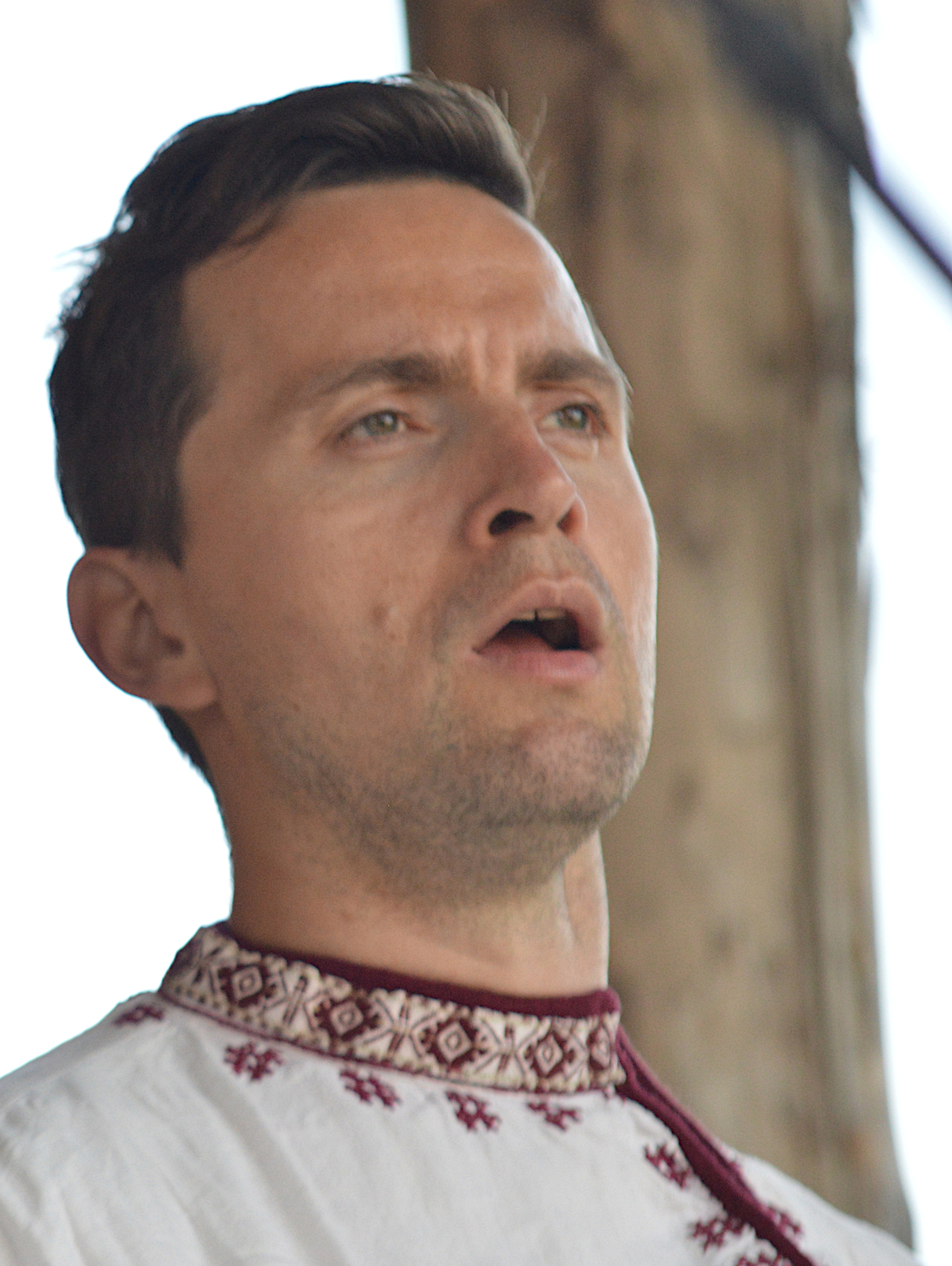
Andreas Kalkun in 2016

Andreas Kalkun (born 28 April 1977) is an Estonian (Seto) poet, musician and folklorist.

In 2003 he finished his master studies in University of Tartu, studying Estonian and comparative folklore. In 2011 he finished his doctoral studies at University of Tartu. Since 2005 he is working at Estonian Literary Museum.

He has been a member of Seto folk music groups Liinatśuraq and Ütsiotsõ. His cousin is folk musician Mari Kalkun.
