= Walter Anderson (folklorist) =

Baltic German folklorist (1885–1962)

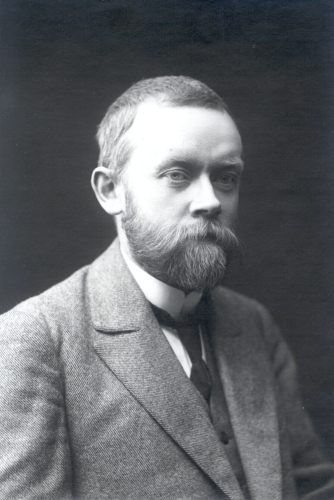
- Walter Anderson around 1930
- Born: 10 October [O.S. 28 September] 1885; Minsk, Minsk Governorate, Russian Empire
- Died: 23 August 1962 (aged 76); Kiel, Schleswig-Holstein, West Germany
- Education: University of Saint Petersburg; University of Kazan; Friedrich-Wilhelm University of Berlin
- Known for: the law of self-correction
- Awards: Order of the White Star, 3rd class
- Scientific career
- Fields: Folkloristics; Literary history; Numismatics
- Workplaces: University of Kazan; University of Tartu; University of Königsberg; University of Kiel
- Thesis: Император и аббат: исторія одного народнаго анекдота
- Notable students: Oskar Loorits; Isidor Levin; W. F. H. Nicolaisen

Walter Arthur Alexander Anderson (Russian: Вальтер Николаевич Андерсон, romanized: Val'ter Nikolaevič Anderson; 10 October [O.S. 28 September] 1885 – 23 August 1962) was a Baltic German ethnologist (folklorist) and numismatist.

== Life ==
Anderson was born from a Baltic German family in Minsk (now in Belarus), but in 1894 moved to Kazan (Russia), where his father, Nikolai Anderson (1845–1905), had been appointed as professor for Finno-Ugric languages at the University of Kazan. Anderson's younger brother was the mathematician and economist Oskar Anderson (1887–1960), and his older brother was the astrophysicist Wilhelm Anderson (1880–1940). The turmoil created by the Russian Revolution prompted Anderson and his brother Wilhelm to leave Russia and to move to Tartu in Estonia. While living in Estonia in 1939, Anderson, like the majority of Baltic Germans living there, was resettled to Germany. In 1962 he died after having been involved in a traffic accident.

== Career ==
In 1904, Anderson enrolled at the University of Kazan, and from 1909 continued his studies in Saint Petersburg, where he received a Magister degree from the University of Saint Petersburg in 1911. During his time in Saint Petersburg he also catalogued the folk tales held in the archives of the Imperial Saint Petersburg Academy of Sciences and the Imperial Russian Geographical Society. For the 1911/1912 winter semester he enrolled at the Friedrich-Wilhelm University in Berlin, returning to the Kazan to continue his studies in the autumn of 1912. In 1916 he submitted his thesis on the ballad of the Emperor and the Abbot (AT 922) for which he received a Doctorate from the University of Kazan in 1918. He worked at the University of Tartu in Estonia between 1920 and 1939, where in 1920 he was made the first holder of a chair of folklore. Anderson's most significant students at the time were Oskar Loorits and August Annist and later Isidor Levin.

From 1920, he was a member of the Learned Estonian Society (Gelehrte Estnische Gesellschaft), Estonia's oldest scholarly organization, and from 1928 to 1929 he was the president of the society. In 1930 he, like his father Nikolai Anderson before him, was made an honorary member of the society. He also held honorary membership of the American Folklore Society and the Hellenic Folklore Society. In 1936 Anderson became a corresponding member of the Prussian Academy of Sciences. In addition to this he was a corresponding member of the Royal Gustavus Adolphus Academy, the Finnish Literature Society, the Finno-Ugrian Society and the Warsaw Scientific Society.

From 1940 to 1945, he worked at the University of Königsberg. After the end of the second world war he received a visiting professorship at the University of Kiel, which he held until his retirement. A notable student he mentored at Kiel was W. F. H. Nicolaisen who had a distinguished career in folklore studies in the United States and Scotland. In 1950 Anderson was invited to the US to take part in a meeting of the International Folk Music Council held in Bloomington, Indiana, after which he stayed at Indiana University Bloomington for a few months as a visiting scholar. He retired in 1953 but remained affiliated with the University of Kiel as emeritus professor until his death.

== Work ==
Walter Anderson was one of the driving forces behind the comparative geographic-historical Method of folkloristics. He is best known for his monograph Kaiser und Abt (Folklore Fellows' Communications 42, Helsinki 1923) on folktales of type AT 922. Anderson also had a keen interest in numismatics, and he published several articles in this field. Some of his contributions to the study of Islamic coins are considered to have been groundbreaking. For some time between 1920 and 1939 he also served as conservator for the coin collection of the Learned Estonian Society.

== Honours and awards ==
Anderson was awarded the Estonian Order of the White Star (3rd class) in 1938.

== Remembrance ==
To commemorate the 110th anniversary of Walter Anderon's birth, Department of Estonian and Comparative Folklore at the University of Tartu organized the symposium "Walter Anderson and Folklore Studies Today". In 2019, the centenary year of the Department, the University of Tartu established the annual Walter Anderson Memorial Lecture to honour Walter Anderson's memory.
