= Mari Kalkun =

Estonian singer (born 1986)

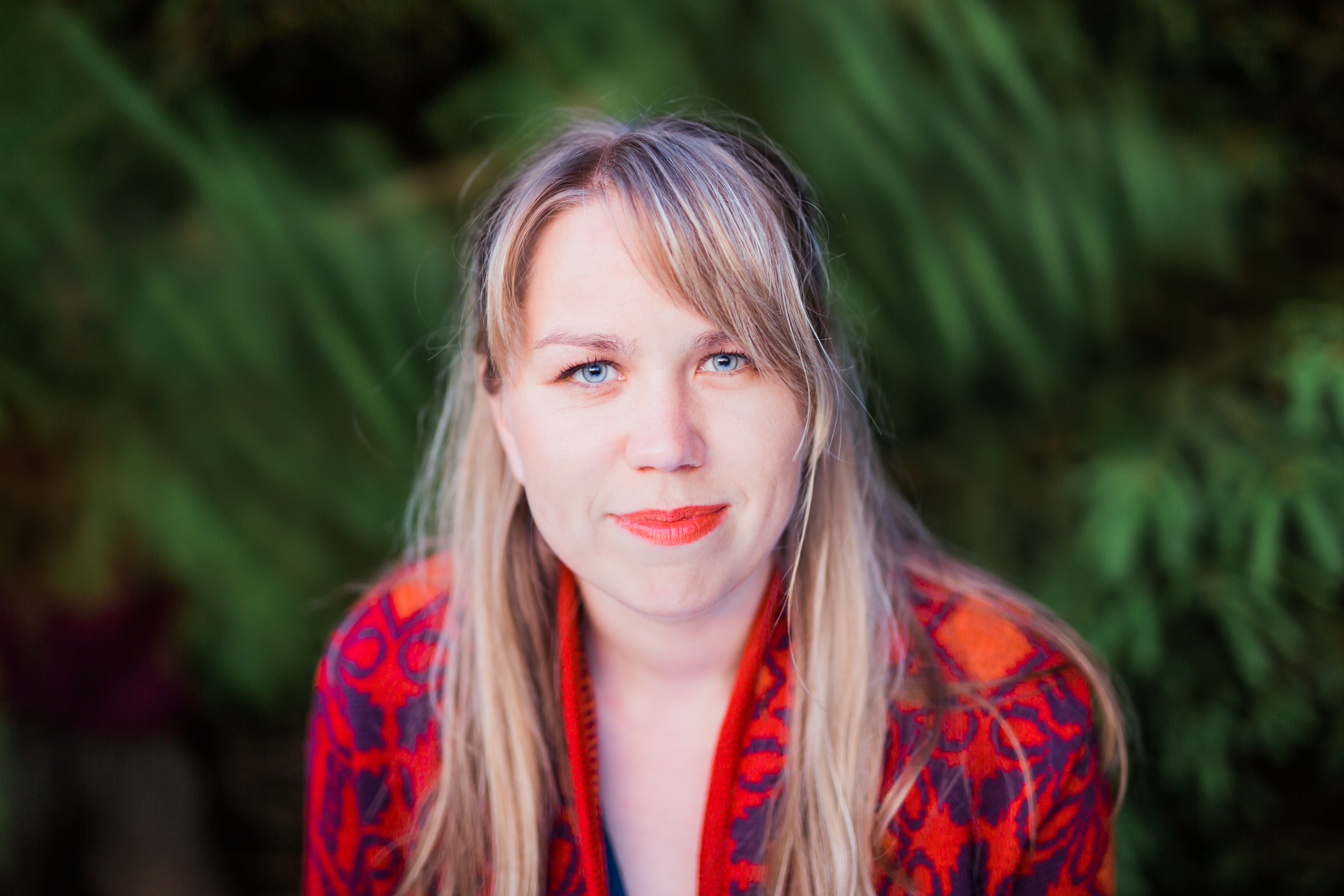
Mari Kalkun in 2017 (photo by Ruudu Rahumaru)

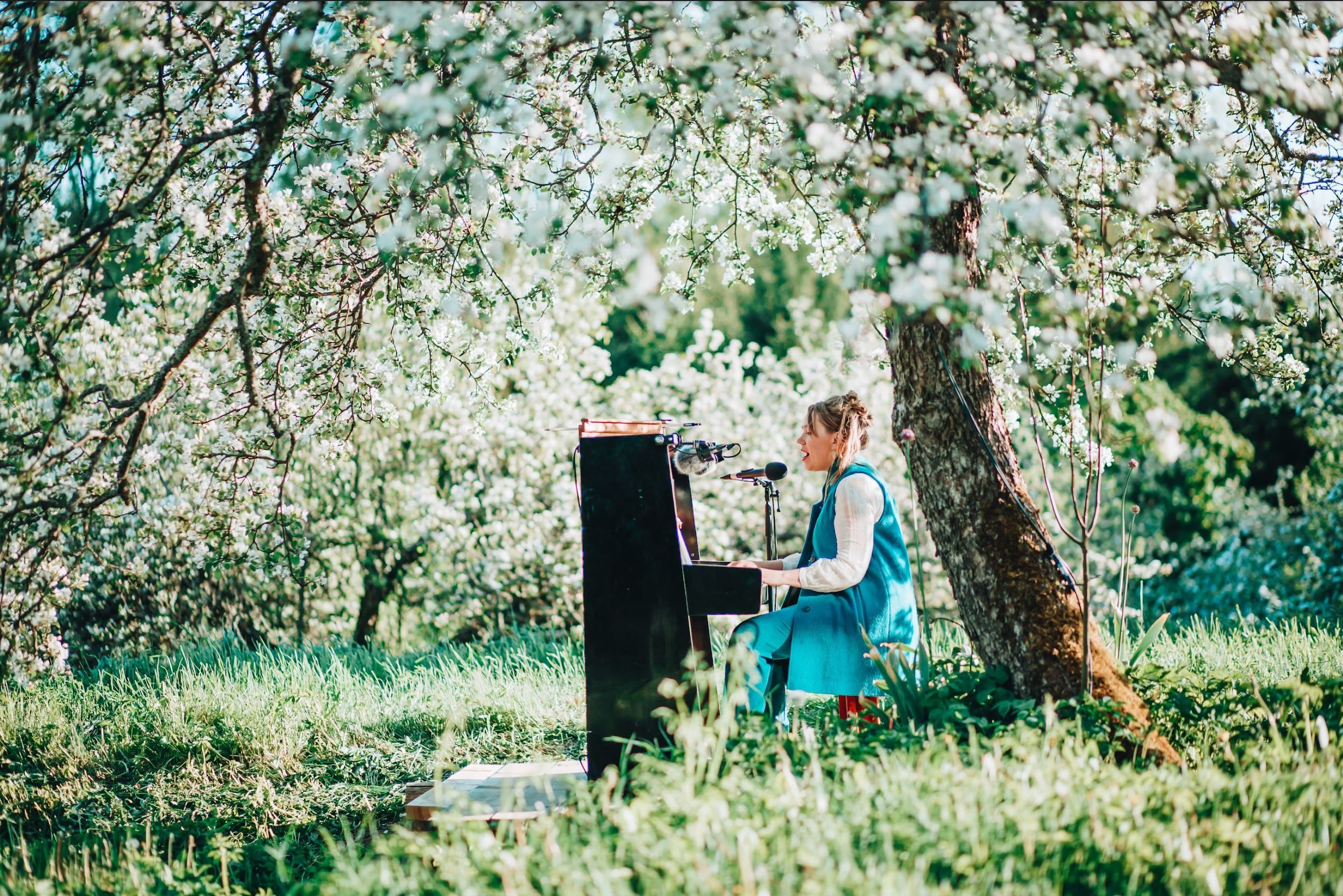
Mari Kalkun giving a concert in her home orchard in 2020 (photo by Ruudu Rahumaru)

Mari Kalkun (born 1 April 1986) is an Estonian singer and musician who specializes in contemporary folk music. She has performed at home and abroad with the ensemble Runorum, releasing several recordings since 2007. In 2013, she was voted the best singer at Estonia's Ethno Music Awards. Her widely acclaimed 2018 album Ilmamõtsan consists of the songs inspired by Estonian traditional folk music, especially that from the villages of Kalkun's native Võru in south-eastern Estonia.

== Biography ==
Born on 1 April 1986, Mari Kalkun was brought up in the Võru district in south-eastern Estonia where since her childhood she has been inspired by the surrounding woodlands, birds and bogs. Her cousin is musician and folkorist Andreas Kalkun, with whom she has also collaborated.

She first studied cultural management at the Viljandi Culture Academy, followed by music studies at the Estonian Academy of Music and Theatre. She was an exchange student at the Sibelius Academy in Helsinki, Finland, graduating with a master's degree in traditional singing. She has developed her specific style of combining folk music with jazz.

Kalkun not only sings but composes her own music and plays several instruments including the Estonian zither, piano, accordion and guitar. She released her first solo album Üü tulõk (Arrival of the Night) in 2007. Thanks to its success, she was invited to concerts in France, the UK, Finland and Russia. In 2009, she performed in Japan together with the Estonian artist Pastacas where a recording of her music was also released.

Later recordings include Dear Rain (2010), Tii ilo (2015) together with her Finnish band Runorun, and Upa-upa ubinakõnõ (2015) in her native Võro language. Ilmamõtsan was released in November 2017. It consists of 12 songs in Estonian and Võro, most of them written by Kalkun inspired by local poets.
