= Estonian Literary Museum =

Museum in Tartu, Estonia

Coordinates: 58.373931°N 26.717881°E

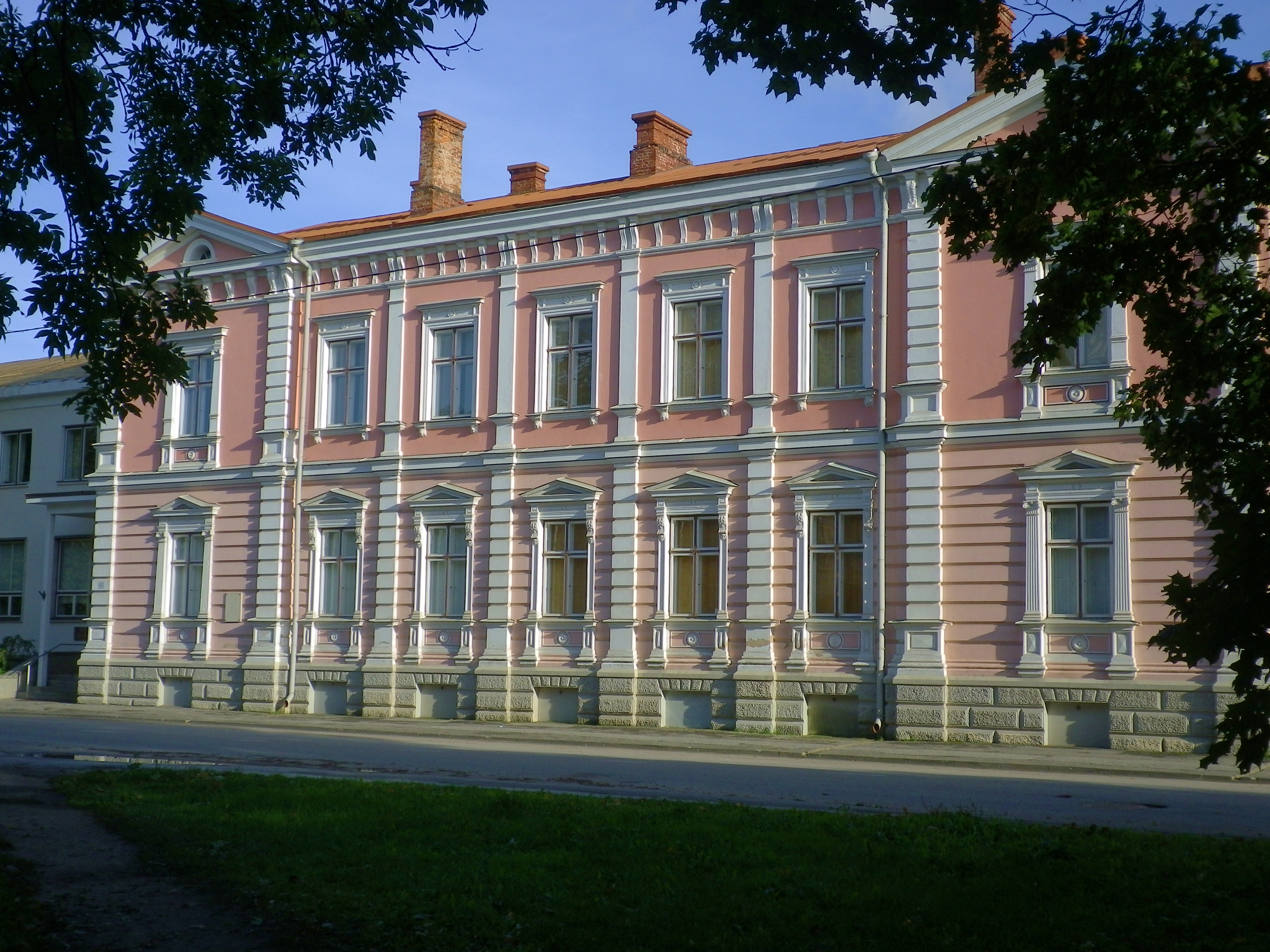
The Estonian Literary Museum's building in Tartu, Vanemuise 42

The Estonian Literary Museum (ELM; Estonian: Eesti Kirjandusmuuseum), is a national research institute of the Ministry of Education and Research of the Republic of Estonia. Its mission is to improve the cultural heritage of Estonia, to collect, preserve, research and publish the results. The current Head of the Estonian Literary Museum is Piret Voolaid.

== Structure ==
ELM from the Pepleri Street (2017). Photo: Alar Madisson (ELM).

The Estonian Literary Museum functions as an integrated institution that consists of four departments:

1. Archival Library of the Estonian Literary Museum, founded in 1909 with 10,000 Estonian language volumes, it currently has a stock of 809,000 works of books and periodicals in other languages, as well as pamphlets and maps.
2. Estonian Folklore Archives of the Estonian Literary Museum, founded in 1927. It explores the customs, folk dances, songs and text, etc. The collection particularly covers Estonian folklore, but also folklore of Finno-Ugric peoples, Baltic German, Russian, Jewish and other ethnic groups.
3. Estonian Cultural History Archives of the Estonian Literary Museum, established in 1929. It combines the previous collections of the academic societies such as Estonian Literary Society, Estonian Learned Society, Academic History Society and many others. The largest collection contains manuscripts and monographs, followed by those for photos, art, film and audio.
4. Department of Folkloristics of the Estonian Literary Museum, founded in 1947. Publishes academic journals and other series of folklore publications, and maintains the Estonian folklorists' web server www.folklore.ee.

Apart from the specific business of the divisions, they also organize exhibitions and campaigns, technical meetings, conferences and various seminars.

== History ==
ELM after the 2017 renovation (2017). Photo: Alar Madisson (ELM).

The history of the Estonian Literary Museum began in 1909 with the founding of the Estonian National Museum and Archive Library in Tartu. In 1924, the Estonian National Museum purchased a private house in Aia (now Vanemuise) Street for filing archival materials. The collections of Archival Library, as well as those of the later folklore and cultural history archives, were placed there. Today it is the main building of the Estonian Literary Museum, to which three extensions have been added.

During the Second World War, the institute was split into two state museums covering ethnography and literature. In 1946 the museums were re-combined. Starting in 1957 the Literary Museum has held a two-day conference on literature and folklore each December, the so-called "Kreutzwald days to remember" (Friedrich Reinhold Kreutzwald is an important Estonian writer). Some years after the restoration of independence in 1995, the museum received its former name back and extended the publication of its annual almanac to articles, primary source texts and research.

== Databases ==
There are about 50 databases in the Estonian Literary Museum. Most of them are specialized databases, for example, the graffiti database, the Estonian Runic Songs database and a database in English - the Estonian Droodles. Some of the databases have an option to be used in English. By 2016, the Estonian Literary Museum had 65 TB of data in its digital databases which is planned to increase up to 130 TB in the course of the project "Development of the Estonian Literary Museum to an International Center for Digital Humanities" by 2020. The databases are very different in size and technical solutions, also, they are created at very different times: from the 90's to the present. For example, in 2002, the database Analytic bibliography of Estonian Journalism was launched. The databases range from simple web publications to more complex structured databases such as the Kreutzwald's century. Content can be given in both digitized and text form, as well as pictures, sound and videos, accompanied with comprehensive metadata, such as time, place, maker etc. A project has also been launched to publish the materials of databases and other collections on the Meta-Share page, which already includes texts "1001 children's games from the year 1935".

== Directors ==
1940–1945 Mart Lepik (November 1940 – 19 February 1945)
1945 Richard Viidalepp
1945–1951 Alice Habermann (15 September 1945 – 22 February 1951)
1951–1952 In 1951–1952, an attempt was made to merge the Literary Museum with the Institute of Language and Literature, and the director was Heinrich Tobias, director of the Institute of Language and Literature (22 February 1951 – 1 August 1952)
1952–1954 Salme Lõhmus (1 August 1952 – 3 March 1954)
1954–1989 Eduard Ertis (24 February 1954 – 20 December 1989)
1990–1993 Peeter Olesk (20 December 1989 – 1993)
1993–1995 Rutt Hinrikus (October 1993 – March 1995)
1995–2005 Krista Aru
2005–2015 Janika Kronberg (1 June 2005 – 30 June 2015)
2015–2020 Urmas Sutrop (1 July 2015 – 30 June 2020)
From July 1, 2020, Martin Eessalu was the acting Director
On June 1, 2021, Tõnis Lukas became Director
From July 18, 2022, the Director of the Archives Library, Merike Kiipus, was appointed as the Director
On January 1, 2023, Piret Voolaid became Director

=== Kivike ===
The most central database in the Estonian Literary Museum is the file repository Kivike. It gathers up data from numerous other specialized databases in the Estonian Literary Museum, enabling the user to acquire information with less effort. The user can access the materials of the Estonian Literary Museum and make inquiries, as well as order the materials from the archives for further use. The materials in Kivike are free for research and teaching purposes. To date, there are 335,668 items (34 TB) in Kivike, a more detailed overview is given with the table on Kivike's website.

== Pictures of the ELM ==
ELM Panorama (2017). Photo: Alar Madisson (ELM)

ELM (2017). Photo: Alar Madisson (ELM)

The Glass Gallery of the ELM (2017). Photo: Alar Madisson (ELM)
