= Oskar Loorits =

Estonian folklorist (1900–1961)

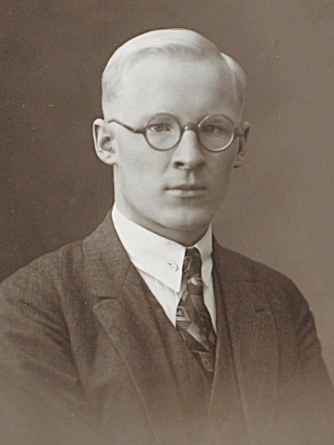

Oskar Loorits (9 November [O.S. 27 October] 1900 – 12 December 1961) was an Estonian folklorist.

== Life ==
Loorits was born in Suure-Kõpu Parish, Viljandi County. He initially studied folklore at the University of Tartu and obtained his doctorate in 1926. Between 1927 and 1941, he was a lecturer in Estonian and Comparative Folklore. Also during that period he was a director of the Estonian Folklore Archives. In 1938, he became a member of the Estonian Academy of Sciences. In 1944, he fled the Soviet occupation to Sweden and worked there until 1947 as an archive assistant. From then until shortly before his death he held a position in the folk archives of the University of Uppsala. He died in Uppsala, aged 61.

== Selected works ==
- Loorits, Oskar. Grammar of the Estonian language. Odamees, 1923.
- Loorits, Oskar. "Livonian fairy tales and fables variants." Helsingfors 1926 (Folklore Fellows' Communications Vol 21, 1 = No. 66).
- Loorits, "Oskar. "Estonian folk poetry and mythology." Tartu 1932.
- Loorits, Oskar. "Contributions to the Material Concerning Baltic-Byzantine Cultural Relations." Folklore 45, no. 1 (1934): 47-73.
- Loorits, Oskar. "On the Forgotten Cultural Environment." Yearbook of the Estonian Academy of Sciences I (Tartu 1940), pp. (1940): 221-339.
- Loorits, Oskar. "The Renascence of the Estonian Nation." The Slavonic and East European Review 33, no. 80 (1954): 25-43.
- Loorits, Oskar. "The Stratification of Estonian Folk-Religion." The Slavonic and East European Review 35, no. 85 (1957): 360-378.
