= Enn Tarvel =

Estonian historian (1932–2021)

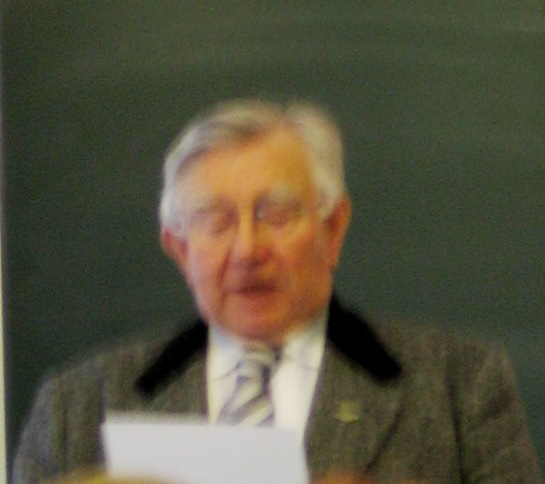
- Born: Enn Treiberg; July 31, 1932; Metsiku, Estonia
- Died: September 22, 2021 (aged 89)
- Occupation: Historian

Enn Tarvel (until 1939 Enn Treiberg; July 31, 1932 – September 22, 2021) was an Estonian historian.

== Early life and education ==
Enn Tarvel was born in the village of Metsiku, where he also grew up, the son of Valdek Tarvel (né Treiberg; 1882–?) and Emilie Tarvel (née Kuulberg; 1896–?). His uncle was the historian Peeter Tarvel. He attended the seven-year school in Annikvere and Rakvere Estonian High School (later renamed Rakvere High School No. 1), where he graduated in 1950 with a silver medal. He then started studying at Tartu State University's Faculty of History and Languages, and he graduated from the university in 1955 in general history.

Tarvel's thesis was on the history of England. He then worked at the Inter-District Local History Museum in Tartu and also gave lectures at Tartu State University. In 1957, he enrolled in a graduate program in Tallinn, and in 1961 he defended his thesis in history on the relations between the Estonian peasantry and the state estates during the Polish era, broadly discussing the entire Polish era in Estonia in the 16th and 17th centuries. The Russian translation of his thesis was published as a separate book in 1965 (with 1964 printed on the title page). In 1962, he began writing a doctoral dissertation on peasant taxation and land use, which he defended in 1971. His dissertation was published as a book in 1972 under the title Adramaa: Eesti talurahva maakasutuse ja maksustuse alused 13.–19. sajandil (Adramaa: The Foundations of Estonian Peasant Land Use and Taxation in the Thirteenth to Nineteenth Centuries).

== Career ==
In 1960, Tarvel started working at the Estonian History Institute of the Academy of Sciences of the Estonian SSR, where was a junior researcher until 1968 and a senior researcher until 1977. From 1978 to 1993, Tarvel was the head of the feudal history department at the History Institute. While working at the History Institute, he served as the supervisor for several historians, including Küllike Kaplinski, Maia Madari, Raivo Palmaru, Teet Veispak, Priit Raudkivi, and Jüri Kivimäe. From 1983 to 1993, Tarvel was a lecturer in economic history at Tallinn Technical University. In 1988, Tarvel became a professor.

From 1992 to 1993, Tarvel was also a professor at the Estonian Academy of Security Sciences. Tarvel was a guest lecturer from 1980 to 1990 with lectures delivered at the University of Helsinki, University of Turku, University of Toronto, and University of Latvia. In 1998, he also lectured at Concordia International University Estonia. From 1993 to 1997, Tarvel was a professor of Baltic history at Stockholm University.

== Research ==
Tarvel studied topics in Estonian history from ancient times to the present day. His main areas of research were political history, agrarian history, and local history.

An important part of Tarvel's research activity was translating, editing, and annotating medieval chronicles about Old Livonia. Among other things, he was the scientific editor and annotator of the Estonian translation of the Livonian Chronicle of Henry, translated by Richard Kleis and published in 1982 (the work was published with additional notes by Tarvel in 1993, 2005, and 2013; the last edition was published unchanged in 2018). He was also the editor and annotator of the Estonian translations of the Livonian Rhymed Chronicle and the chronicle of Dionysius Fabricius.

In 1983, he published the volume Lahemaa ajalugu (History of Lahemaa), and in 2018 a general treatment of Estonian history, Eesti rahva lugu (The Story of the Estonian People). Tarvel was also one of the authors of the general works Eesti talurahva ajalugu (History of the Estonian Peasantry, 1992) and Eesti ajalugu III (History of Estonia 3, 2013). Tarvel also studied the Soviet occupation of Estonia and especially its repressions. Tarvel participated in compiling and editing encyclopedias from the 1960s onward, most recently the TEA Encyclopedia.

== Memberships and awards ==
- 1991: Corresponding member of the Baltic Historical Commission
- 1994: Foreign member of the Royal Gustavus Adolphus Academy
- 1995: Foreign member of the Latvian Academy of Sciences
- 2001: Recipient of the Order of the White Star, Third Class
- 2009: Honorary member of the Learned Estonian Society
- 2014: Estonian National Research Awards
- 2017: Special Grant of the Estonian National Culture Foundation

== Bibliography ==
- 1972: Adramaa: Eesti talurahva maakasutuse ja maksustuse alused 13.–19. sajandil. Tallinn: Eesti Raamat.
- 1982: Henriku Liivimaa kroonika = Heinrici Chronicon Livoniae. Author of the foreword and commentary, translated by Richard Kleis. Tallinn: Eesti Raamat.
- 1983: Lahemaa ajalugu. Tallinn: Eesti Raamat.
- 1992: Eesti talurahva ajalugu. Managing editor (chief editor Juhan Kahk). Tallinn: Olion.
- 1997: An Economic History of the Baltic Countries. With Juhan Kahk. Stockholm: Department of Baltic Studies at Stockholm University.
- 2003: Liivimaa vanem riimkroonika. Editor. Translation and commentary by Urmas Eelmäe. Tallinn: Argo.
- 2006: Documents on the Soviet Military Occupation of Estonia in 1940. With Tõnu-Andrus Tannberg. Tallinn: Estonian Academy Publishers.
- 2010: Dionysius Fabriciuse, Viljandi kiriku praosti Liivimaa ajaloo lühiülevaade neljas osas aastast tuhat ükssada viiskümmend kaheksa kuni aastani 1610 = Dionysii Fabricii, Praepositi pontificii Felinensis, Livonicae historiae compendiosa series in quatuor digesta partes ab anno millesimo centesimo quinquagesimo octavo usque ad annum MDCX. Author of the foreword and comments, and coeditor. Translated by Jaan Unt, edited by Kai Tafenau. Tartu: Johannes Esto Ühing.
- 2013: Eesti ajalugu III. Vene-Liivimaa sõjast Põhjasõjani. Coauthor with Enn Küng, Margus Laidre, Ivar Leimus, Aivar Põldvee, Anti Selart, Marten Seppel, Kai Tafenau, and Ülle Tarkiainen. Tartu: Tartu Ülikooli ajaloo ja arheoloogia instituut.
- 2013: Ajalookimbatused (= Eesti mõttelugu, vol. 109). Edited by Marten Seppel and Urmas Tõnisson. Tartu: Ilmamaa.
- 2018: Eesti rahva lugu. Tallinn: Varrak.
