= Raudkivi =

Family name

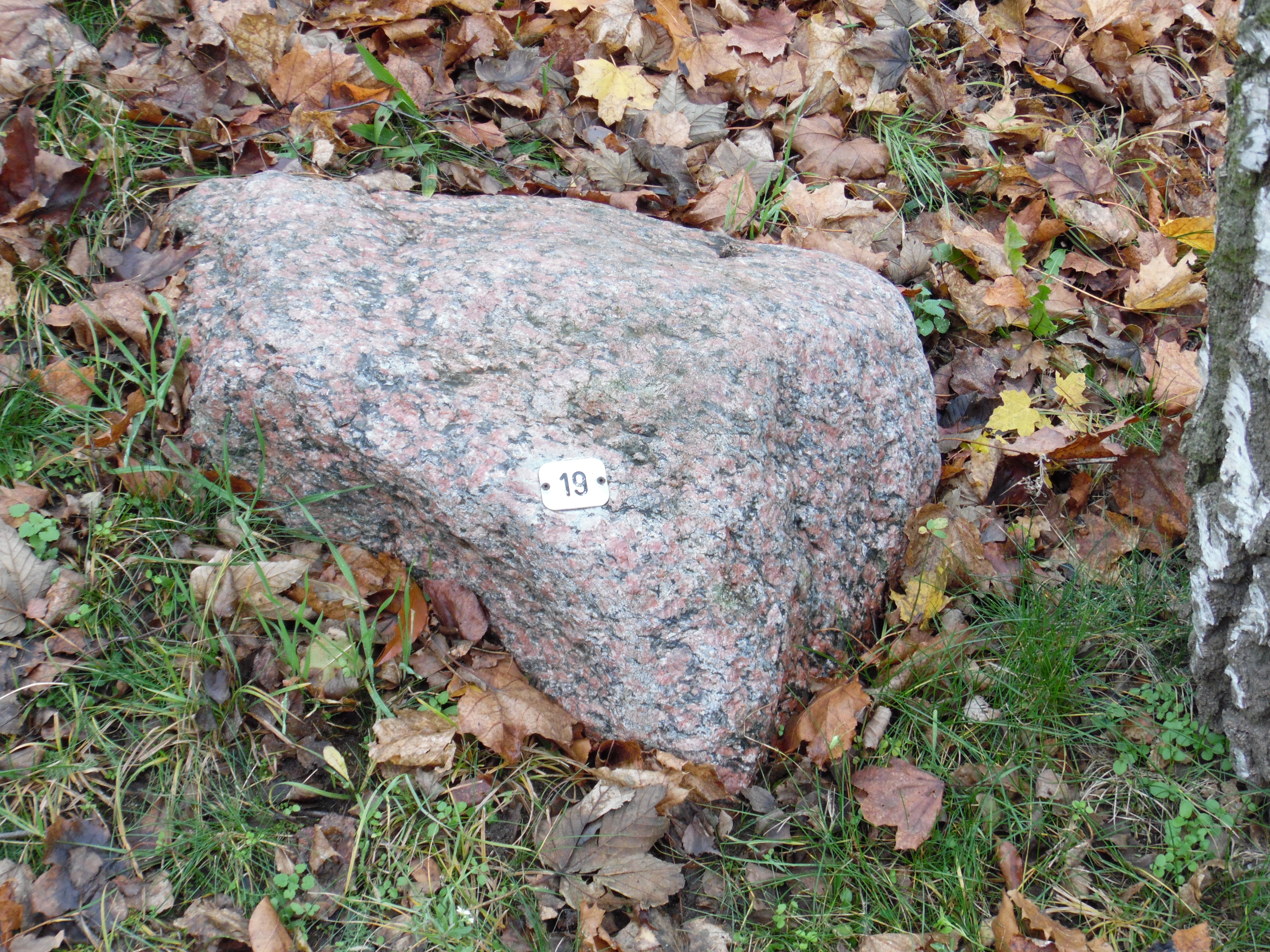

Origin
- Language: Estonian
- Meaning: granite, rubble
- Region of origin: Estonia

Raudkivi is an Estonian language surname meaning granite or rubble; the literal translation of the compound words raud (iron) and kivi (stone). As of 1 January 2023, 65 men and 70 women in Estonia bear the surname Raudkivi. Raudkivi ranks 1480th for men and 1522nd for women in the distribution of surnames in the country. The surname Raudkivi is most common in Järva County, where 5.03 per 10,000 inhabitants of the county bear the surname.

Notable people bearing the surname Raudkivi include:

- Arved Raudkivi (1923–2022), Estonian-New Zealand engineer
- Hilda Raudkivi (1927–1997), Estonian radio journalist
- Priit Raudkivi (1920–1970), Estonian actor
- Priit Raudkivi (historian) (born 1954), Estonian historian
