= Marten Seppel =

Estonian historian

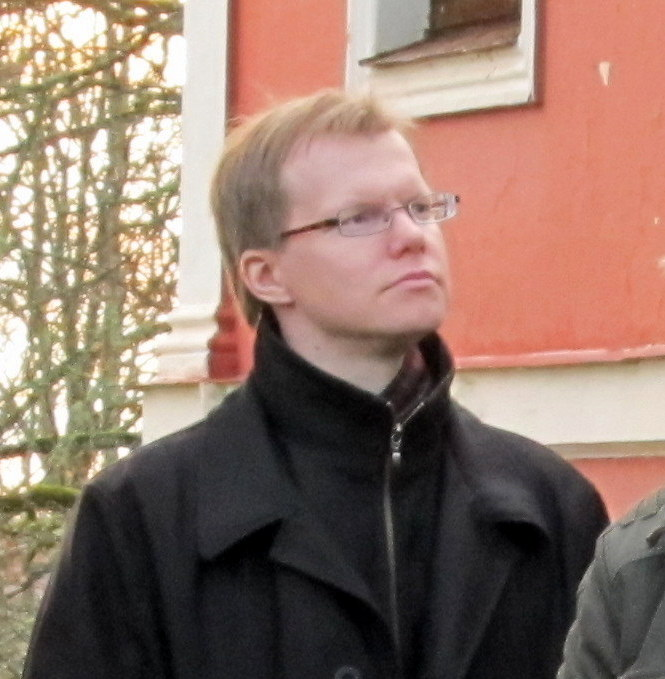
- Born: January 6, 1979 (age 47)
- Occupation: Historian

Marten Seppel (born January 6, 1979) is an Estonian historian specializing in agrarian history.

== Education ==
Seppel graduated from the University of Tartu with a bachelor's degree in 2001. In 2003, he received a master's degree from the University of Cambridge. On June 26, 2008, he defended his doctoral dissertation at the University of Tartu, titled Näljaabi Liivi- ja Eestimaal 17. sajandist 19. sajandi alguseni (Famine Relief in Livonia and Estonia from the Seventeenth Century to the Beginning of the Nineteenth Century). His supervisors were Enn Tarvel and Tiit Rosenberg, and his reviewer was Aleksander Loit. His dissertation won one of the two main prizes in the national competition for student research papers. In 2010, he was a postdoctoral fellow in the Department of Slavic and East European Studies at University College London, and from 2013 to 2014 at Uppsala University.

== Career ==
From 2008 to 2016, Seppel worked at the University of Tartu as a lecturer in general history, and then as an associate professor of early modern history. In 2018, he was a visiting professor at the University of Greifswald.

Seppel has been a member of the Learned Estonian Society since 2006 and has served as a member of its board. He is also a member of the Estonian Academic Historical Society (Estonian: Akadeemiline Ajalooselts), the Economic History Society, and The European Society for the History of Economic Thought.

== Awards and recognitions ==
- 2014: Estonian Historical Literature Annual Award
- 2015: Jüri Uluots Scholarship
- 2018: Alexander von Humboldt Fellowship
- 2022: University of Tartu Badge of Distinction
