= Priit Raudkivi =

Priit Raudkivi may refer to:

- Priit Raudkivi (historian), Estonian historian
- Priit Raudkivi (actor), Estonian actor
