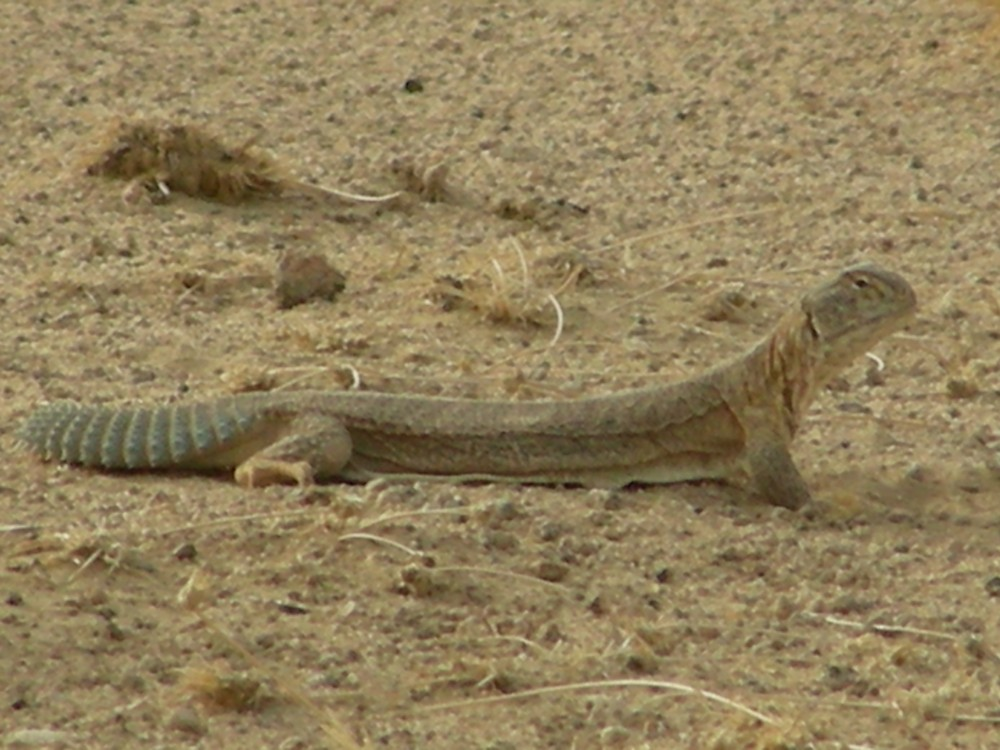

Conservation status
- Vulnerable (IUCN 3.1)
- CITES Appendix II

Scientific classification
- Kingdom: Animalia
- Phylum: Chordata
- Class: Reptilia
- Order: Squamata
- Suborder: Iguania
- Family: Agamidae
- Genus: Saara
- Species: S. hardwickii

Binomial name
- Saara hardwickii (Gray, 1827)

Synonyms
- Uromastix hardwickii Gray, 1827; Uromastyx hardwickii — Das, 2002; Saara hardwickii — Wilms et al., 2009

= Saara hardwickii =

Species of lizard

Saara hardwickii, commonly known as Hardwicke's spiny-tailed lizard or the Indian spiny-tailed lizard is a species of lizard in the family Agamidae. The species is found in patches across the Thar Desert, Kutch, and surrounding arid zones in India and Pakistan. It is mainly herbivorous and lives in numbers in some areas. Since it is found in loose clusters it often attracts predators such as raptors. It is also hunted by local peoples in the belief that the fat extracted from it is an aphrodisiac.

== Taxonomy and etymology ==
Traditionally the species S. hardwickii was placed in the genus Uromastyx, but in 2009 it was moved to the genus Saara together with the closely related species S. asmussi and S. loricata.

The specific name, hardwickii, commemorates English naturalist Thomas Hardwicke who brought illustrations of the species from which J.E. Gray described it.

It has been suggested that Uromastyx sensu lato along with the sister group of Leiolepis may be considered as a distinct family, the Uromastycidae, however this is not widely accepted as the rest of the Agamidae do not form a clear sister group.

== Geographic range ==
The type locality for S. hardwickii is Kanauj district in Uttar Pradesh. It inhabits the dry desert tracts of the northern half of the plains of India into Pakistan. It ranges from Uttar Pradesh in the east to Rajasthan in the West and the Kachchh area of Gujarat. The hot Thar Desert is the stronghold of this species and are found extensively in the Jaisalmer, Bikaner, Barmer and Churu districts in Rajasthan. It is also found in some parts of Madhya Pradesh (Rewa).

=== Local names ===
- Gujarati: sandho
- Hindi-Urdu: sana
- Konkani: gaar
- Punjabi: sanda
- Rajasthani: sanda
- Pashto: khadmai
- Sindhi: patt machi

== Description ==
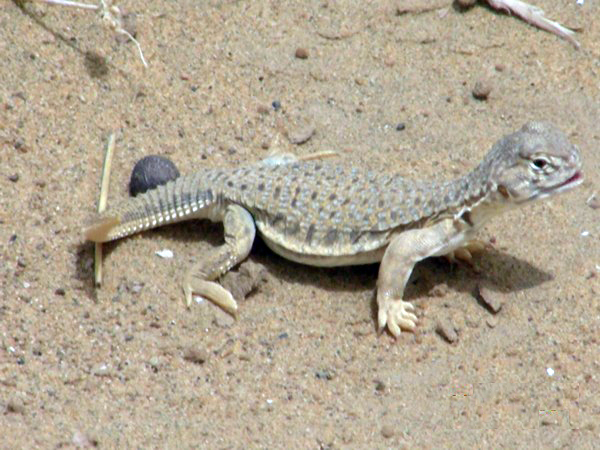
A juvenile spiny-tailed lizard.

Hardwicke's spiny-tailed lizard has a rounded head with a flat snout. It is usually yellowish brown, sandy or olive in colour. It may have black spots and vermiculations and a distinctive black spot on the front of the thigh. It has a dorso-ventrally flattened body with wrinkled skin. Its tail has whorls of spiny scales with large spines on the side. The tail is bluish-grey (in Jaisalmer) to sand-coloured (in Kutch).

The colour of the lizard varies and darker colours are seen during the colder seasons.

=== Sexual dimorphism ===
Males of S. hardwickii range in total length (including tail) from 40 to 49 cm (16 to 19 in), and females 34 to 40 cm (13 to 16 in). The male has a longer tail than the female and pronounced femoral pores.

Photo gallery

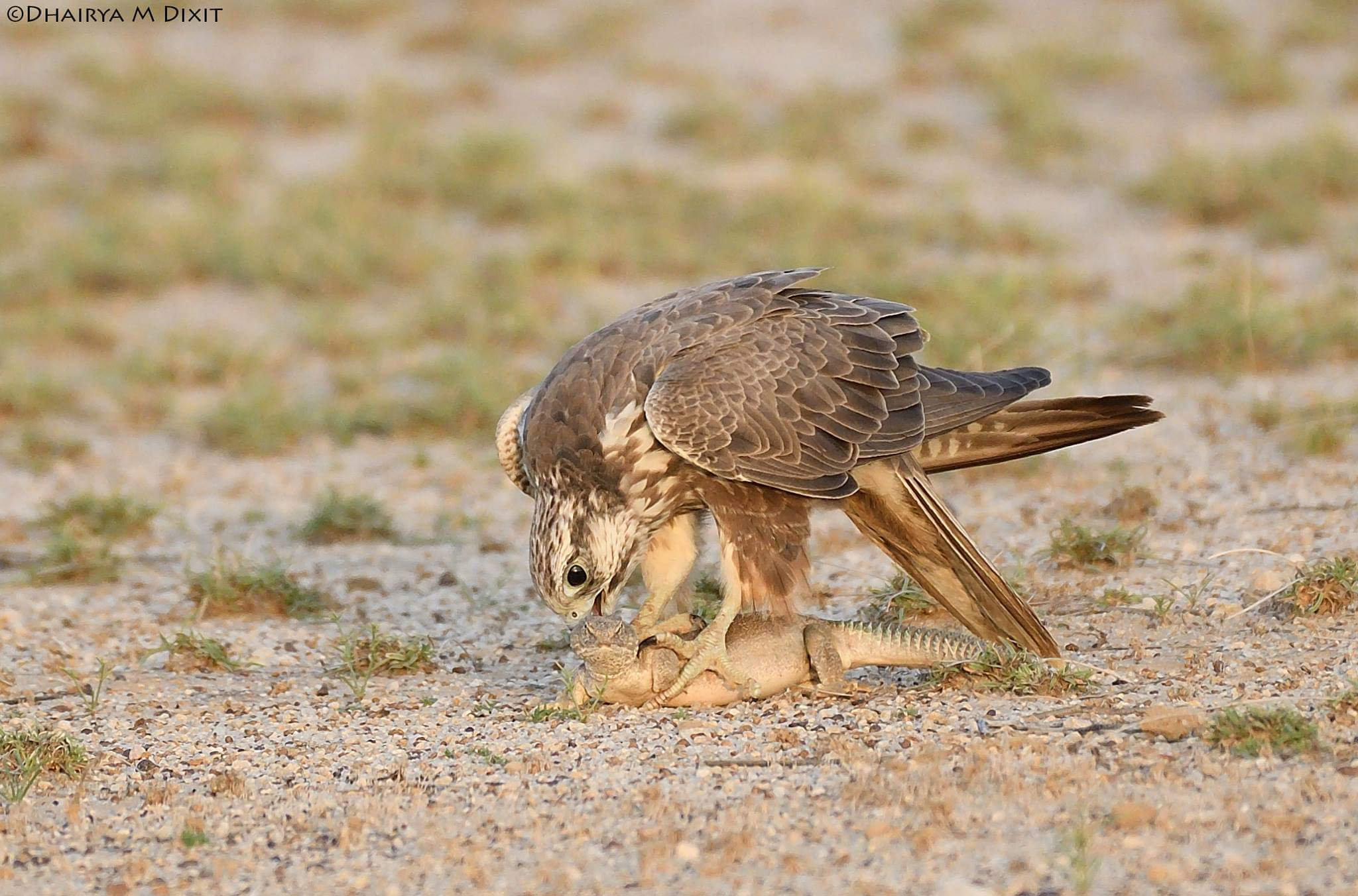
Laggar Falcon just caught a spiny tailed lizard

A juvenile Laggar Falcon had just caught a spiny tailed lizard saara Hardwickii. It is about to start consuming the lizard. These lizards are a huge part of their diet in certain areas of Rajasthan, India.

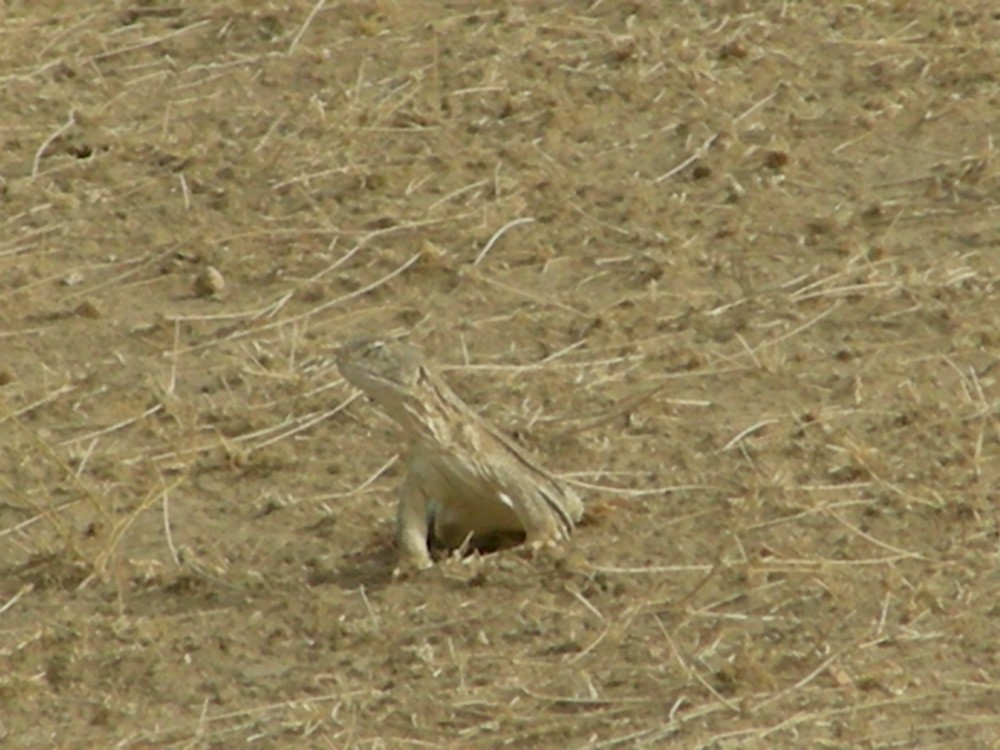
A front view.

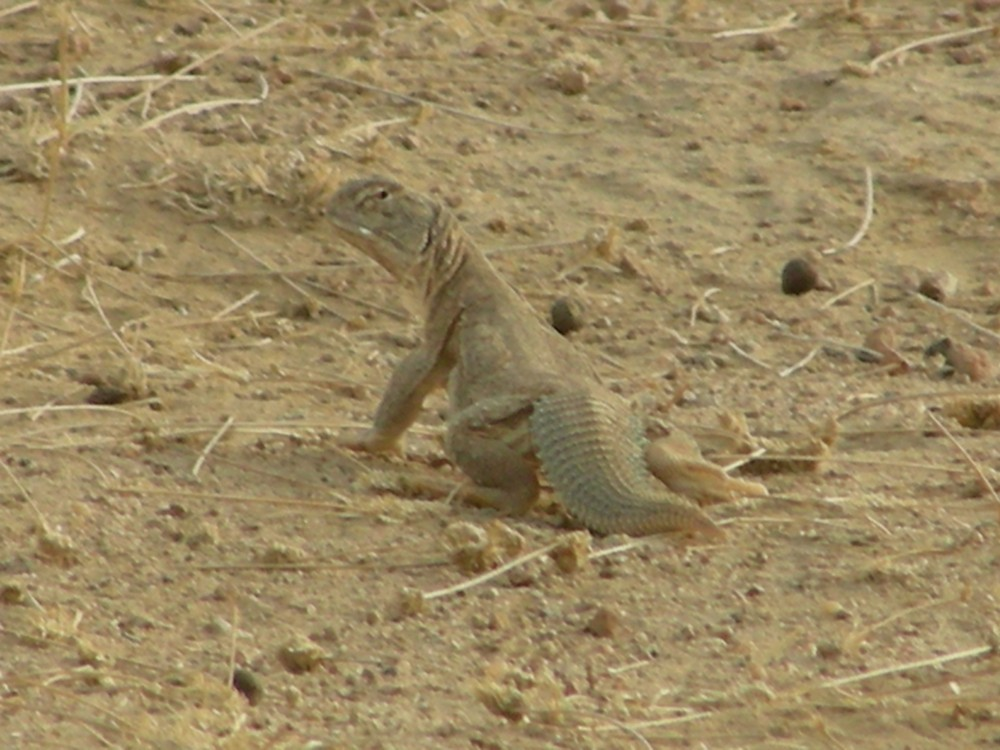
A view from the rear. Note the rounded head and flat snout.

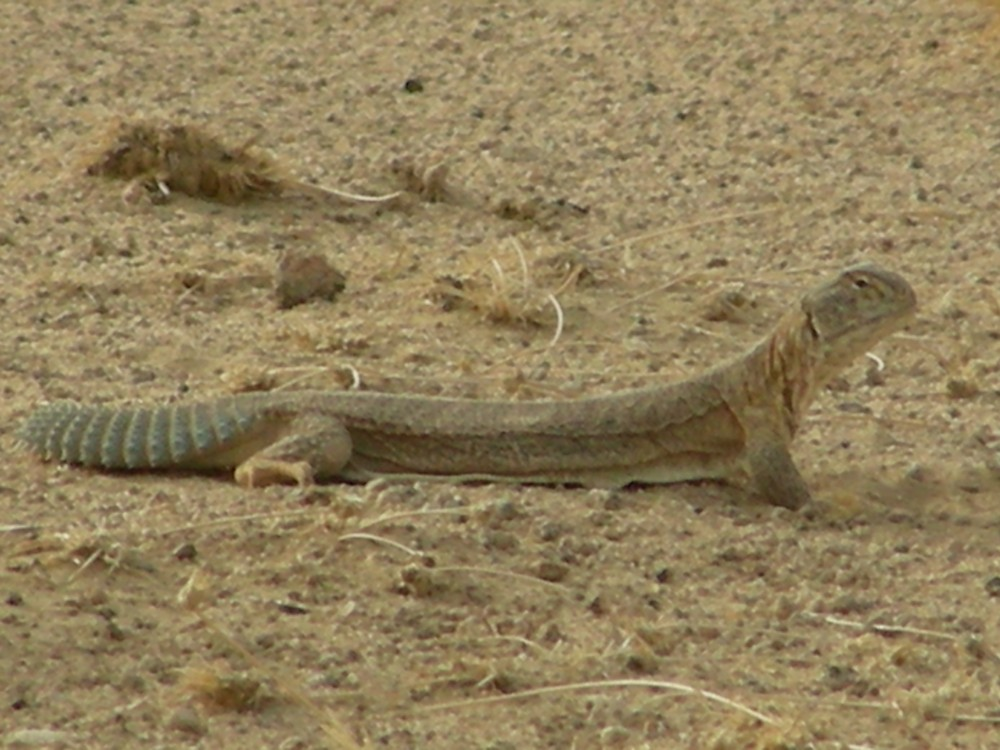
The dorso-ventrally flat body is clearly made out.

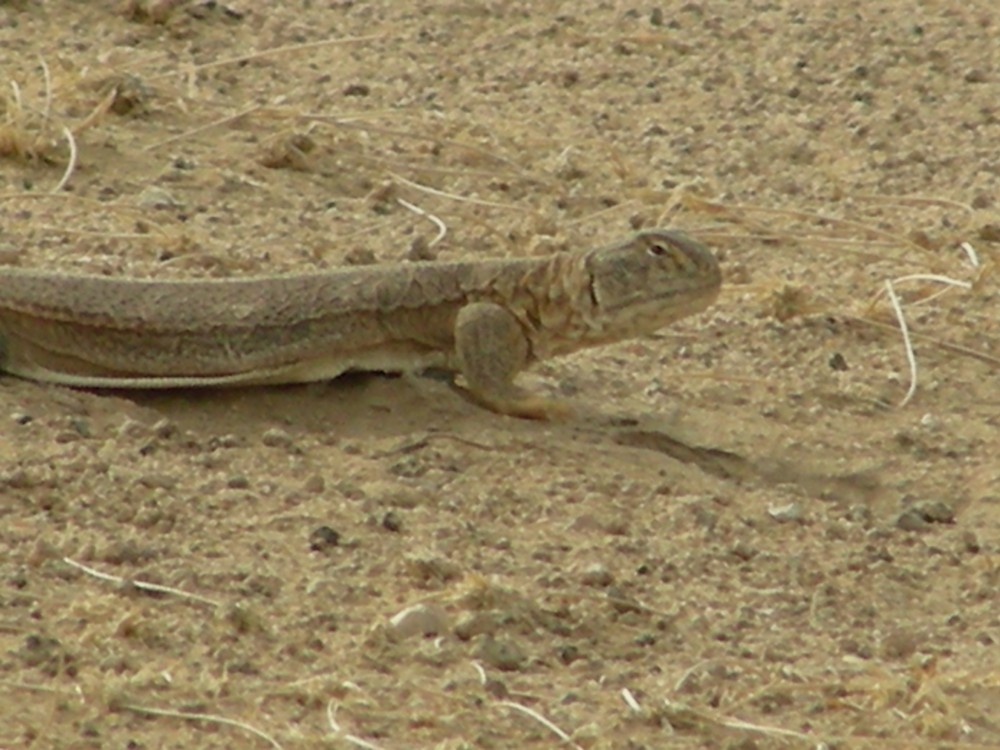
Close up of front half.

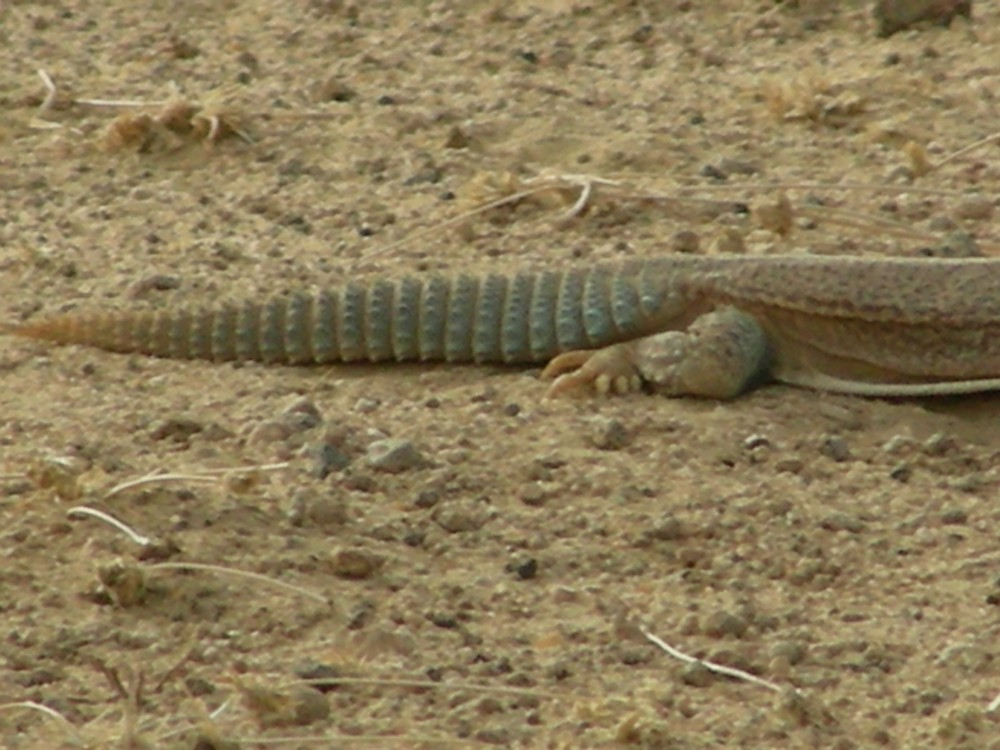
Close up of rear half - note the blue-grey spiny tail and toes on the foot.

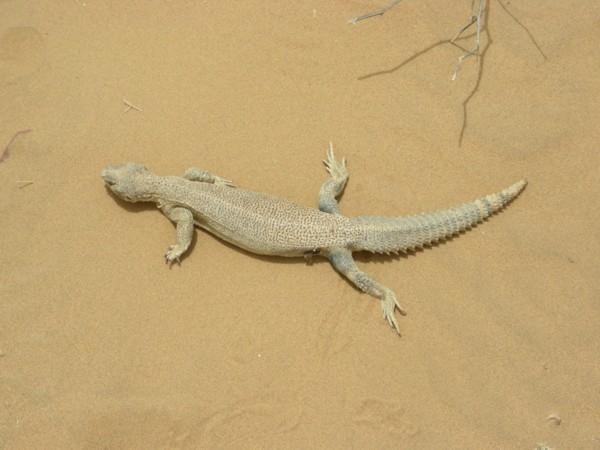
A dead Uromastyx found on the dunes.

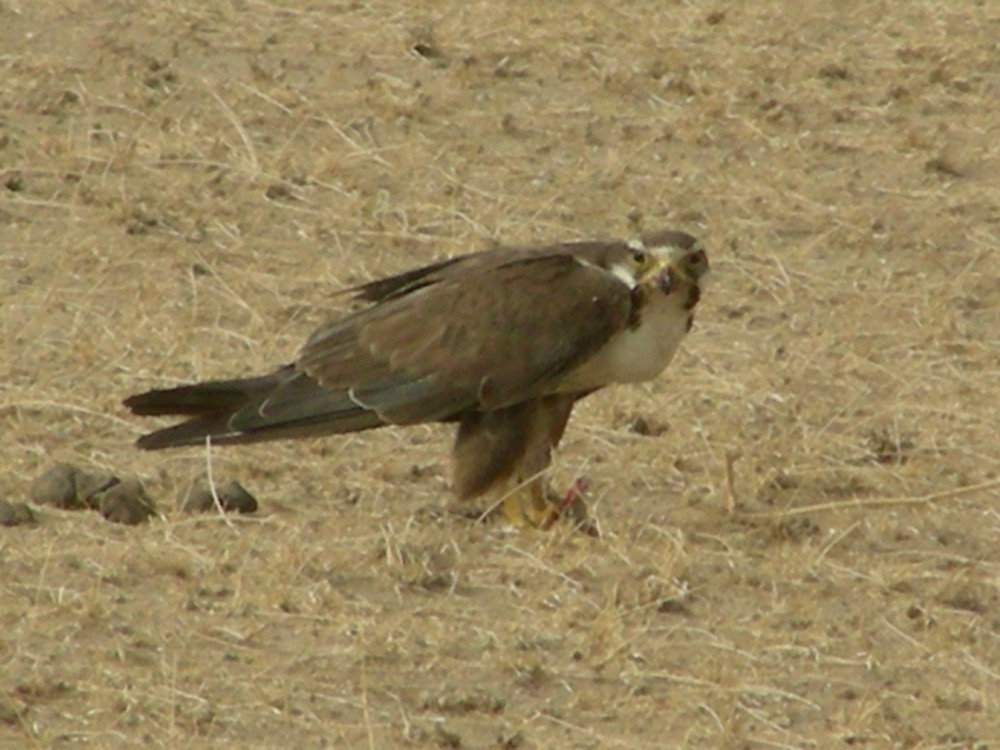
Laggar falcon (Falco jugger) feeding on a spiny-tailed lizard. The lizard was identified from its remains (tail).

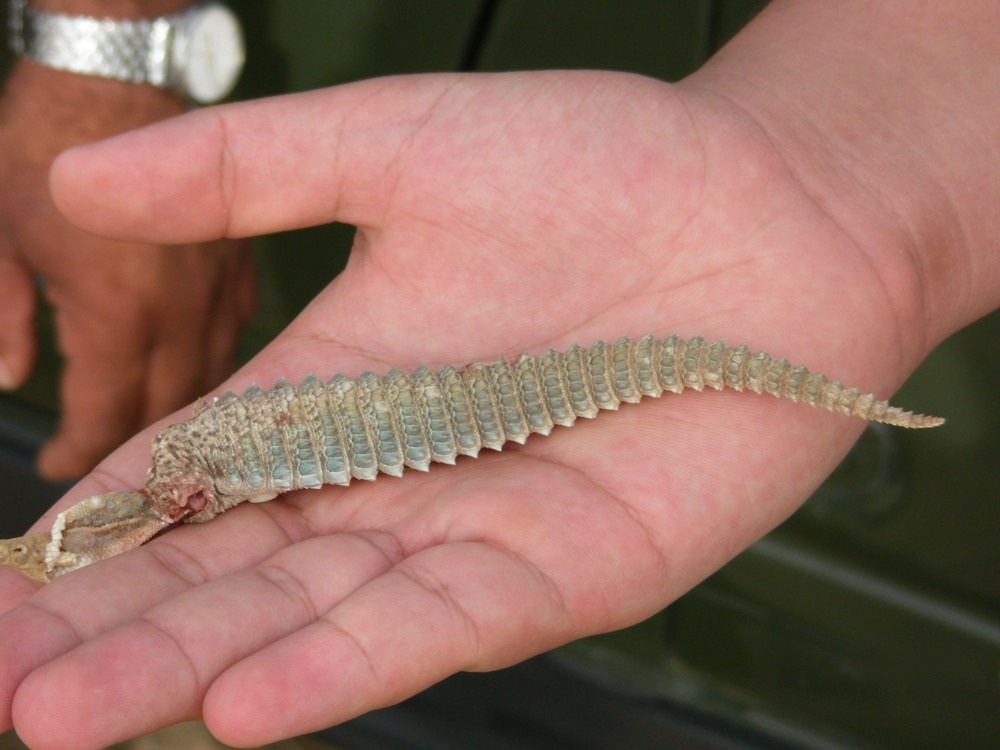
Tail of a spiny-tailed lizard which fell prey to a laggar falcon

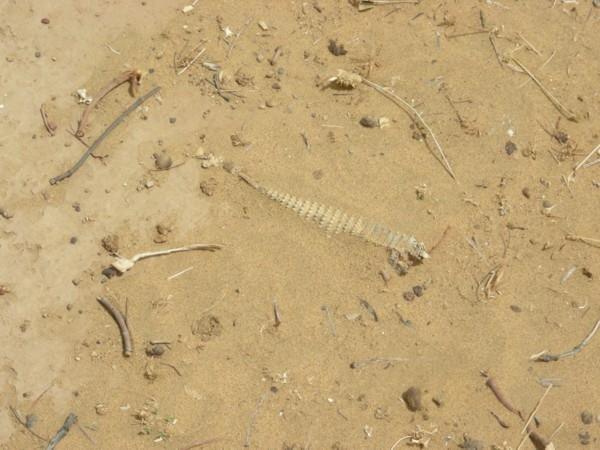
A tail found below the habitual perch of a tawny eagle.

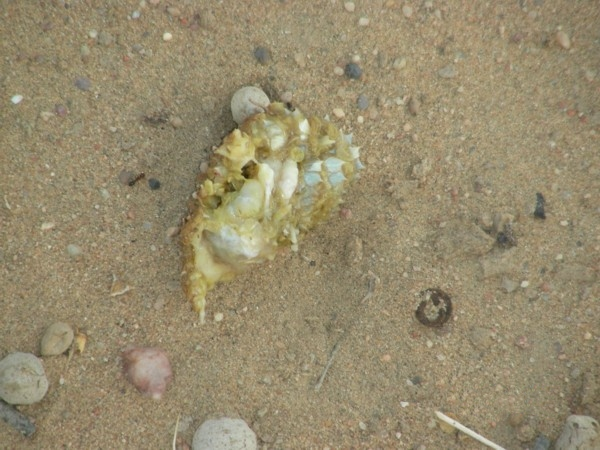
Fresh pellet of a tawny eagle which shows spines of a spiny-tailed which it had eaten. The eagle was filmed ejecting this pellet.

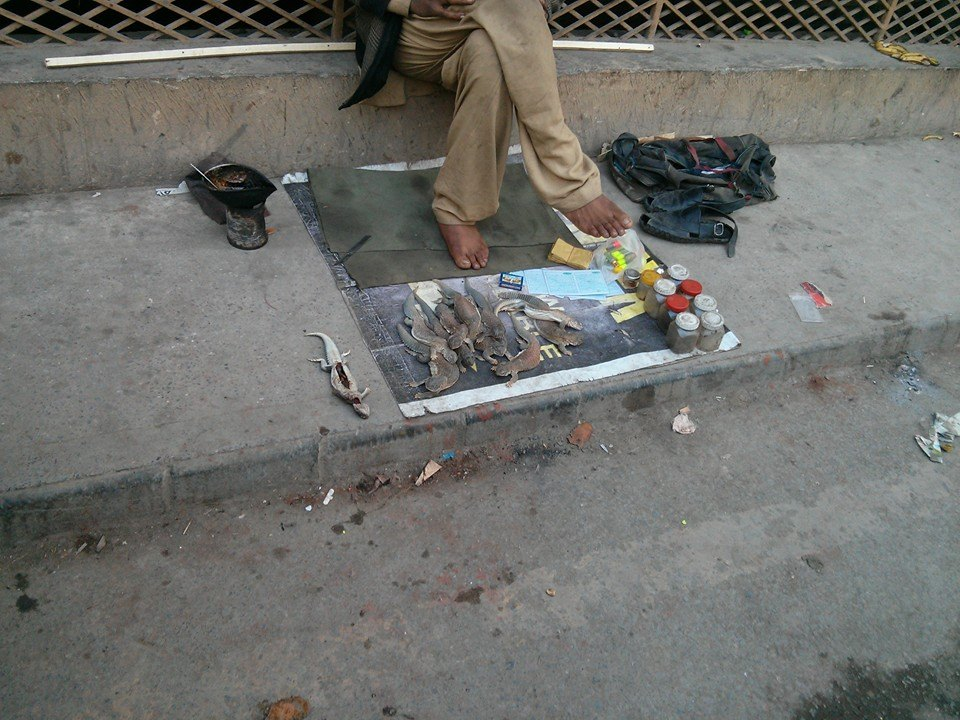
Hawker selling sanda oil in Rawalpindi, Pakistan.

== Habits ==
=== Habitat and distribution ===
Generally found in firm ground habitats rather than pure sand dunes, Hardwicke's spiny-tailed lizard is often found living in colonies, sometimes on the outskirts of villages. It prefers elevated patches of land especially in Kutch where it is invariably found on isolated patches of high ground (called Bets) above the monsoon water level. Also found in Sindh at Kohistan area surrounding Karachi and Thana Bula Khan.

=== Predators ===
Birds of prey are a major predator of the Hardwicke's spiny-tailed lizard in the desert. The saker falcon (Falco cherrug) has been recorded in literature but the tawny eagle (Aquila rapax) and other falcons such as the laggar (Falco jugger) also prey on these lizards. The cattle egret has also been known to prey on it.

=== Burrow ===
Hardwicke's spiny-tailed lizard excavates a sloping zig-zagging or spiralling tunnel of 6 to 8 cm (2.4 to 3.1 in) diameter and over 2 m (6.6 ft) long for itself. The tunnel has an entrance which is flush with the ground and ends in a small chamber. S. hardwickii is solitary in the burrow, but hatchlings may stay with the mother initially.

The lizard basks close to the entrance of its burrow. It is very alert and smoothly slides into its burrow at the first hint of danger. The spiny-tailed hibernates through the winter and emerges in spring. By the time it is ready for hibernation, the lizard puts on long strips of fat on each side of the backbone which presumably enables it to survive the long winter months. Projected agricultural growth would cause considerable declines of Hardwicke's spiny-tailed lizard (>20%) populations.

=== Food ===
Hardwicke's spiny-tailed lizard is largely herbivorous and its teeth are adapted for a plant diet which comprises the flowers and fruits of the kair (Capparis aphylla); the beans of khejri (Prosopis spicigera); the fruit of Salvadora persica, and grass. In locust-breeding areas the spiny tailed lizard has been known to feed on nymphs and adults of the locust.

In summer it tends to forage more in the mornings feeding to a greater extent on insects, and in the monsoons it feeds principally on herbs and grasses.

== Breeding biology ==
S. hardwickii is oviparous. Sexually mature adults of Hardwicke's spiny-tailed lizard breed from June to September. The female lays white, pigeon-sized eggs. Clutch size is 8–15 eggs.

== Economic importance ==
In India S. hardwickii is caught for its meat, about which Malcolm Smith says "... with certain castes of Hindus it is a regular article of diet ... the meat is said to be excellent and white like chicken ... the head and feet are not eaten, but the tail is considered a great delicacy ... the fat of the body is boiled down and the resulting oil is used as an embrocation and also as a cure for impotence."

The fat stored in the tail of the lizard is purported to have medicinal properties and for this reason, this lizard is often illegally collected and sold in various parts of India and Pakistan for folk medicine. It is kept in captivity by the cruel practice of dislocating the backbone.

== Poaching ==
Hardwicke's spiny-tailed lizard is on the verge of extinction in western Rajasthan due to rampant poaching by nomads, who value this reptile both for its meat and as a medicine. During the monsoon, this lizard leaves its burrow and comes out to feed on tender shoots of grass, at which time it falls prey to raptors.
