= Alexander von Middendorff =

Russian zoologist and explorer (1815–1894)

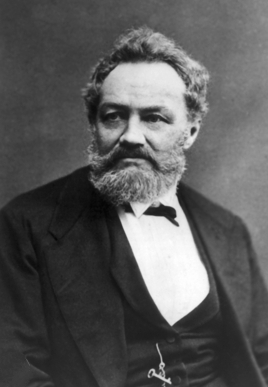
- Middendorff, c. 1880
- Born: 18 August [O.S. 6 August] 1815; Saint Petersburg, Russia
- Died: 24 January [O.S. 12 January] 1894 (aged 78); Hellenorm, Livonia Governorate, Russian Empire
- Resting place: Hellenurme, Estonia
- Citizenship: Russian Empire; German Confederation; German Empire
- Education: Humboldt University of Berlin; University of Erlangen-Nuremberg; University of Vienna; University of Breslau; Imperial University of Dorpat
- Occupations: Zoologist; explorer
- Employer(s): Kiev University; St Petersburg Academy of Sciences

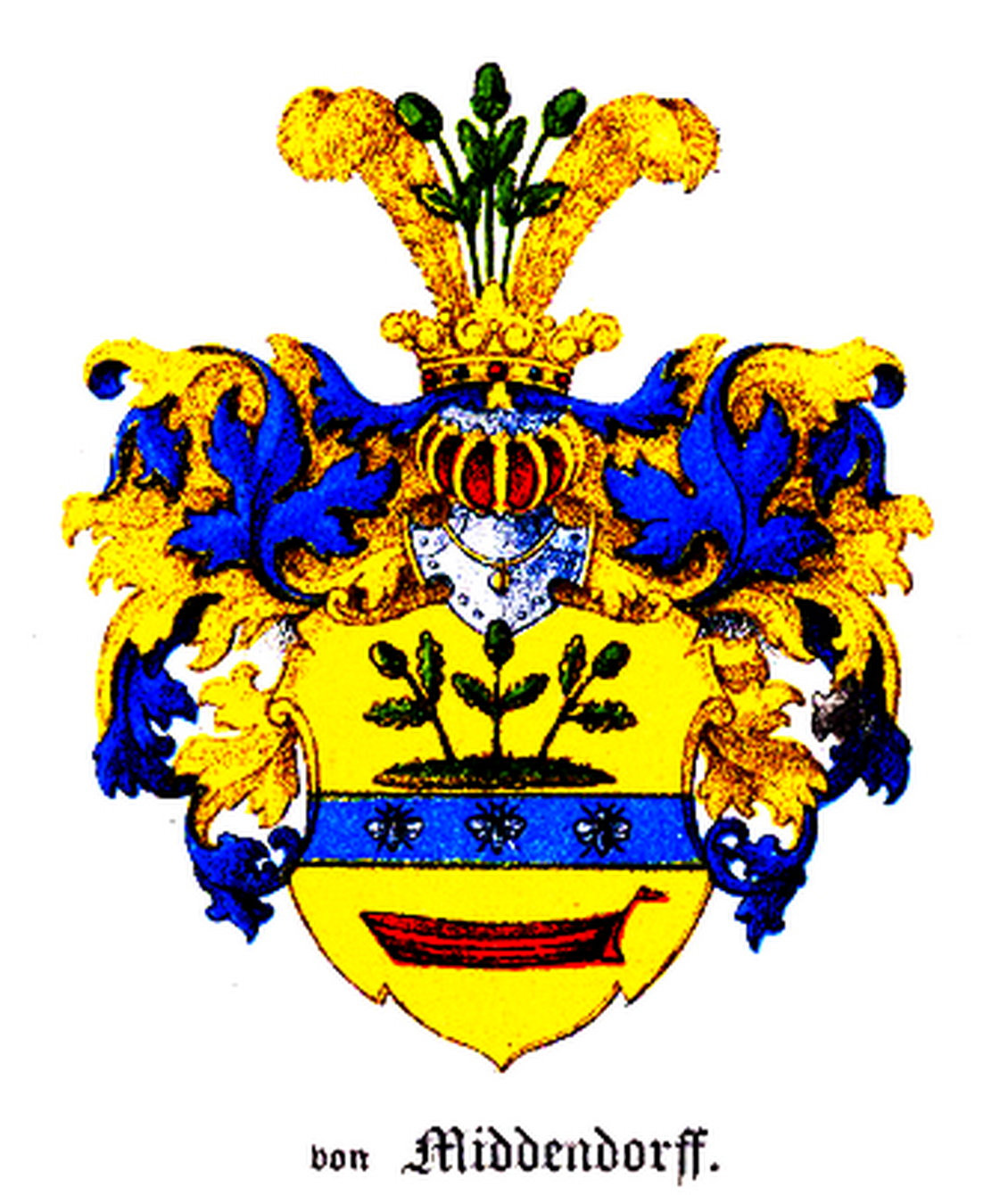
Coat of arms of the Middendorff family, in the Baltic Coat of arms book by Carl Arvid von Klingspor in 1882.

Alexander Theodor von Middendorff (Russian: Алекса́ндр Фёдорович Ми́ддендорф, romanized: Aleksandr Fyodorovich Middendorf; 18 August 1815 – 24 January 1894) was a Russian zoologist and explorer of Baltic German and Estonian extraction. He was known for his expedition in 1843–1845 to the extreme north and east of Siberia, describing the effects of permafrost on the spread of animals and plants.

== Early life ==
Middendorff's mother, Sophia Johanson (1782–1868), the daughter of an Estonian farmer, had been sent to Saint Petersburg for education by her parents. There, she met with the future director of the St. Petersburg Pedagogical Institute, Theodor Johann von Middendorff (1776–1856), whose father was a Baltic German pastor in Karuse, then part of the Governorate of Estonia. As the two young people came from different social ranks and were unable to marry each other, their daughter Anette (b. 1809) and son Alexander were born out of wedlock. Alexander was born on 18 August 1815 in St. Petersburg, but could not be baptized until six months later in the Estonian Lutheran Congregation of St. Petersburg, as the German Lutheran Congregation of St. Petersburg had not agreed to perform the baptism. In the accompanying paperwork, Middendorff's parents registered themselves as a married couple. In order to escape the attention of the public, the mother and son returned to Estonia, where they settled at the Pööravere Mansion. Only in 1824, when the young Middendorff was ready to go to school, was his status legitimized when his parents finally married. (Note: Although his father Theodor was Baltic German, Middendorff's middle name is sometimes spelled as "Theodorowitsch", a German corruption of the Russian patronymic Федорович (Fyodorovich); "-ovich" meaning "the son of" the person (father) whose name precedes it.)

== Education ==
Middendorff received his early education from tutors in Reval and at a gymnasium in Saint Petersburg. From 1832, he pursued a medical degree at the Imperial University of Dorpat where his professors included Georg Friedrich Parrot, Nikolay Ivanovich Pirogov, Hermann Martin Asmuss, and Alexander Friedrich von Hueck. Middendorff graduated in 1837 with a dissertation (written in Latin) on polyps in the bronchi. He then undertook further studies at the Humboldt University of Berlin, University of Erlangen-Nuremberg, University of Vienna, and University of Breslau.

== Explorer and scientist ==
In 1839, under the patronage of Karl Ernst von Baer, he became assistant professor of zoology at Kiev University.

In the summer of 1840, Baer asked Middendorff to join his second expedition to Novaya Zemlya (the first one took place in 1837). Due to stormy conditions, the expedition failed to reach Novaya Zemlya, but Baer and Middendorff explored Russian and Norwegian Lapland, as well as the Barents and White Seas. Middendorff was tasked with crossing on foot the Kola Peninsula and mapping the peninsula from Kola to Kandalaksha while collecting zoological and botanical material.

Baer suggested Middendorff to the St Petersburg Academy of Sciences as leader of a follow-up expedition and supplied extended expedition instructions in 1842/43 in a print-ready typescript. They comprised over 200 pages and a permafrost map of Eurasia. From 1843 to 1845, Middendorff travelled with these instructions, to the Taymyr Peninsula and then along the coast of the Sea of Okhotsk and entered the lower Amur River valley (which at this time was Chinese territory). He published his findings in Reise in den äußersten Norden und Osten Sibiriens (Travels in the extreme north and east of Siberia) in German (1848–1875), which included an account of the effects of permafrost on the spread of animals and plants. He also wrote Die Isepiptesen Russlands (1855), an account of bird migration in Russia, and a monograph on molluscs, Beiträge zu einer Malacozoologia Rossica (1847–1849), in which he coined the term radula.

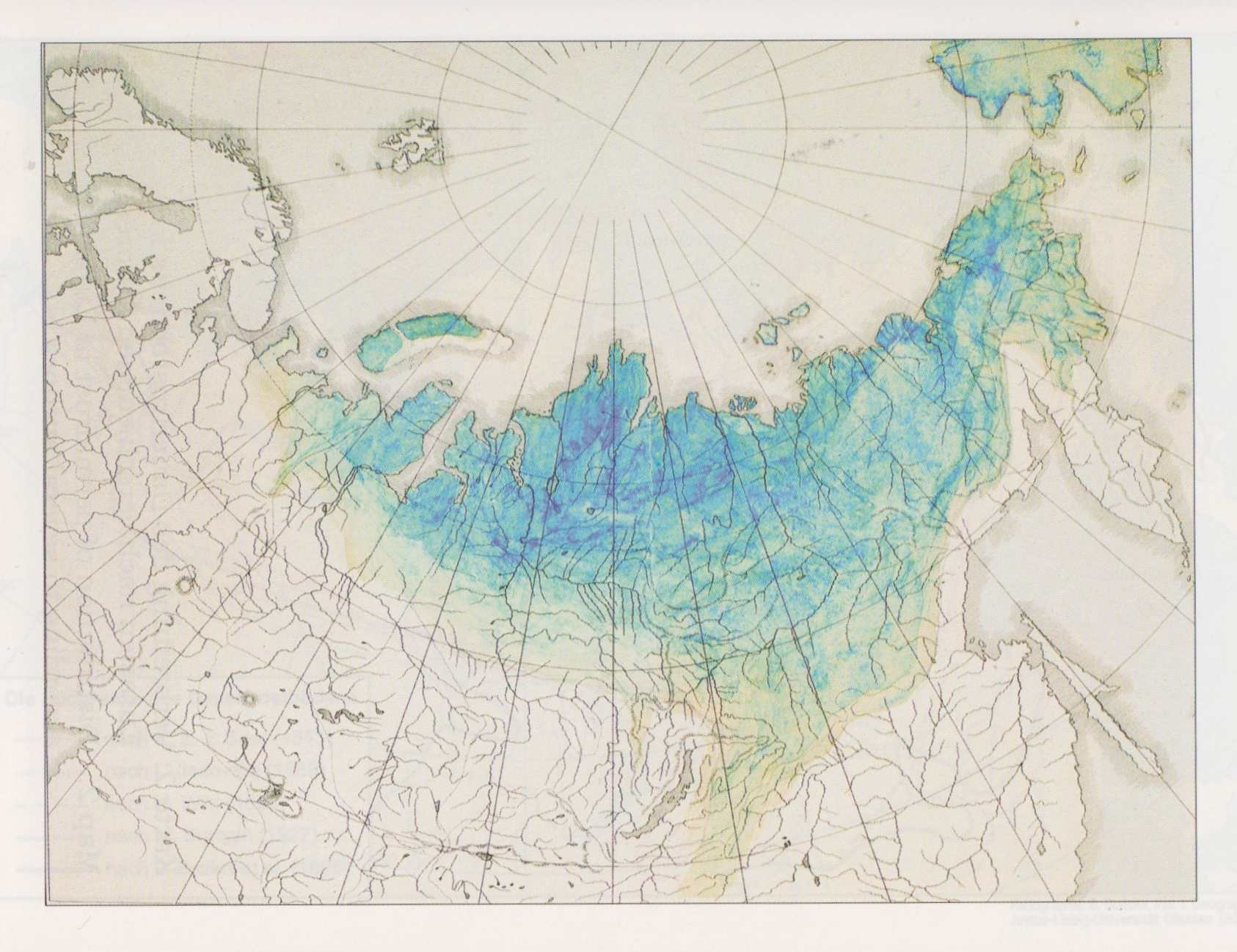
Permafrost occurrences and southern limit of permafrost, from Karl Ernst von Baer's instructions to Middendorff, 1843

Baer's expedition instructions had the German title „Materialien zur Kenntniss des unvergänglichen Boden-Eises in Sibirien“ (=materials for the knowledge of the perennial ground ice in Siberia). Although print-ready in 1843, the text remained lost for more than 150 years. Thus, in 2001, the discovery and annotated publication of the typescript in the library archives of the University of Giessen was a scientific sensation. The full text of the expedition instructions is available online (234 pages). The editor Lorenz King added to the facsimile reprint a preface in English, two colour permafrost maps of Eurasia. The text is introduced with detailed comments and references on additional 66 pages written by the Estonian historian Erki Tammiksaar.

In 1870, Middendorff visited the Baraba steppe and in 1878 the Fergana Valley.

== Personal life and death ==
Middendorf was married to Hedwig. His son Ernst von Middendorff was also an ornithologist.

Middendorf died in 1894 at Hellenorm, Kreis Dorpat, in Governorate of Livonia, Russian Empire (now Valga County, Estonia).

== Legacy ==
Middendorff's grasshopper warbler, Cape Middendorff of Novaya Zemlya, Kodiak bear (Ursus arctos middendorffi), and Middendorff Bay of the Taymyr Peninsula are named after him. He coined the term aufeis.

== See also ==
- List of Baltic German scientists

== Sources ==
- "Миддендорф, Александр Федорович" . Brockhaus and Efron Encyclopedic Dictionary (in Russian). 1906.
