= Tarvel =

Tarvel is an Estonian surname. Notable people with the surname include:

- Enn Tarvel (1932–2021), Estonian historian
- Peeter Tarvel (1894–1953), Estonian politician

== See also ==
- Tervel of Bulgaria, ruler of the First Bulgarian Empire in the 8th century
