= UNT (disambiguation) =

UNT or University of North Texas is a state university in Denton, Texas.

UNT or Unt may refer to:

- Unt (surname), an Estonian-language surname
- Unt (album), a 2024 album by Pinhead Gunpowder
- Un Nuevo Tiempo ("A New Era"), a political party in Venezuela
- National Union for Territories Group (French: groupe Union nationale pour les territoires), a political group in France
- Unión Nacional de Trabajadores de Venezuela, Venezuelan trade union federation
- Union Nationale Tchadienne, a radical Islamic political party in Chad
- Universidad Nacional de Tucumán, a national university in Argentina
- Unt, abbreviation for unniltrium, another name for chemical element 103, Lawrencium
- Upsala Nya Tidning, a Swedish newspaper
