= Õruste =

Village in Estonia

- village
- Location in Estonia
- Coordinates: 57°54′47″N 26°10′54″E
- Country: Estonia
- County: Valga County
- Municipality: Valga Parish

Population (2008)
  - Total: 120

Õruste is a village in Valga Parish, Valga County, in southern Estonia. Between 1992 and 2017 (until the administrative reform of Estonian local governments) the village was located in Õru Parish. It has a population of 120 (as of 2008).

The Tartu–Valga road (part of E264) passes through Õruste. So does the Tartu–Valga railway, but there is no station in Õruste. The nearest stations are in Keeni and Tsirguliina, both about 5 km away.
