= Ledoyom =

Geological term

Ledoyom (Russian: ледоём, IPA: [lʲɪdɐˈjom]) is a term proposed by the Russian geologist Vasily Nekhoroshev for intermontane depressions which might get completely filled by glaciers from the surrounding mountains at the maxima of glaciation.

== Etymology ==
The Russian term “Ledoyom (ледоём)” means “body of ice” by analogy with a “body of water” ("vodoyom").

== Description ==
In the 1930s the Russian geologist V.P. Nekhoroshev marked out intermontane depressions in the Altai which might get completely filled by glaciers from the surrounding mountains at the maxima of glaciation. He called such depressions "ledoyoms". Ledoyoms produced large valley glaciers within outlet runoff valleys from the depressions at culmination stages of their development. Diagnostic marks of the so-called classical ledoyoms are moraines, eskers and kames on the bottoms of the corresponding depressions.

In the 1980s and 1990s the development of the idea by Russian geologist Alexei Rudoy of glacier-dammed lakes which used to fill most of the inter-montane basins of the mountain belt of Siberia, the depressions of Teletskoye and Baikal lakes including, took place. It also became clear that many depressions, even very large ones, had been already occupied by dammed water basins by the time when the glaciers of the mountain frame moved forward into them. Thus, mountain glaciers turned into original “shelf” glaciers and armored completely the surface of the glacier-dammed lake joining together floating on the surface. That is the way the so-called “captured lakes” came to exist.

At maximum lowering of the snow-line (in the Altai and the Sayan its depression gave about 1200 m in late pleistocene) some of the lakes (Chuya, Kuray, Uymon and others) began functioning in an under-ice regime because they never got free from ice for thousands of years. Such lakes turned into ice bodies of the “aufeis” type. They consisted of a thick lens of lake water, which was covered by lake ice, aufeis and glacier ice, and by snow-firn sequence, too. “Aufeis” ledoyoms became independent centers of glaciation with subradial ice outlets. Possible analogies of such an evolution mechanism and pre-glacial lakes are thick water lenses under a 3–4 kilometer-thick unit of the glacier cover at the sites of Dome B and Dome Charlie and the Vostok Station in Eastern Antarctica.

Thus, depending on the intermontane depression topography, the values, of the snow-line depression and of the glaciation energy, the interrelation of the glaciers and the ice-dammed lakes in the mountains of south of Western Siberia could develop according to the following scenarios:

1. A ledoyom only (no ice-dammed lake). In such cases some glacial and water-glacial relief forms and sediments would remain in the basins
2. A water body and a ledoyom together (the stage of “catch lakes”). Certain forms of “dead ice” may remain in the basins, as well as intraglacial water-ice forms – eskers and kames which were projected onto the bottom lake deposits when the “shelf” ice descended
3. “Aufeis” ledoyoms
4. An ice-dammed lake only.

Under different extensions of the glacier at different time periods, one and the same basin could have undergone different sequences of the lake-glacier events.
