= Friedrich Robert Faehlmann =

Estonian writer

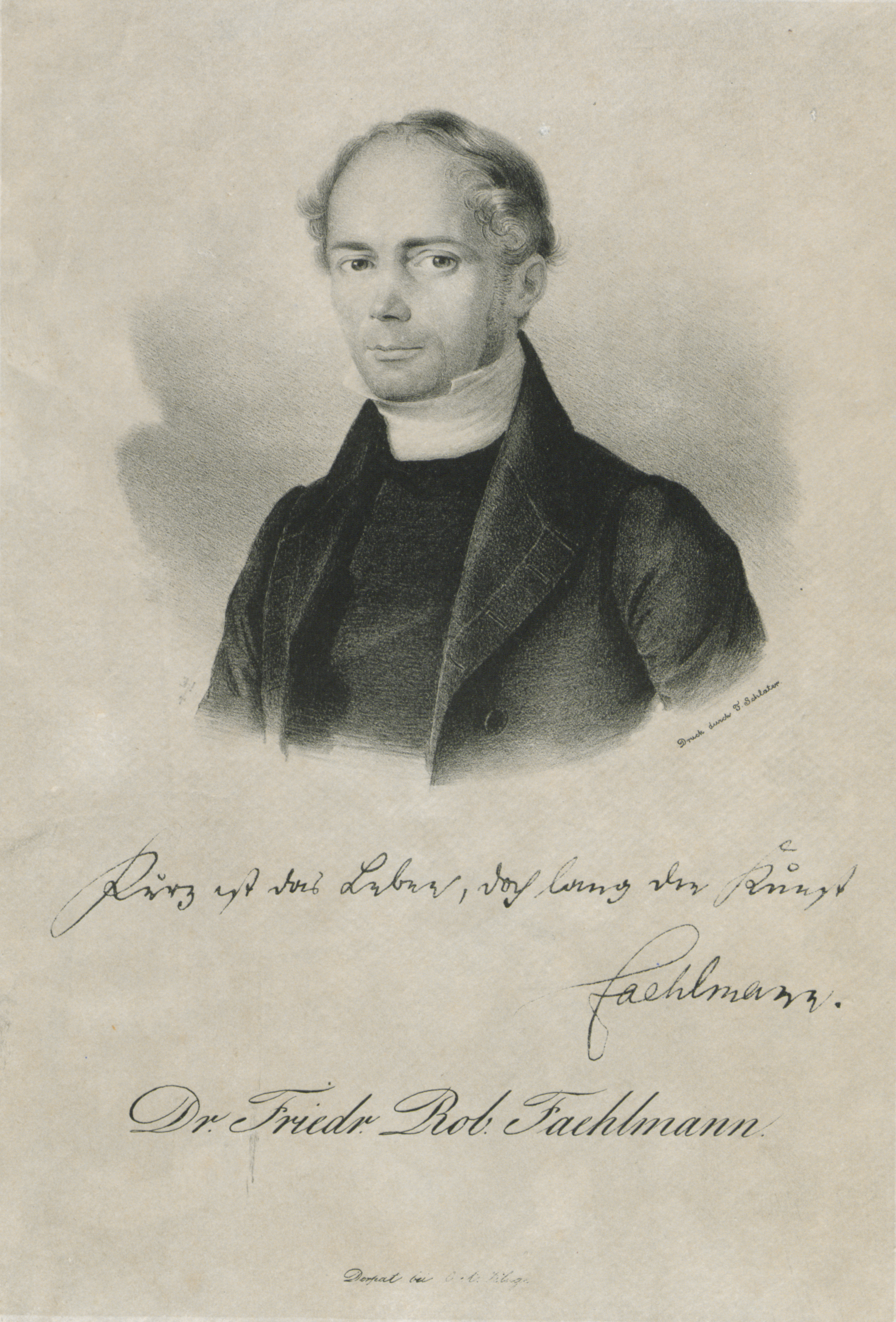
Friedrich R. Faehlmann. Lithograph by Eduard Hau (1838)

Friedrich Robert Faehlmann (Fählmann) (31 December 1798 in Ao, Kreis Jerwen, Governorate of Estonia – 22 April 1850 in Tartu) was an Estonian writer, medical doctor and philologist. He was a co-founder of the Learned Estonian Society and its chairman (1843-1850).

Friedrich Robert Faehlmann was born in 1798 in the Ao manor (now in Väike-Maarja Parish, Estonia) where his father was the estate manager. In 1825, he graduated from the medical department of the University of Tartu (Dorpat). In 1827, he earned the Doctor of Medicine degree and become a practicing physician in Tartu. In addition, he worked as an Estonian language lecturer at the university in 1842–1850.

In the 1820s he started to research Estonian culture, and in 1838 he became a co-founder of the Learned Estonian Society at the university.

Faehlmann brought attention to Estonian folklore, notably he recorded a number of tales about Kalevipoeg. After his death, another Estophile, Friedrich Reinhold Kreutzwald (1803–1882) compiled the Kalevipoeg legends into what became the Estonian national epic.

In 1840, Faehlmann's story "Koit ja Hämarik" (Dawn and Dusk) was first published.

He died at April 22, 1850 of tuberculosis in Tartu.

== Publications ==
- M.D. dissertation "Observationes inflammationum occultiorum" (1827)
- "Versuch einer neuen Anordnung der Conjunctionen in der estnischen Sprache" (1842)
- "Ueber die Declination der estnischen Nomina" (1844)
- "Die Ruhrepidemie in Dorpat im Herbst 1846" (1846)
- "Verhandlungen der Gelehrten estnischen Gesellschaft" (1852)

== In memoriam ==
In 1930 a bronze bust (sculptor V. Mellik) was installed in Tartu.

In 1938, he was featured on 5 and 25 sent postage stamps issued by Estonia.

In 1998 the Estonian Post issued a postmark in the commemoration of the 200th anniversary of his birth.
