= Metsiku =

Village in Estonia

Coordinates: 59°29′N 26°09′E

- Village
- Interactive map of Metsiku
- Country: Estonia
- County: Lääne-Viru County
- Parish: Haljala Parish

Population
  - Total: 26
- Time zone: UTC+2 (EET)
  - Summer (DST): UTC+3 (EEST)

Metsiku is a village in Haljala Parish, Lääne-Viru County, in northern Estonia.

== History ==
The village arose on the territory of Metsiku Manor, part of Haljala Parish (Kirchspiel Haljall). In 1872, Danel Pruhl established the first library to serve Estonian peasants.

== Name ==
The village was originally called Koduvere (German: Koddofer), and it was attested in written sources as Kottewæræ in 1241 and Koddeuer in 1524. The philologist Lauri Kettunen connected this name to the word koda 'house, building', whereas Paul Johansen suggested that it is derived from a personal name (Finnish Kotia, Estonian Kotti). The name Metsiku was applied to the village in the 20th century, referring to Metsiku Manor after its dissolution. Metsiku was attested in written sources in the personal name Hans Lode von Metzkus in 1504 and as Metzkuß in 1524. According to Enn Tarvel, the name Metsiku comes from the adjective metsik 'wild', referring to the uncultivated land where the manor was established.

== Notable people ==
Notable people that were born or lived in Metsiku include the following:

- Enn Tarvel (1932–2021), historian
- Peeter Tarvel (1894–1953), politician and historian
