= Ao, Estonia =

Village in Estonia

Ao
- Village
- Location within Estonia
- Coordinates: 59°00′00″N 26°12′07″E
- Country: Estonia
- County: Lääne-Viru County
- Parish: Väike-Maarja Parish
- Time zone: UTC+2 (EET)
  - Summer (DST): UTC+3 (EEST)

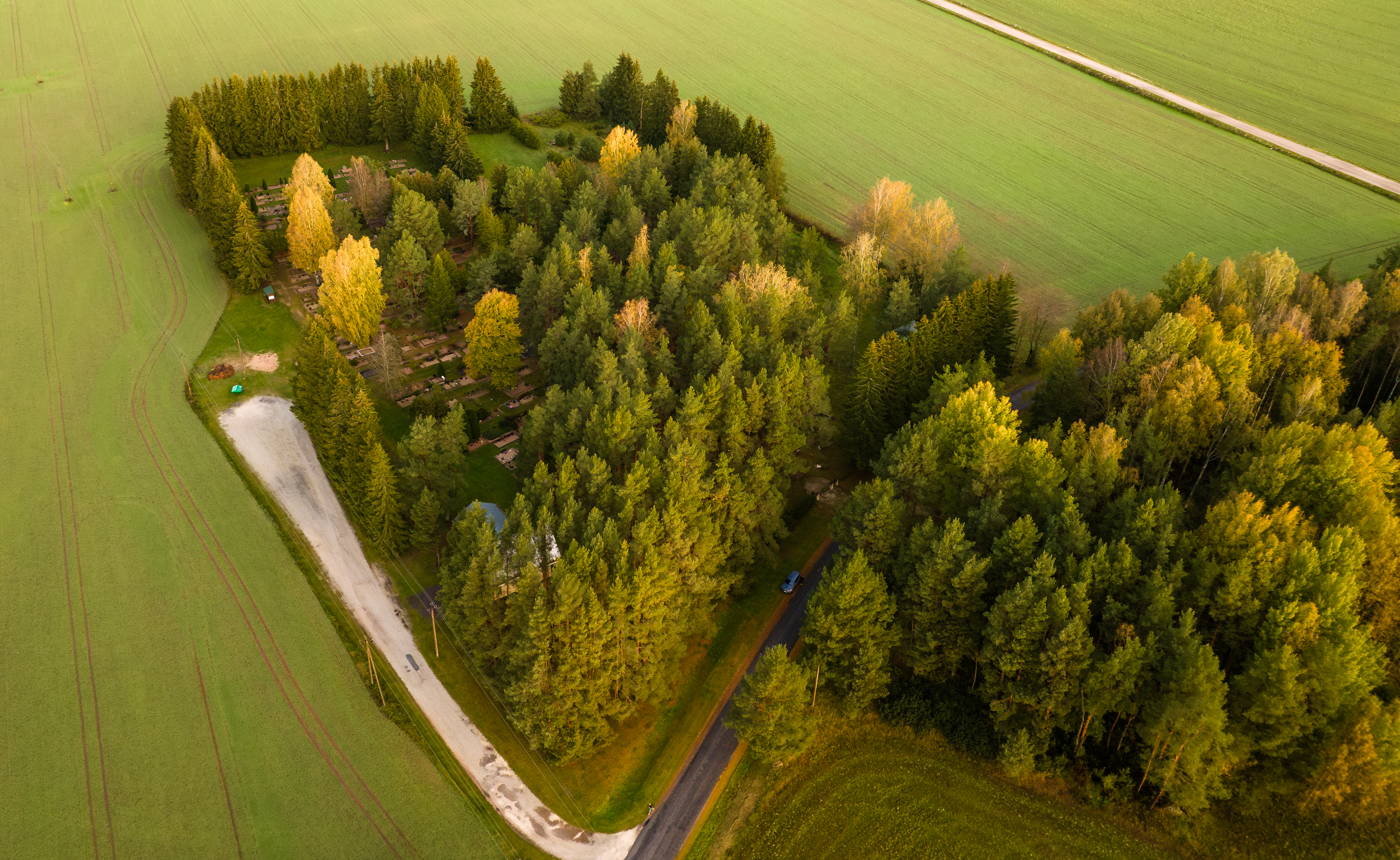

Ao is a village in Väike-Maarja Parish, Lääne-Viru County, in northeastern Estonia.

== Name ==
Ao was attested in historical sources as Hackeueyde in 1536, Hackeweide in 1559, and Ao in 1732. The name comes from the noun hagu (genitive: hao) 'stick, twig, small branch'.

== Notable people ==
Notable people that were born or lived in Ao include the following:

- Friedrich Robert Faehlmann (1798–1850), philologist and physician, born in Ao Manor
