= Unt (surname) =

Family name

Origin
- Language: Estonian
- Region of origin: Estonia

Other names
- Variant form: Hunt

Unt is an Estonian surname, ultimately from an old Finno-Ugric topographic stem, and because of its abundance in place names throughout areas of Finno-Ugric speaking peoples, is believed to have meant something hydronymically essential. In many cases, the name may be a corruption of the Estonian word hunt 'wolf', which is a rather common Estonian surname.

As of 1 January 2021, 372 men and 414 women in Estonia have the surname Unt. Unt is ranked as the 110th most common surname for men in Estonia, and the 108th most common surname for Estonian women. The surname Unt is the most common in Valga County, where 21.79 per 10,000 inhabitants of the county bear the surname.

Notable people bearing the surname Unt include:

- Aime Unt (1941–2024), stage designer
- Anto Unt (born 1955), philosopher
- Henn Unt (1903–1986), Lutheran clergyman
- Jaan Unt (1894–1974), military lieutenant colonel
- Jaan Unt (1947–2012), classical philologist, translator and literary scholar
- Johan Unt (1876–1930), military major general
- Katariina Unt (born 1971), actress
- Kersti Unt (born 1950), literary scholar and translator
- Liina Unt (born 1977), stage designer
- Maksim Unt (1898–1941), politician
- Marja Unt (born 1982), literary scholar and translator
- Mati Unt (1944–2005), writer, essayist and theatre director
- Riho Unt (born 1956), animated film director, screenwriter, artist
- Väino Unt (1932–2015), physicist
