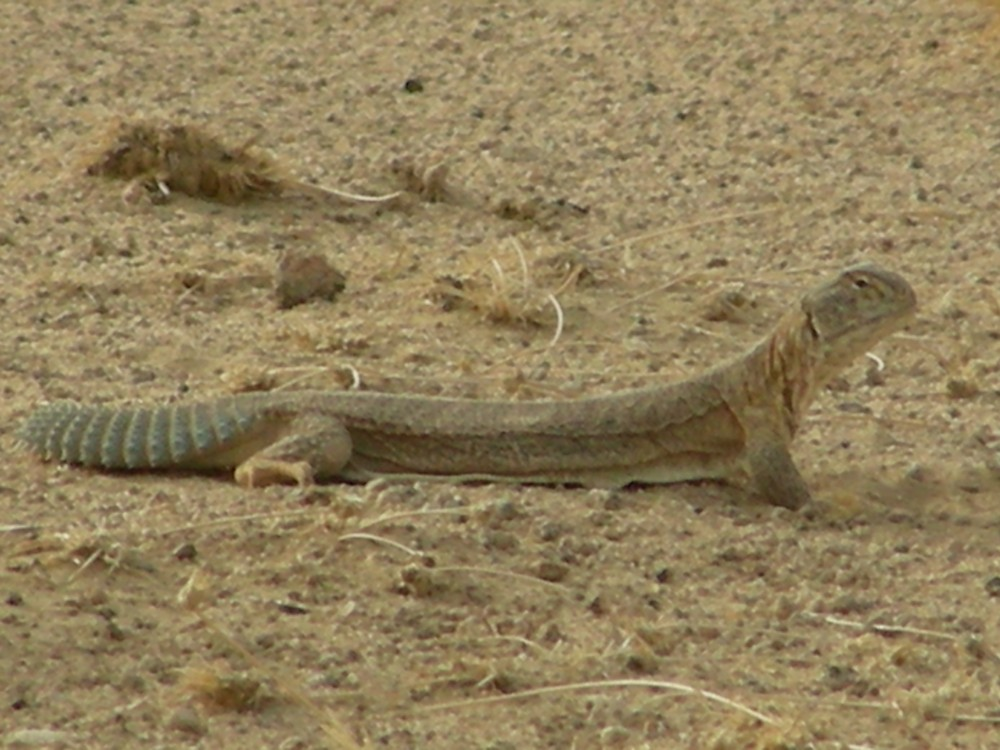
- Saara hardwickii

Scientific classification
- Kingdom: Animalia
- Phylum: Chordata
- Class: Reptilia
- Order: Squamata
- Suborder: Iguania
- Family: Agamidae
- Subfamily: Uromasticinae
- Genus: Saara; Gray, 1845

Type species
- Uromastix hardwickii

Species
- Three, see text

= Saara (lizard) =

Genus of lizards

Saara is a genus of lizards in the subfamily Uromasticinae of the family Agamidae. The genus is endemic to Asia.

== Taxonomy ==
Until 2009, the member species of the genus Saara were generally included in the genus Uromastyx.

== Geographic range and habitat ==
Saara species are native to dry habitats in southwestern Asia, ranging from Iran to northwestern India.

== Species ==
Image	Scientific name	Common name	Distribution
	Saara asmussi (Strauch, 1863)	Iranian mastigure, Persian spiny-tailed lizard	Afghanistan, southern Iran, and Pakistan.
	Saara hardwickii (Gray, 1827)	Hardwicke's spiny-tailed lizard, Indian spiny-tailed lizard	India and Pakistan.
	Saara loricata (Blanford, 1874)	Iraqi mastigure, Iraqi spiny-tailed lizard	Iraq and Iran

Nota bene: A binomial authority in parentheses indicates that the species was originally described in a genus other than Saara.
