= Ernst von Middendorff =

Baltic ornithologist (1851–1916)

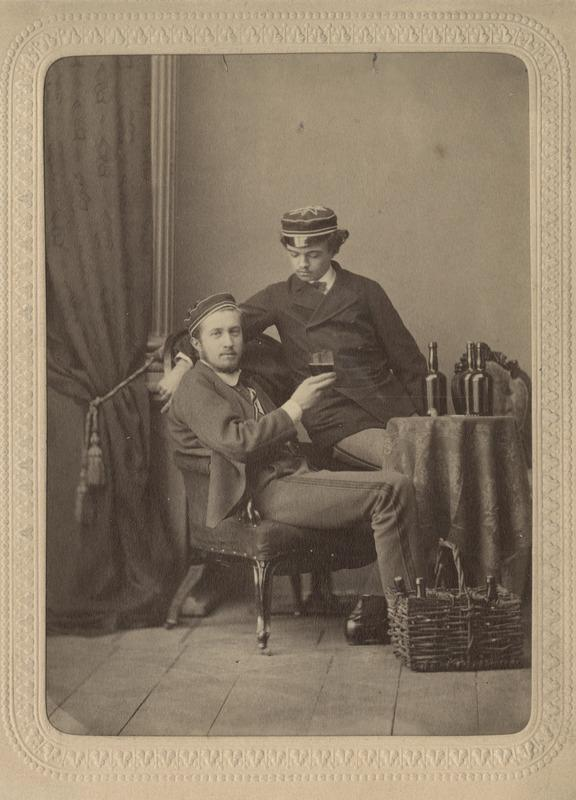
Ernst von Middendorff in 1872 with Eduard Liborius Fürchtegott von Bergmann

Ernst von Middendorff (10 January 1851 – 6 April 1916), the son of the Baltic explorer Alexander von Middendorf, was an agronomist and ornithologist who made an extensive collection of birds from across Europe.

Von Middendorff was born in St. Petersburg to Alexander and Hedwig. He was educated privately, at the Wiedemann Grammar School in St Petersburg and then at Dorpat. He began to apprentice in farming on the family estate in Hellenorm. He then studied chemistry and economics at the University of Dorpat. He received a doctorate in agronomy in 1875. He was interested in natural history from an early age and joined an expedition in the Arctic Circle along with his father. He returned and managed the estates of his father at Samhof, Pörrafer, and Hellenorm. He hunted specimens of birds across the Baltic region, also obtaining skins through others. He had a private collection of nearly 4000 skins but these were distributed across museums in Europe. He served as a vice president of the second international ornithological congress held at Budapest.
