= Hermann Martin Asmuss =

Baltic-German paleozoologist

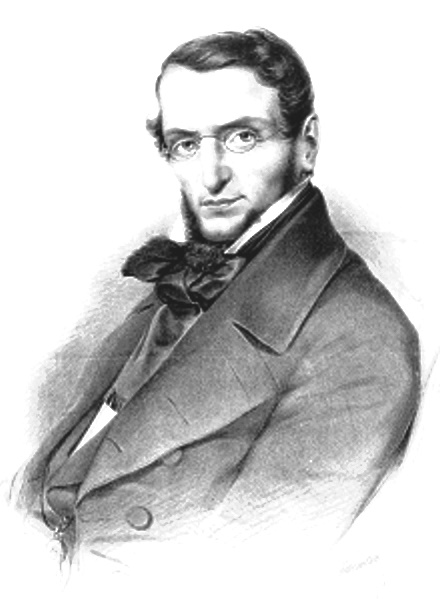
Hermann Martin Asmuss; lithograph by Georg Friedrich Schlater (1848)

Hermann Martin Asmuss (31 May 1812 – 6 December 1859) was a Baltic German paleozoologist and professor at the Imperial University of Dorpat.

== Life ==
Asmuss was born in Dorpat, present-day Estonia, the son of the writer Johann Martin Asmuss and Christine Luise Asmuss, née Luhde. He studied at the Imperial University of Dorpat and received his doctorate from the Albertus University of Königsberg. In 1857 he was made a full professor and director of the Cabinet of Natural History at the University of Tartu. His main field of work was in classifying Hemiptera. The lizard species Saara asmussi is named after him.

In 1856, he published Das vollkommenste Hautskelet der bisher bekannten Thierreihe.
