= Tsirguliina =

Borough in Estonia

- Small borough
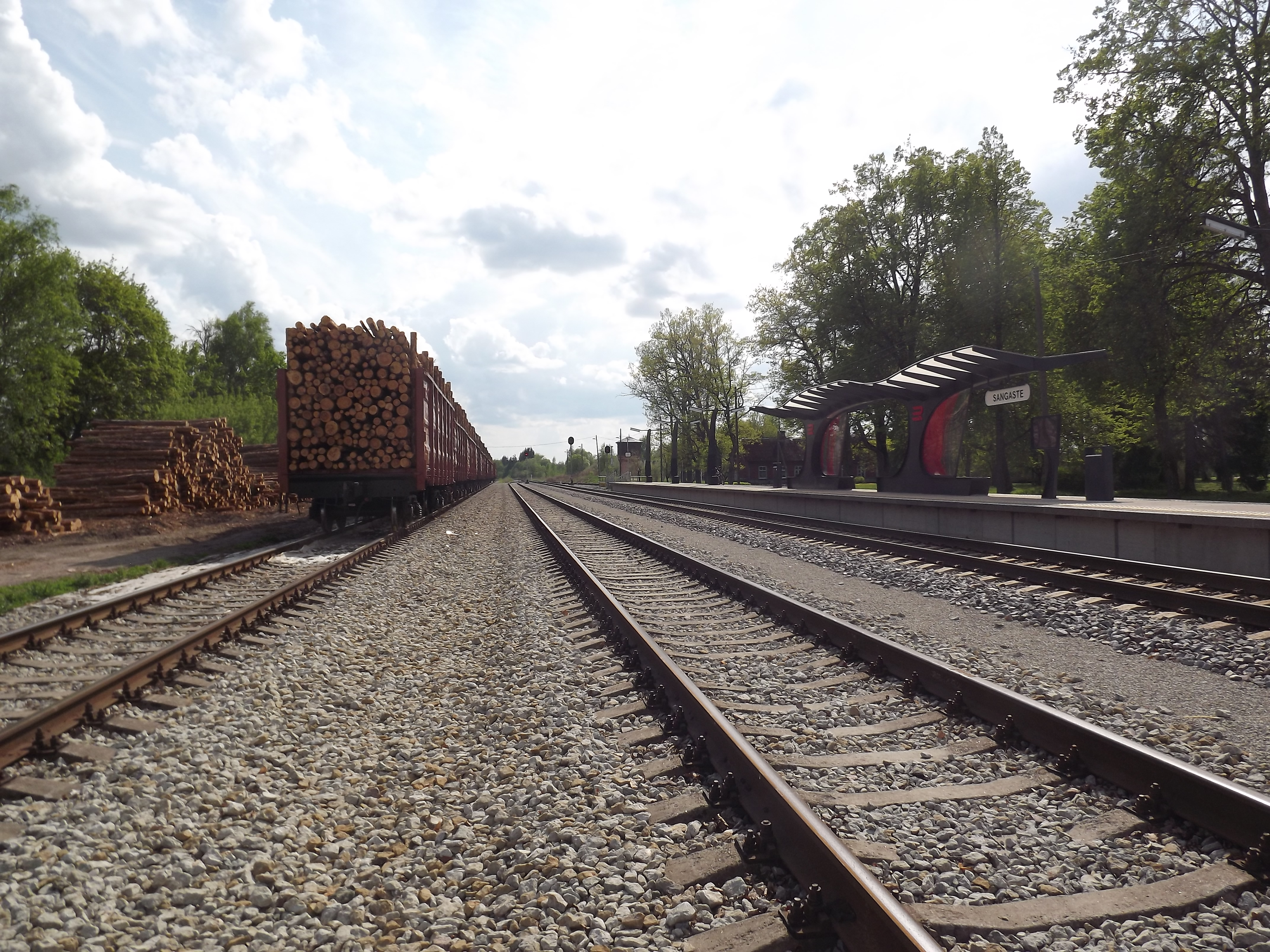
- Sangaste railway station in Tsirguliina

- Location in Estonia
- Coordinates: 57°51′36″N 26°11′49″E
- Country: Estonia
- County: Valga County
- Municipality: Valga Parish
- Established: End of 19th century

Area
  - Total: 2.57 km^{2} (0.99 sq mi)

Population (01.01.2011)
  - Total: 499
  - Density: 194/km^{2} (503/sq mi)
- Website: www.hot.ee/tsirguliina

Tsirguliina is a small borough (alevik) in Valga Parish, Valga County in southern Estonia, located about 13 km northeast of the town of Valga. With the most important institutions and facilities like high school, kindergarten, civic centre, library, post office and medical office, it is one of the more populous boroughs in the parish. The local government is located 3 km east in Laatre.

Tsirguliina was established around the Sangaste station on Tartu–Valga railway shortly after its opening in 1887. Nowadays the train station is still used by passenger traffic.

Tsirguliina borders the Väike Emajõgi River on its southern side. The name means "bird's town" in South Estonian.

Historian Tiit Rosenberg (born 1946) was born in Tsirguliina.
