= Alexander Friedrich von Hueck =

Baltic German scientist and Estophile

Alexander Friedrich von Hueck (7 December 1802 – 28 July 1842) was a Baltic-German professor of anatomy at the University of Tartu (Dorpat), and a notable Estophile.

== Life and work ==
Von Hueck was born in Reval (Tallinn), present-day capital of Estonia. He studied medicine at the University of Dorpat (Tartu) from 1821 to 1825, receiving the Gold Medallion in 1823; and later also in Berlin and Heidelberg. In 1830, he was made professor of anatomy at the University of Dorpat (now University of Tartu), becoming Dean of Medicine in 1835, renewed in 1840. In 1838, he conducted a scientific travel through Livonia with the aim of studying pre-historical animals. He died in Dorpat Tartu on 28 July in 1842.

Among his contributions to his scientific field, were observational studies within eye movement.

He was a founding member of the student organization 'Estonia', established in Dorpat (Tartu) in 1821.

He was one of the founding members in 1838 and from 1842 its president, of the estophile Learned Estonian Society in Tartu.
