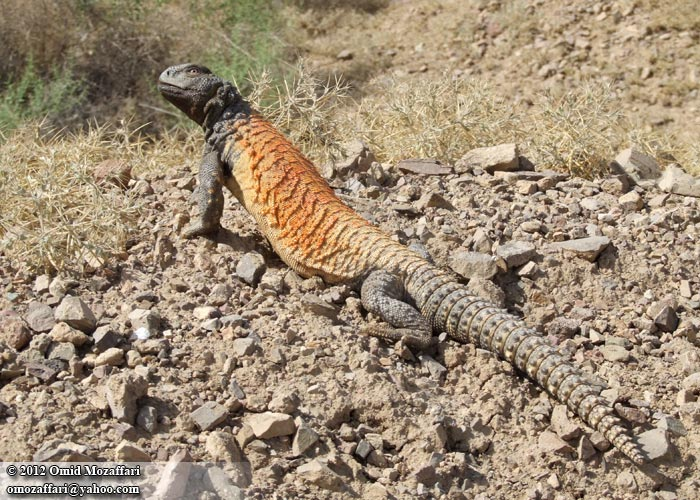

Conservation status
- Least Concern (IUCN 3.1)
- CITES Appendix II

Scientific classification
- Kingdom: Animalia
- Phylum: Chordata
- Class: Reptilia
- Order: Squamata
- Suborder: Iguania
- Family: Agamidae
- Genus: Saara
- Species: S. asmussi

Binomial name
- Saara asmussi (Strauch, 1863)

Synonyms
- Centrotrachelus asmussi Strauch, 1863; Uromastix asmussii — Boulenger, 1885; Uromastyx asmussi — Wermuth, 1967

= Saara asmussi =

Species of lizard

Saara asmussi, also known commonly as the Iranian mastigure and the Persian spiny-tailed lizard, is a species of lizard belonging to the family Agamidae. The species is endemic to Asia.

== Etymology ==
The specific name, asmussi, is in honor of Baltic German paleozoologist Hermann Martin Asmuss.

== Geographic range ==
S. asmussi occurs in Afghanistan, southern Iran, and Pakistan.

== Description ==
S. asmussi may attain a snout-to-vent length (SVL) of 26 cm (10 in), and a tail length of 21 cm (8.3 in).

== Diet ==
S. asmussi eats leaves, stems, and seeds of herbaceous plants.

== Behavior ==
S. asmussi excavates a burrow in which it shelters. If disturbed it lashes its heavy spiky tail in defense.

== Reproduction ==
S. asmussi is oviparous.
