= Tiit Rosenberg =

Estonian historian

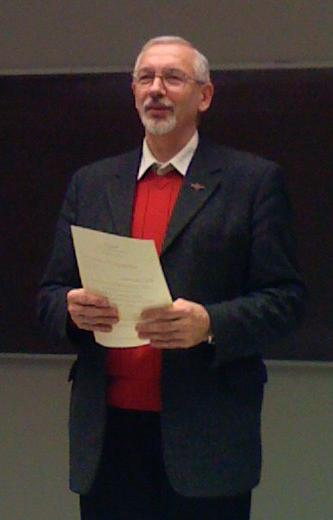
Tiit Rosenberg

Tiit Rosenberg (born 26 December 1946, in Tsirguliina) is an Estonian historian and professor of Estonian History in University of Tartu. In 1996–2008, was he also chairman of Õpetatud Eesti Selts (The Learned Estonian Society).

Rosenberg studies history of agriculture in 19th Century and also Estonian historiography.
