= Tõnu-Andrus Tannberg =

Estonian historian (born 1961)

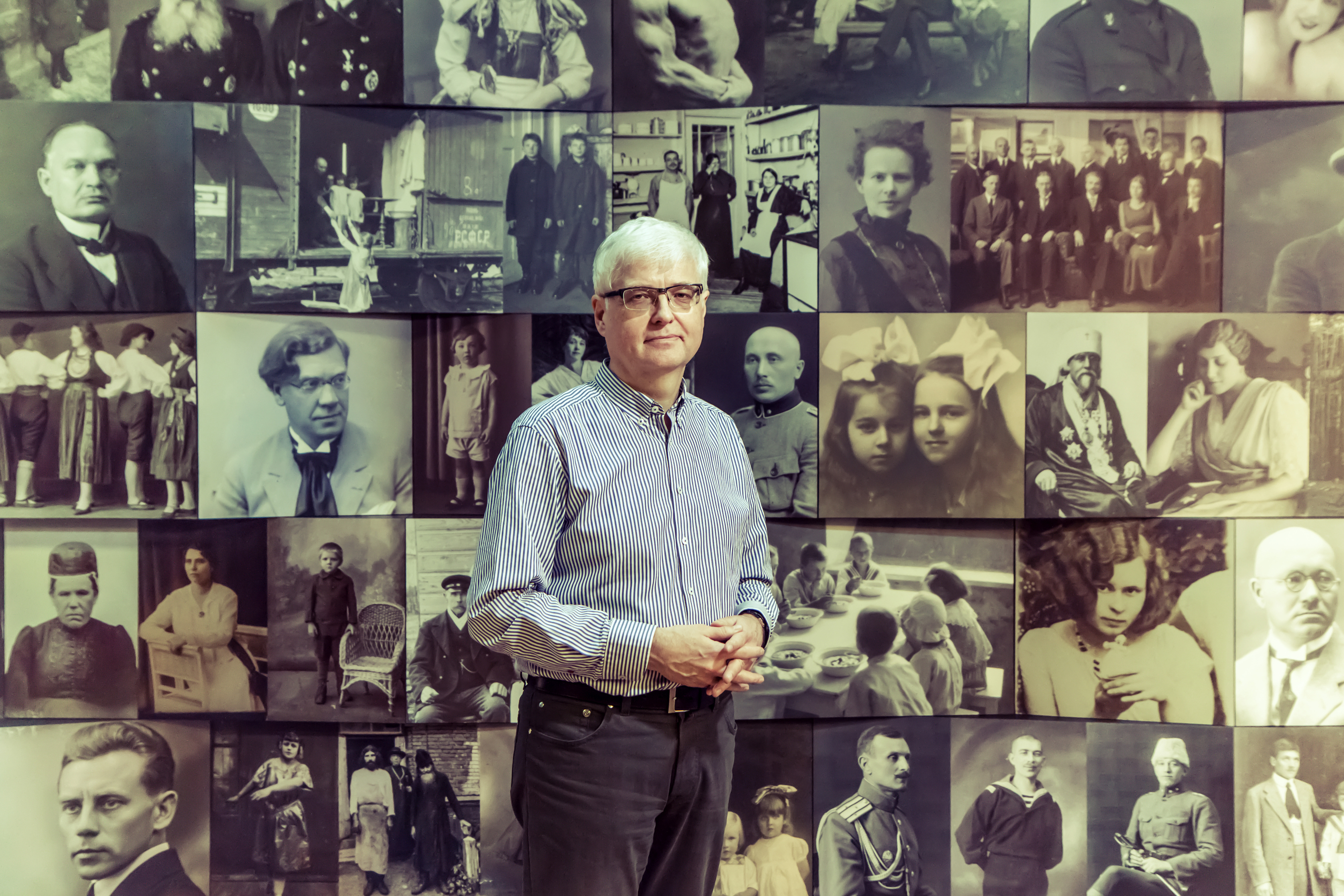
- Tannberg in the lobby of the Noora Building at the National Archives in 2017
- Born: September 22, 1961 (age 64); Rakvere, then part of Estonian SSR, Soviet Union
- Occupation: Historian

Tõnu-Andrus Tannberg (born September 22, 1961) is an Estonian historian and a professor of Estonian history at the University of Tartu. He has been a member of the Estonian Academy of Sciences since 2012.

== Education ==
In 1981, Tannberg started studying at the University of Tartu, where he graduated in 1986. In 1996, he defended his dissertation Maakaitseväekohustus Balti kubermangudes 19. sajandi 1. poolel (1806–1856) (Militia Duty in the Baltic Provinces in the First Half of the Nineteenth Century, 1806–1856), supervised by Helmut Piirimäe, in the History Department of the Faculty of Philosophy at the University of Tartu.

== Career ==
From 1986 to 1994, Tannberg was a history teacher at Puka High School, from 1990 to 2000 a teacher and lecturer at the University of Tartu, from 1995 to 1997 the head of the Estonian Historical Archives, and from 1997 to 1999 its deputy director. From 1999 to 2011, he was an adviser to the state archivist at the National Archives of Estonia, and from 2000 to 2013 he was an associate professor at the University of Tartu's Institute of History and Archeology. Since 2012, he has been the research director of the National Archives, and since 2013 a professor at the Institute of History and Archeology.

Tannberg was elected a member of the Estonian Academy of Sciences in 2012 in the field of history, and he belongs to the Department of Humanities and Social Sciences at the academy.

== Research ==
Tannberg's main areas of research are the political and recent history of the Soviet Union, especially the Estonian SSR. He also studies the history of the Russian Empire and the military history of the Baltic States. He has published several volumes and is a coauthor of textbooks.

== Memberships ==
Tannberg was a member of the research council of the Estonian Literary Museum from 1998 to 2020 and the chairman of the research council of the National Archives between 1999 and 2013. He has also been a member of the editorial board of the historical culture magazine Tuna and a board member of the non-profit organization S-Keskus since 1998, and since 1998 he has also been the editor-in-chief of the serial publication Uurimusi ja allikmaterjale Eesti sõjaajaloost (Research and Source Materials from Estonian Military History). In 1999, he joined the Estonian Academic Historical Society (Estonian: Akadeemiline Ajalooselts), and since 2000 he has been a member of the board of the Learned Estonian Society. Since 2009, Tannberg has been a member of the Association of Estonian Archivists (Estonian: Eesti Arhivaaride Ühing), since 2011 a member of the editorial board of the Yearbook of Estonian Military History (Estonian: Eesti Sõjaajaloo Aastaraamat), and since 2013 a member of the advisory board of the Estonian National Museum and the research advisory board of the Estonian History Museum. From 2010 to 2014, he was a member of the advisory council of the Minister of Defense. Since 2017, he has been a member of the council of the Estonian Institute of Historical Memory, and since 2020 a member of the research council of the Estonian Maritime Museum and the editorial board of the journal Acta Historica Tallinnensia.

== Bibliography ==
- 1996: Maakaitseväekohustus Balti kubermangudes 19. sajandi I poolel (1806–1856) (Militia Duty in the Baltic Provinces in the First Half of the Nineteenth Century, 1806–1856). Tartu.
- 2003: Eesti ajalugu. IV: Põhjasõjast pärisorjuse kaotamiseni (History of Estonia. Vol. 4: From the Northern War to the Abolition of Serfdom). Coauthored with Mati Laur and Helmut Piirimäe; editor-in-chief Sulev Vahtre. Tartu.
- 2005: Eesti ajalugu. VI: Vabadussõjast taasiseseisvumiseni (History of Estonia. Vol. 6: From the War of Independence to Independence). Coauthored and coedited with Ago Pajur, editor-in-chief Sulev Vahtre. Tartu.
- 2020: Toimik "Priboi". Artikleid ja dokumente 1949. aasta märtsiküüditamisest (The "Priboi" File. Articles and Documents from the March 1949 Deportation). Tartu. Author of articles in the volume.
- 2021: Eesti sõjaajalugu: valitud peatükke Vabadussõjast tänapäevani (Estonian Military History: Selected Topics from the War of Independence to the Present Day). Tartu.
- 2023: Eesti mees vene kroonus: uurimusi Baltikumi ja Venemaa sõjaajaloost impeeriumi perioodil 1721–1917 (An Estonian Man with a Russian Crown: Research on the Military History of the Baltics and Russia during the Imperial Period, 1721–1917). Tartu.

== Awards and recognitions ==
- 1997: Award for The Best Book in Estonian about History
- 1998: Friedrich Puksoo Award
- 1998: Tartu Town Council Award
- 2006: Award for The Best Book in Estonian about History
- 2010: Order of the White Star, Fifth Class
- 2011: University of Tartu Badge of Honor
- 2015: National Research Award
- 2015: Hendrik Sepp Prize for the best Estonian publication in military history in 2014
- 2016: Research Award of the Republic of Estonia
- 2021: University of Tartu Medal
