= Hilda Raudkivi =

Estonian radio journalist

- Born: Hilda Ilmjärv; March 18, 1927
- Died: January 18, 1997 (aged 69)
- Occupation: Radio journalist

Hilda Raudkivi (née Hilda Ilmjärv, March 18, 1927 – January 18, 1997) was an Estonian radio journalist. In 1981, she was named an Honored Journalist of the Estonian SSR.

Raudkivi was the wife of the actor Priit Raudkivi (1920–1970) and the mother of the historian Priit Raudkivi (born 1954).
