= Aufeis =

Sheet-like mass of layered ice

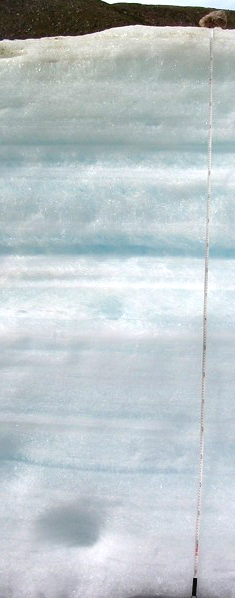
Laminations of ice in a sheet of aufeis

Aufeis (/ˈaʊfaɪs/ OW-fysse) (German for "ice on top") is a sheet-like mass of layered ice that forms from successive flows of ground or river water during freezing temperatures. This form of ice is also called overflow, icings, or the Russian term, naled (Russian: наледь). The term "Aufeis" was first used in 1859 by Alexander von Middendorff after his observations of the phenomenon in northern Siberia.

== Etymology ==
Aufeis literally translates from German to "on-ice". In 1859 the Baltic German scientist and explorer Alexander von Middendorff used the term to describe his observations of the phenomenon in northern Siberia.

== Formation ==
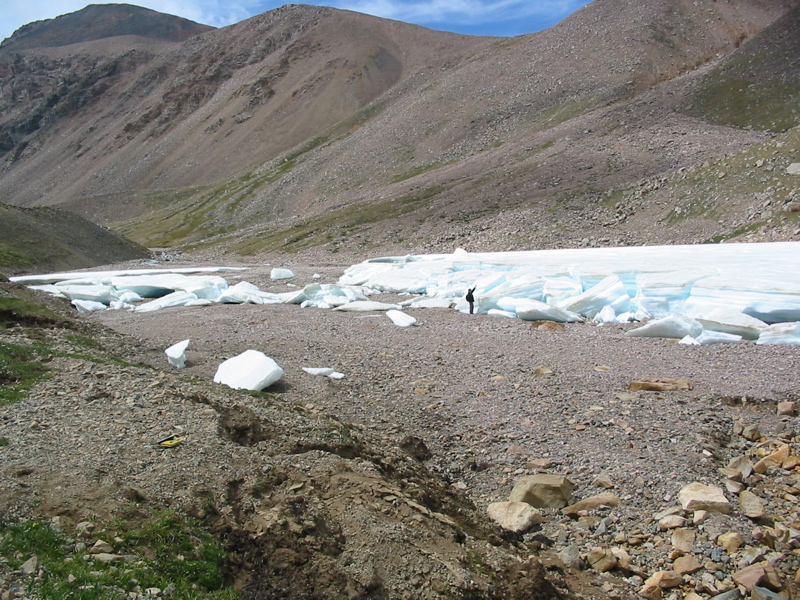
A sheet of aufeis in a glacial valley in Mongolia

Aufeis accumulates during winter along stream and river valleys in arctic and subarctic environments. It forms by upwelling of river water behind ice dams, or by ground-water discharge. The latter mechanism prevails in high gradient alpine streams as they freeze solid. Groundwater discharge is blocked by ice, perturbing the steady state condition and causing a small incremental rise in the local water table until discharge occurs along the bank and over the top of the previously formed ice. Successive ice layers can grow and expand, attaining areas of ~25+ km^{2} and thicknesses of 6+ m. Aufeis typically melt out during summer and will often form in the same place year after year.

River aufeis form when the cross-sectional area of a stream channel becomes locally restricted as ice accumulates during winter. Such restrictions or "choke-points" result in bulk overflow and local increases in hydrostatic pressure, causing water to move upward through fissures onto the original ice layer. The overflowing water subsequently freezes to produce additional ice layers, thus explaining the origin of the term aufeis. This process, repeated through the long arctic winter, can generate large volumes of ice, with some aufeis in arctic Alaska—where they are also known as "icings"—attaining areas of 20+ km^{2} and localized thicknesses of 6+ m. The cumulative area of late-winter aufeis in the Sagavanirktok River drainage alone, for example, ranges from 102 to 103 km^{2}.

== Impact ==
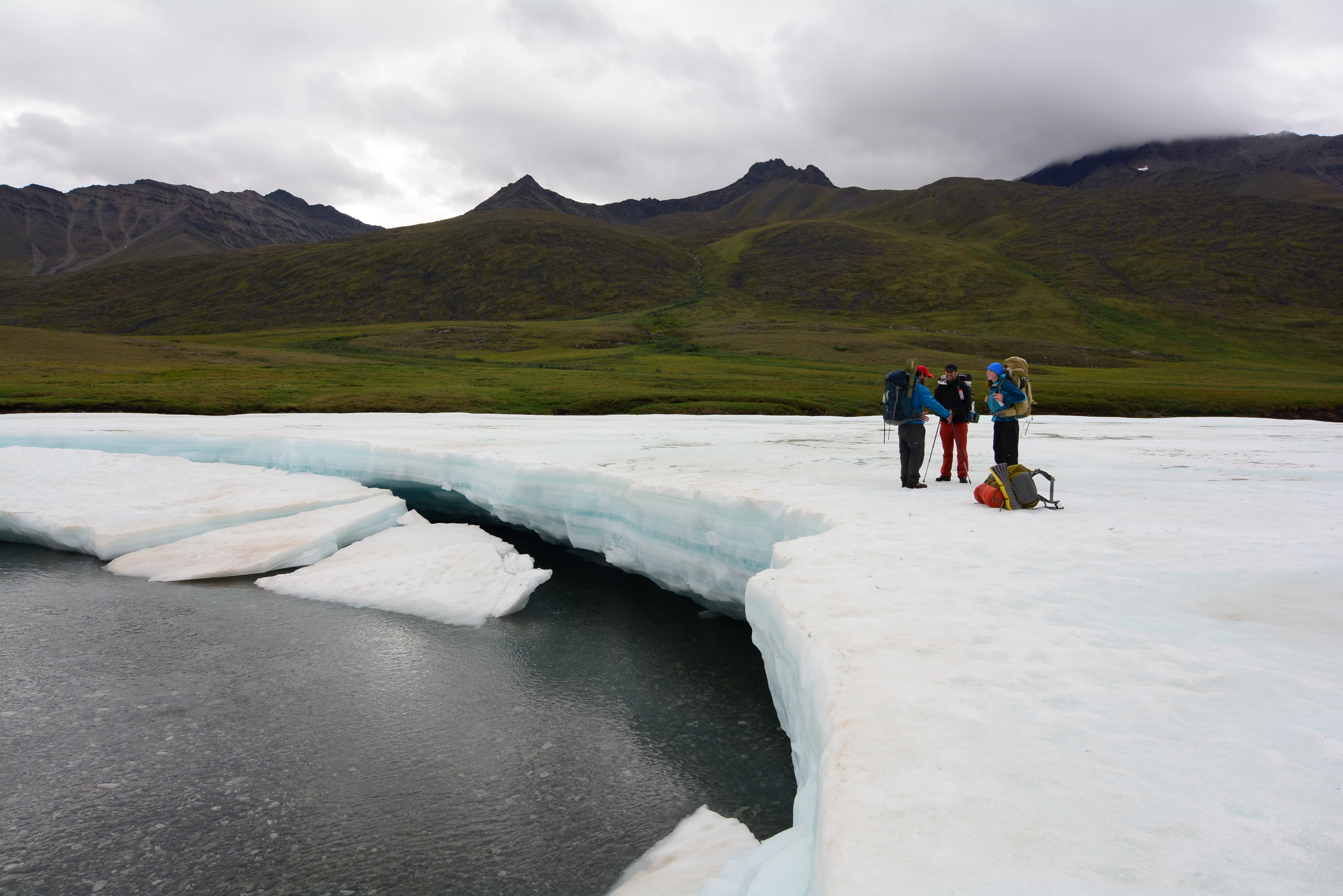
Backpackers cross a sheet of aufeis in the Anaktuvuk River Valley of Alaska

Sheets of aufeis may block stream channels and cause their floodplains to widen as spring floodwaters are forced to flow around the ice. Research on aufeis has to a large extent been motivated by the variety of engineering problems the ice sheets can cause (e.g. blocking drainages and causing flooding of roads).

Aufeis can present an extreme danger to recreational boaters even during summer months, who can find themselves trapped between walls of ice or pulled under aufeis by the current of the river. Breaking dams of aufeis can cause flash floods downriver.

When thawed, aufeis leave footprints in the form of "aufeis glades" or more accurately in tundra habitats, aufeis barrens, because of the near absence of vascular plants due to ice cover during much of the growing season. Aufeis barrens are distinctive landscape features of the arctic tundra and provide reliable indicators of aufeis locations".

=== City cooling ===
In late 2011, Mongolia planned to test the use and storage of artificial naleds as a way of cooling Ulaanbaatar in the hot Mongolian summer, and reducing the use of energy-intensive air conditioning.

== Occurrence ==
River aufeis are common and widespread features of the arctic cryosphere, particularly in northern Alaska and Siberia. In eastern Siberia, where aufeis are known as naleds, 10,000 aufeis with a cumulative area of ~ 50,000 km^{2} containing 30 km^{3} of water have been documented in 2015.

Sheets of aufeis have been observed in Alaska, Arctic Canada, Russia, and Mongolia. Analysis of satellite imagery from 2000 to 2015 has shown that the extent and duration of many Alaskan river icings has decreased due to climate change.
