= Jaan Unt =

Estonian philologist and translator (1947–2021)

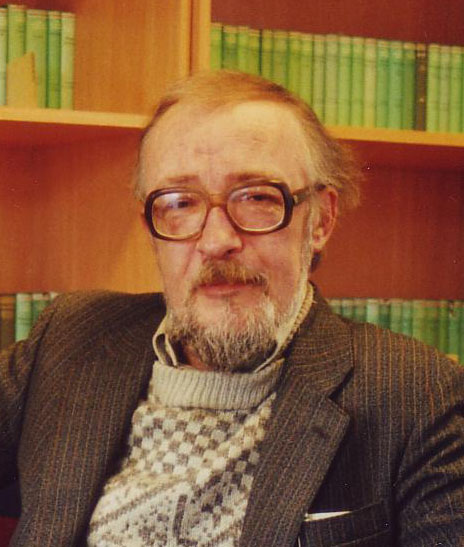
- Born: November 7, 1947; Tartu, Estonia
- Died: January 12, 2012 (aged 64); Tartu, Estonia
- Occupations: Classical philologist, translator, literary scholar

Jaan Unt (November 7, 1947 – January 12, 2012) was an Estonian classical philologist, translator, and literary scholar. He translated from Ancient Greek, Latin, and Russian.

== Early life and education ==
Jaan Unt was born in Tartu, the son of Valter Unt (1908–1964) and Asta Unt (née Haaristo, 1921–?). From 1955 to 1966, he studied Estonian philology at Tartu Secondary School No. 1, and then at Tartu State University from 1966 to 1968. He then served in the Soviet Army. From 1971 to 1976, he studied classical philology at Leningrad State University.

== Career ==
After his military service, Unt taught Estonian at Mustla High School. From 1976 to 1980, he was a senior technical assistant in the History Institute's Feudal History Department at the Academy of Sciences of the Estonian SSR, and from 1980 to 1985 he worked as a freelancer in Tartu. In 1985, he started working as a lecturer at Tartu State University, where he taught until 2008, ending his career as a lecturer in the chair of world literature.

== Family ==
Jaan Unt was the husband of the literary scholar and translator Kersti Unt and the father of the literary scholar and translator Marja Unt and Jaan-Kristjan Unt.

== Bibliography ==
=== Translations ===
- 1982: Bronislawa Witz, Demokritos (Democritus). Tallinn: Eesti Raamat (translation from Russian, translation of fragments of Democritus added from Ancient Greek)
- 1983: Marcus Aurelius, Iseendale (Meditations). Tallinn: Eesti Raamat, 1983 (translation from Ancient Greek)
- 1987: Theocharis Kessidis, Sokrates (Socrates). Tallinn: Eesti Raamat, 1987 (translation from Russian, added translation of Plato's dialogue Charmides from Ancient Greek)
- 1996: Epictetus, Käsiraamat (Handbook, excerpts), Vikerkaar 8–9: 184–191
- 2001: Kenneth McLeish, Aristoteles: Aristotelese poeetika (Aristotle: Aristotle's Poetics). Tallinn: Varrak (translation from English)
- 2003: Aristotle, Luulekunstist (Poetics). Tallinn: Keel ja Kirjandus (translation from Ancient Greek; first edition published in the journal Keel ja Kirjandus 7–8, 1982, pp. 337–356 and 393–409)
- 2003: Plato, Teosed. I. Sokratese apoloogia. Phaidon. Kriton. Pidusöök. Charmides. Phaidros. Euthyphron (Works. I. Apology of Socrates. Phaedo. Crito. Symposium. Charmides. Phaedrus. Euthyphro). Tartu: Ilmamaa (translations of the dialogues Crito and Charmides from Ancient Greek, reprints; previously published in the journal Akadeemia (1, 1994, pp. 57–71) and in the appendix of Theocharis Kessidis's book Sokrates)
- 2006: Epictetus, "Vestlus 1.3" (Discourse 1.3), in the volume Vanakreeka kirjanduse antoloogia, Tallinn: Varrak, pp. 407–408 (translation from Ancient Greek)
- 2010: Dionysius Fabricius, Dionysius Fabriciuse, Viljandi kiriku praosti Liivimaa ajaloo lühiülevaade neljas osas aastast tuhat ükssada viiskümmend kaheksa kuni aastani 1610 = Dionysii Fabricii, Praepositi pontificii Felinensis, Livonicae historiae compendiosa series in quatuor digesta partes ab anno millesimo centesimo quinquagesimo octavo usque ad annum MDCX (A Brief Overview of the History of Livonia by Dionysius Fabricius, Dean of the Church of Viljandi, in Four Parts from the Year 1158 to the Year 1610). Tartu: Johannes Esto Ühing (translation from Latin)

=== Textbooks ===
- 1997: Muistne kirjandus (Ancient Literature). Tallinn: Koolibri (with Haljand Udam, Märt Läänemets, and Aili Kiin)
- 1998: Uue Testamendi kreeka keel algajaile (Greek New Testament for Beginners). Tallinn: Logos
- 2001: Maailmakirjandus I: antiikajast valgustuseni (World Literature I: From Antiquity to the Enlightenment). Tallinn: Koolibri (with Jüri Talvet and Peeter Torop)

=== Articles, interviews, reviews ===
- 1995: "Mitmest vaatenurgast valgustatud Julianus," Postimees, March 30
- 1995: "Expertus linguae Latinae (Ülo Torpatsi 75. sünniaastapäeva puhul)," Postimees, November 16
- 1996: "Mõttemõlgutused Seneca üle II," Postimees, February 22
- 1996: "Jaan Unt – sünnilt oktoobrilaps, elukutselt filoloog, vaimu poolest skeptik" (interview with Jaan Unt; recorded by Katrin Ärm), Sõnumileht, April 27
- 1996: "Epiktetos – ori, kes jutlustas vabadusest," Vikerkaar 8–9: 184–191
- 1999: "Klassikaline Jaan Unt – tagasihoidlik boheemlane" (interview with Jaan Unt, recorded by Monika Puutsa), Postimees, May 12
- 1999: "Carmen Handoni Runnelio dedicatum finitis duodecim lustris," In: Läbi äreva vere: pühendusteos Hando Runnelile. Tartu, 1999, p. 396
- 2001: "Kiri toimetajale kilpkonna asjus," Looming 7: 1110–1111
- 2003: "Jaan Unt kõnetab Aristotelest eesti keeles" (interview with Jaan Unt by Rein Veidemann), Postimees, August 15
- 2003: "Tõsiselt nalja tehes ehk naerust kreeka kombel: katkendeid kogumikust Philogelos," In: Mille anni sicut dies hesterna...: studia in honorem Kalle Kasemaa. Tartu, 2003, pp. 171–180
- 2003: "Humanistlikust kooliharidusest: Sankt Peterburgi klassikalise gümnaasiumi näide," In: Kakssada aastat klassikalist filoloogiat Eestis = Duo saecula philologiae classicae in Estonia. Tartu: Tartu Ülikooli Kirjastus, pp. 145–151
- 2007: "Ärge kartke tuupimist!" (interview by Peeter Olesk), Postimees Extra, November 10
- 2017: Olev Remsu. "Mõjutaja" (article for Unt's 70th birthday) Postimees.ee November 7, print version November 11
- 2017: Kaarina Rein. "Pythease õpiraha," Õpetajate Leht, November 10, p. 20

== Awards ==
- 2001: Order of the White Star, Fifth Class
- 2001: Pytheas Medal
