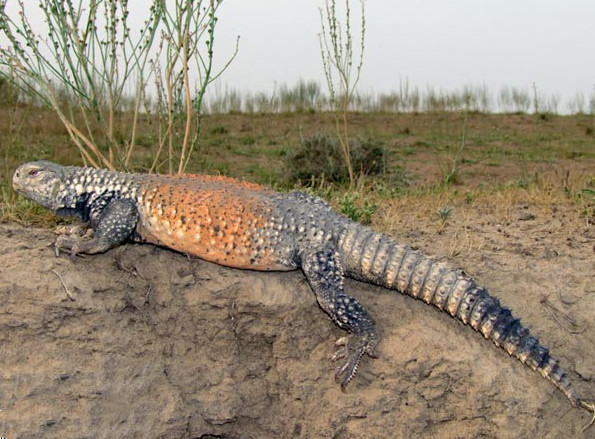

Conservation status
- Least Concern (IUCN 3.1)
- CITES Appendix II (CITES)

Scientific classification
- Kingdom: Animalia
- Phylum: Chordata
- Class: Reptilia
- Order: Squamata
- Suborder: Iguania
- Family: Agamidae
- Genus: Saara
- Species: S. loricata

Binomial name
- Saara loricata (Blanford, 1874)

= Saara loricata =

Species of lizard

Saara loricata, the Iraqi mastigure or Iraqi spiny-tailed lizard, is a species of agamid lizard. It is found in Iraq and Iran.
