= Ivar Leimus =

Estonian historian and numismatist

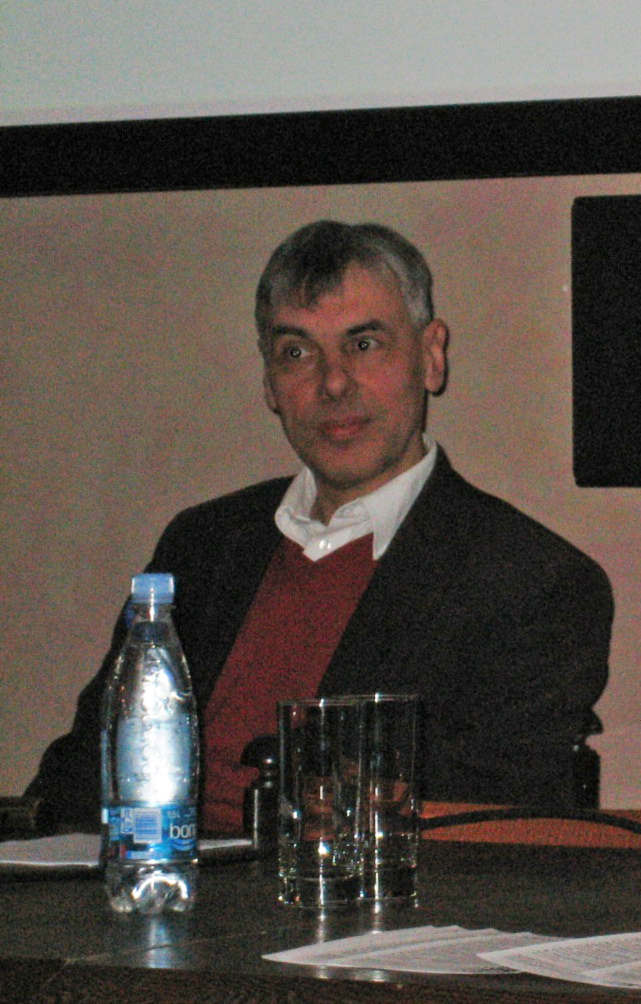
Ivar Leimus

Ivar Leimus (born 3 June 1953) is an Estonian historian and numismatist.

In 1979 he graduated from Tartu University in history. Since 1976 he has worked for Tartu University.

Since 2003 he is the chairperson of the Estonian Academic History Society (Estonian: Eesti Akadeemiline Ajalooselts).

Awards:

- 2007: Order of the White Star, IV class.

== Works ==
- Der Münzfund von Kose aus dem zweiten Viertel des 12. Jahrhunderts. Eesti Raamat, Tallinn 1986
- Das Münzwesen Livlands im 16. Jahrhundert. (1515–1581/94) (= Stockholm Studies in Numismatics. 1). Stockholm Numismatic Institute, Stockholm University 1995, ISBN 91-972706-0-1
- Numismaatika alused. 1996
- Estonian Collections. Anglo-Saxon, Anglo-Norman and later British Coins (= Sylloge of Coins of the British Isles. 51). Oxford University Press u. a., Oxford u. a. 2001, ISBN 0-19-726220-1. [with Arkadi Molvõgin]
- Land Rolle des Herzogthums Ehstland (= Thesaurus historiae. 1). Faksimile-Ausgabe. Eesti Ajaloomuuseum, Tallinn 2007.
- Sylloge of Islamic coins 710/1 – 1013/4 AD. Estonian public collections (= Thesaurus historiae. 2). Estonian History Museum, Tallinn 2007, ISBN 978-9949-15-255-1
