= Dionysius Fabricius =

Chronicler who worked in Livonia

Dionysius Fabricius (1564–1617) was a clergyman and chronicler active in Livonia in the 17th century.

Dionysius Fabricius was the dean of the church in Viljandi. His best-known work is the four-volume Livonicae Historiae compendiosa series, in quatuor digesta partes ab anno 1158 usque ad annum 1610, which deals with the history of Livonia.
