= Priit Raudkivi (actor) =

Estonian actor (1920 – 1970)

- Born: Friedrich Raudkivi; May 29, 1920; Paatsalu, Estonia
- Died: May 3, 1970 (aged 49); Tallinn, then part of Estonian SSR, Soviet Union
- Occupation: Actor

Priit Raudkivi (né Friedrich Raudkivi; May 29, 1920 – May 3, 1970) was an Estonian actor.

== Early life and education ==
Raudkivi was born in Paatsalu, Estonia, to Villem Raudkivi (1872–1960) and Miina Raudkivi (née Pajuwidik, 1885–1956). Both of his parents were postal clerks. He studied at the commercial school in Tallinn and graduated from the State Theater Institute of the Estonian SSR in 1950. He participated in the Second World War as part of the Estonian Rifle Corps.

== Career ==
Raudkivi was a journalist for Rahva Hääl in 1946. From 1946 to 1949, he worked as an actor at the Estonia Theater, and from 1949 to 1959 at the Drama Theater (as the head of the teaching studio there). From 1959 to 1963, he was a director's assistant at Tallinnfilm, and from 1963 he led amateur acting circles.

Raudkivi wrote dramatizations (including Eduard Vilde's Kippari unerohi).

== Filmography ==
- 1959: Vallatud kurvid, first assistant director
- 1960: Perekond Männard, assistant director
- 1962: Ühe küla mehed, assistant director

== Family ==
Raudkivi was married to the radio journalist Hilda Raudkivi (1927–1997). His son is the historian Priit Raudkivi (born 1954).
