= Learned Estonian Society =

Organization based in Estonia

The Learned Estonian Society (Estonian: Õpetatud Eesti Selts, shortened ÕES; German: Gelehrte Estnische Gesellschaft, shortened GEG) is Estonia's oldest scholarly organisation, and was formed at the University of Tartu in 1838. Its charter was to study Estonia's history and pre-history, its language, literature and folklore.

Friedrich Robert Faehlmann, Alexander Friedrich von Hueck and Dietrich Heinrich Jürgenson led the society that consisted of Estonian and Estophile Baltic German intellectuals. The society provides language analysis services in addition to assistance in the development of the scientific study of history, archeology, ethnography, numismatics and art history. The society published yearbooks, bibliographies and Proceedings. The initial version of Friedrich Reinhold Kreutzwald's Kalevipoeg was published in its Proceedings between 1857 and 1861.

In 1950, the Soviet occupation authorities shut down the society and split its collection of 25,000 books, 160,000 pages of manuscripts and 60,000 ethnographical items between several other institutes. The society was restored in 1988 on the initiative of Professor Herbert Ligi of Tartu University.

As of 2015, the society's board of directors was: Mart Kuldkepp, Taavi Pae, Marju Luts-Sootak, Tiit Rosenberg, Kersti Taal, Tõnu-Andrus Tannberg, Heiki Valk, and Piret Õunapuu.

== See also ==
- Society of Estonian Literati
- Finnish Literary Society
- Latvian Literary Society
- Lithuanian Literary Society
