= Priit Raudkivi (historian) =

Estonian historian

- Born: November 4, 1954 (age 71)
- Occupation: Historian

Priit Raudkivi (born November 4, 1954) is an Estonian historian.

== Education ==
Raudkivi graduated from Tartu State University as a historian in 1980. He received his doctorate in 1987.

== Career ==
From 1980 to 1981, he worked in the Central Archive of the National History of the Estonian SSR. He started working at the Estonian History Institute in 1981. He has lectured at the University of Tartu, the Estonian Institute of Humanities, and Tallinn University on Estonia and the European Middle Ages, as well as the early history of the Baltic countries. Raudkivi is mainly engaged in studying the history of Estonia, Latvia, and Britain. He has written several works about the kings of England, as well as a lengthy study of the early Livonian Diet. He is also the author of several school textbooks.

== Bibliography ==
- 1991: Maapäeva kujunemine: peatükk Liivimaa 14.–15. sajandi ajaloost (The Formation of the Diet: A Chapter from the 14th–15th-Century History of Livonia). Tallinn
- 2001: Caesarist Tudoriteni: 1500 aastat Britannia ajalugu (From Caesar to the Tudors: 1,500 Years of British History). Tallinn: Argo
- 2002: Tudorid Inglismaa troonil: ühe suguvõsa lugu 1485–1603 (The Tudors on the Throne of England: The Story of One Family, 1485–1603). Tallinn: Argo
- 2004: Suurbritannia sünd (The Birth of Great Britain). Tallinn: Argo
- 2007: Vana-Liivimaa maapäev: ühe keskaegse struktuuri kujunemislugu (The Old Livonian Diet: The Story of the Formation of a Medieval Structure). Tallinn: Argo

== Awards ==
- 2011: Order of Merit of Tallinn University

== Family ==
Raudkivi is the son of the actor Priit Raudkivi (1920–1970) and the radio journalist Hilda Raudkivi (1927–1996).
