= Tõlliste Parish =

Former municipality of Estonia

Coordinates: 57°51′30″N 26°10′42″E

Tõlliste Parish Tõlliste vald
- Former municipality of Estonia
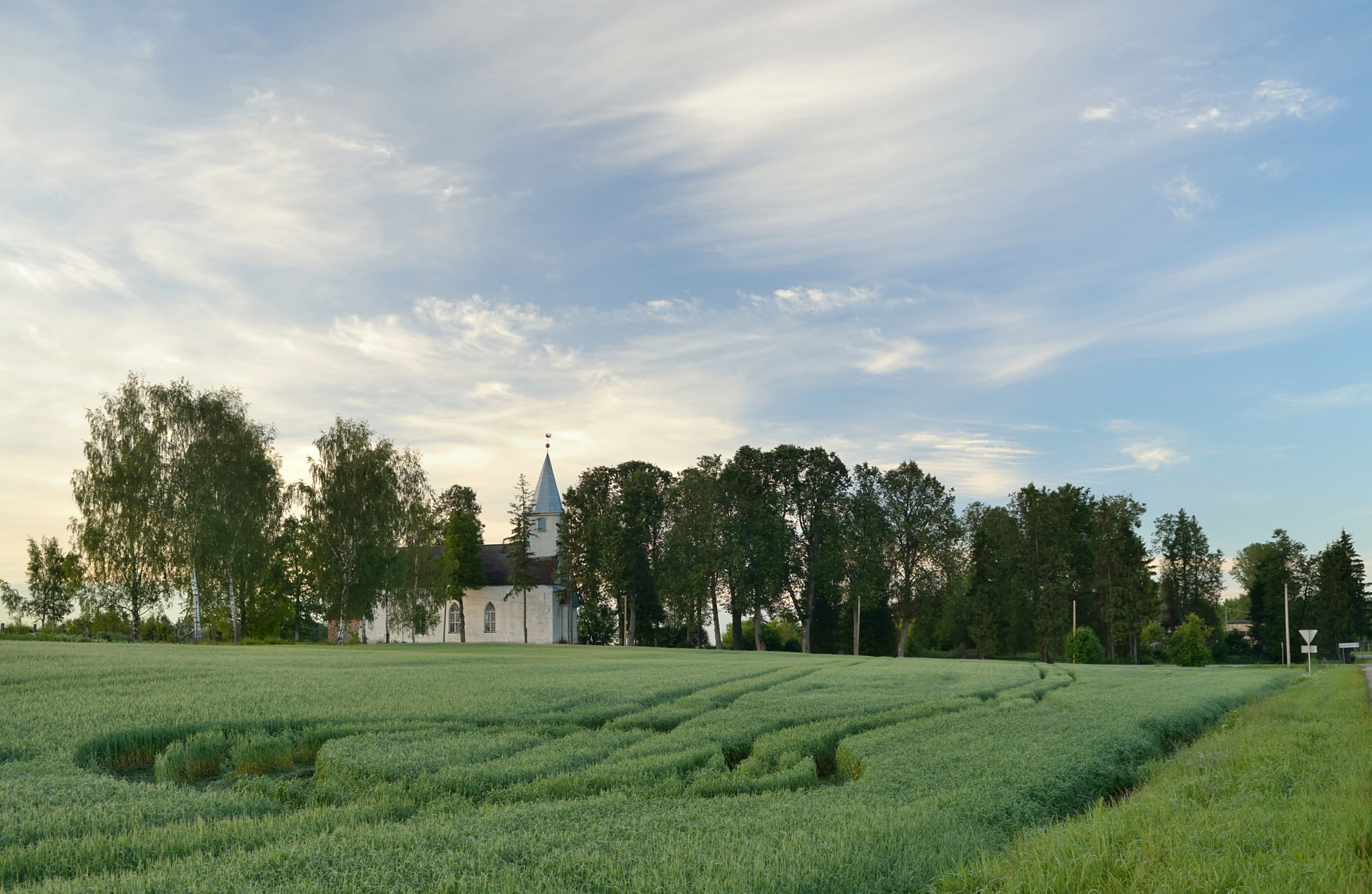
- Laatre church

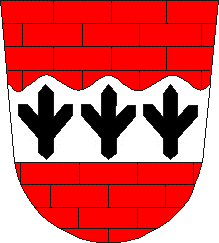
- Flag Coat of arms

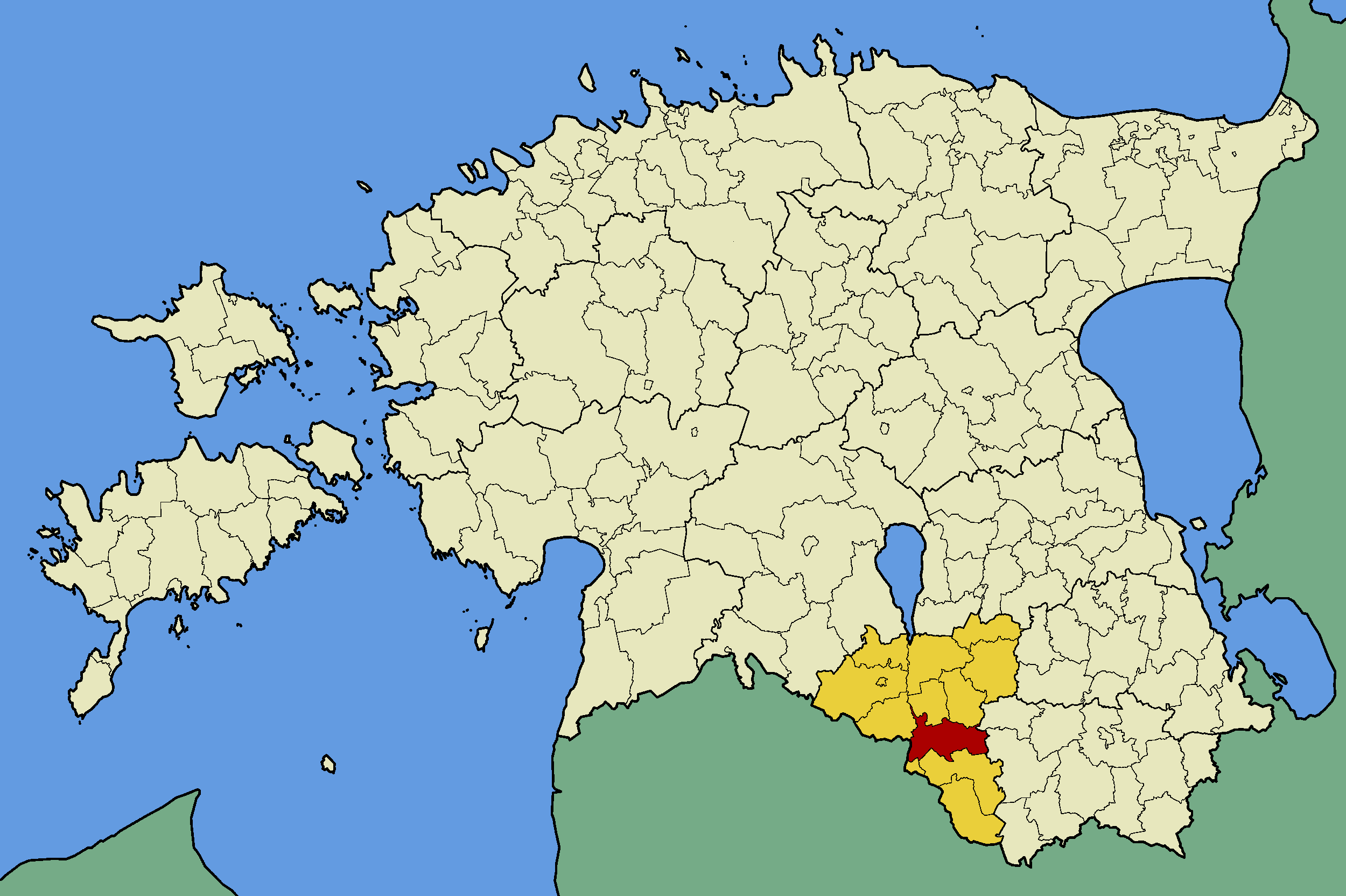
- Tõlliste Parish within Valga County.
- Country: Estonia
- County: Valga County
- Administrative centre: Laatre
  - Mayor: (Social Democrates)

Area
  - Total: 193.78 km^{2} (74.82 sq mi)

Population (01.01.2010)
  - Total: 1,785
  - Density: 9.211/km^{2} (23.86/sq mi)
- Website: www.tolliste.ee

Tõlliste Parish (Estonian: Tõlliste vald) was a rural municipality of Estonia, in Valga County. It occupied an area of 193.78 km^{2} (74.82 sq mi) with a population of 1,785 (as of 1 January 2010).

== Settlements ==
Small boroughs

Laatre – Tsirguliina

Villages

Iigaste – Jaanikese – Korijärve – Muhkva – Paju – Rampe – Sooru – Supa – Tagula – Tinu – Tõlliste – Väljaküla – Vilaski
