= Taheva Parish =

Former municipality of Estonia

Coordinates: 57°37′47″N 26°20′15″E

Taheva Parish Taheva vald
- Former municipality of Estonia
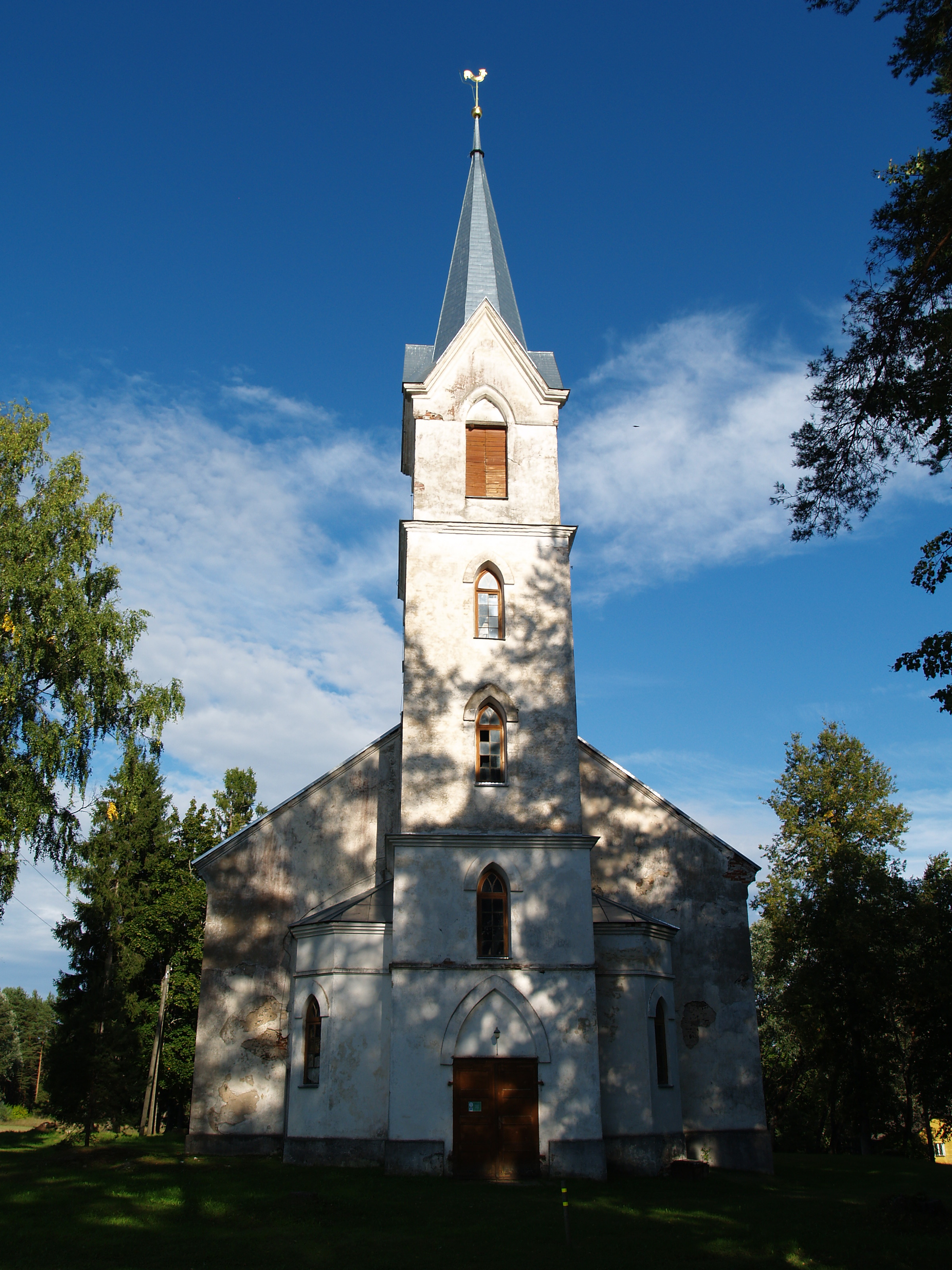
- Hargla church

- Flag Coat of arms

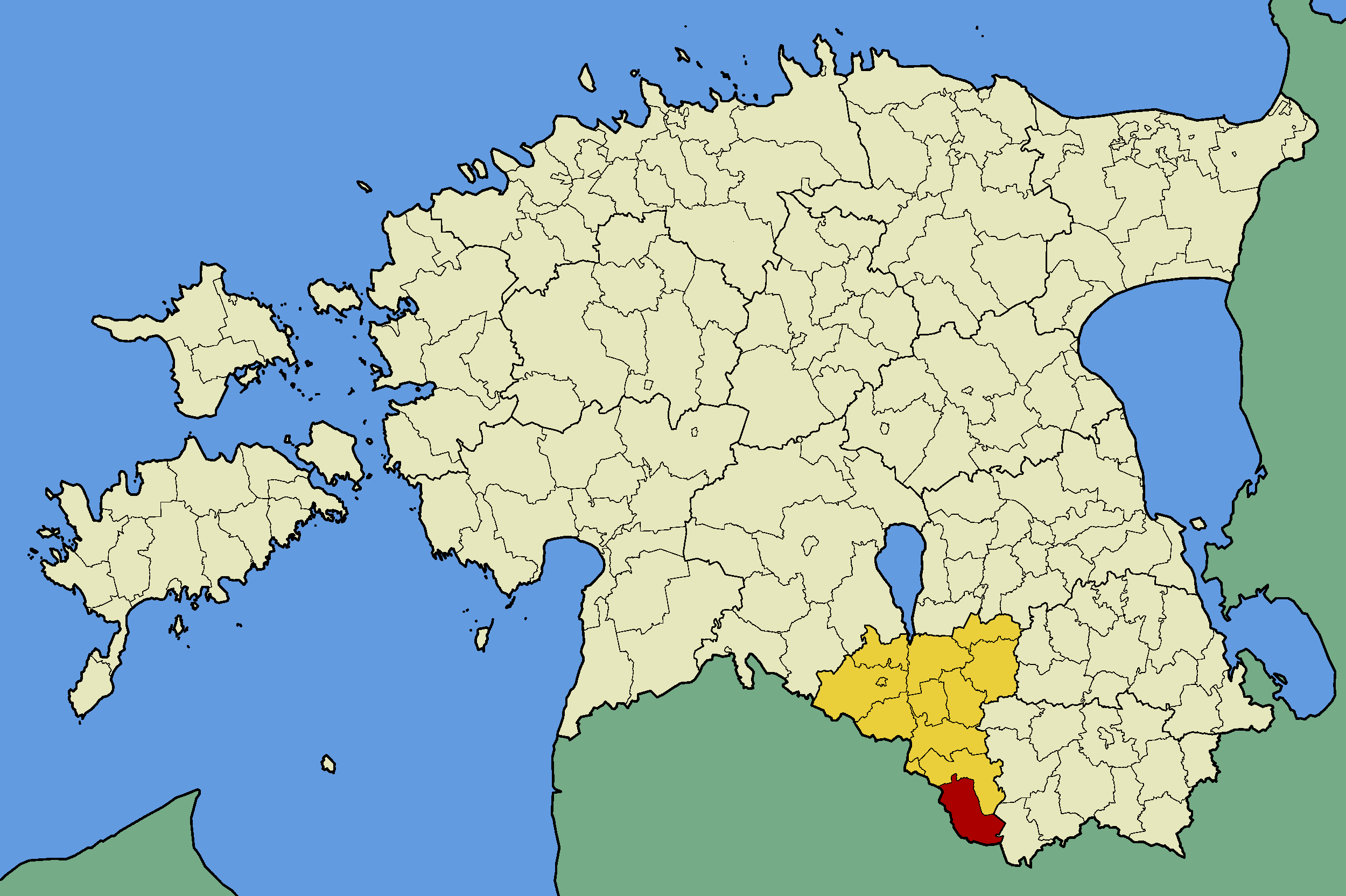
- Taheva Parish within Valga County.
- Country: Estonia
- County: Valga County
- Administrative centre: Laanemetsa
  - Mayor: (IRL)

Area
  - Total: 204.70 km^{2} (79.04 sq mi)

Population (01.01.2010)
  - Total: 925
  - Density: 4.52/km^{2} (11.7/sq mi)
- Website: www.taheva.ee

Taheva Parish (Estonian: Taheva vald) was a rural municipality of Estonia, in Valga County. It occupied an area of 204.70 km^{2} (79.04 sq mi) with a population of 925.

Politician and former member of the European Parliament Tunne Kelam (born 1936) was born in Taheva municipality.

== Settlements ==
Villages

Hargla - Kalliküla - Koikküla - Koiva - Korkuna - Laanemetsa - Lepa - Lutsu - Nakatu - Ringiste - Sooblase - Taheva - Tõrvase - Tsirgumäe

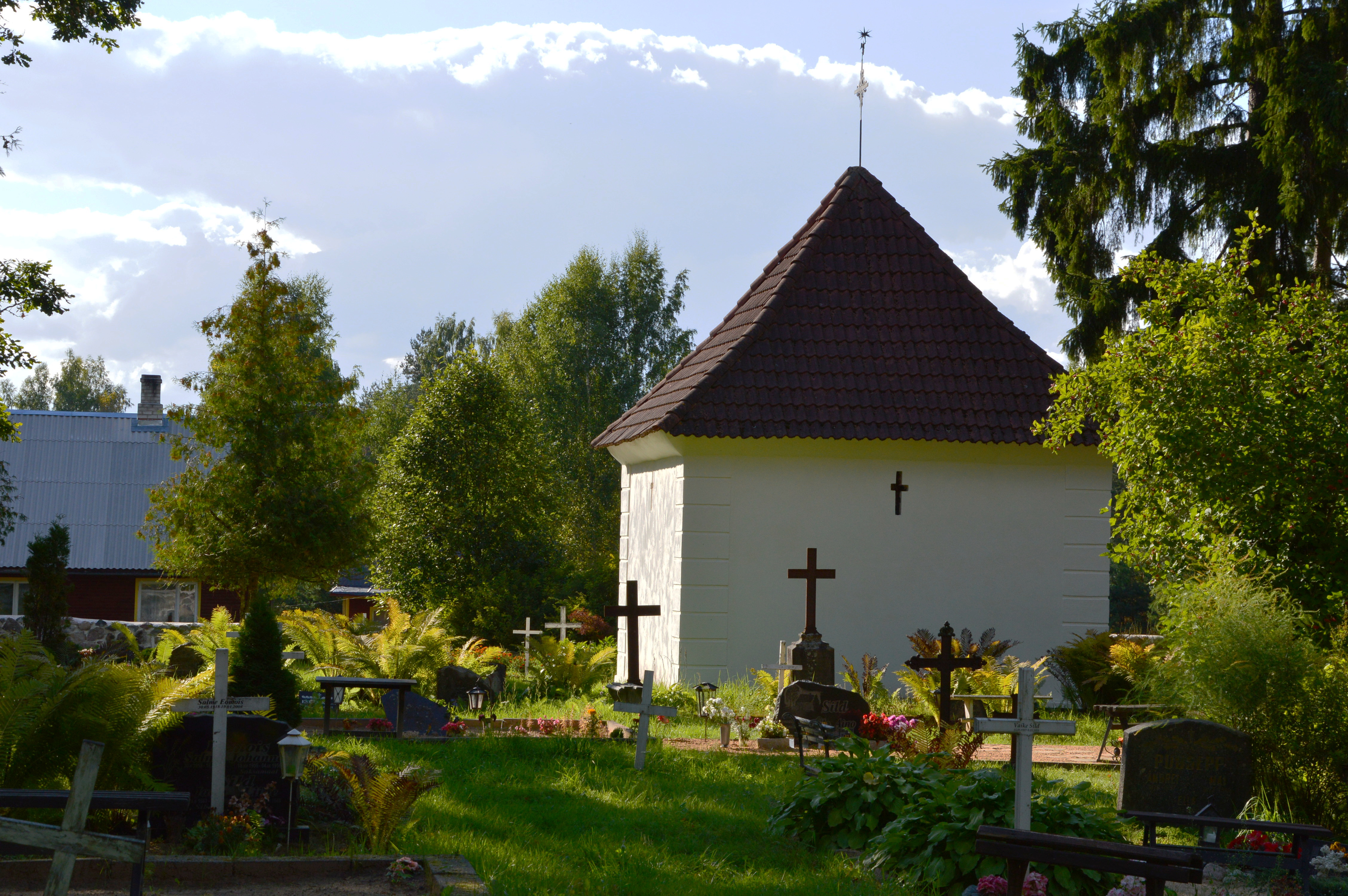
Hargla cemetery

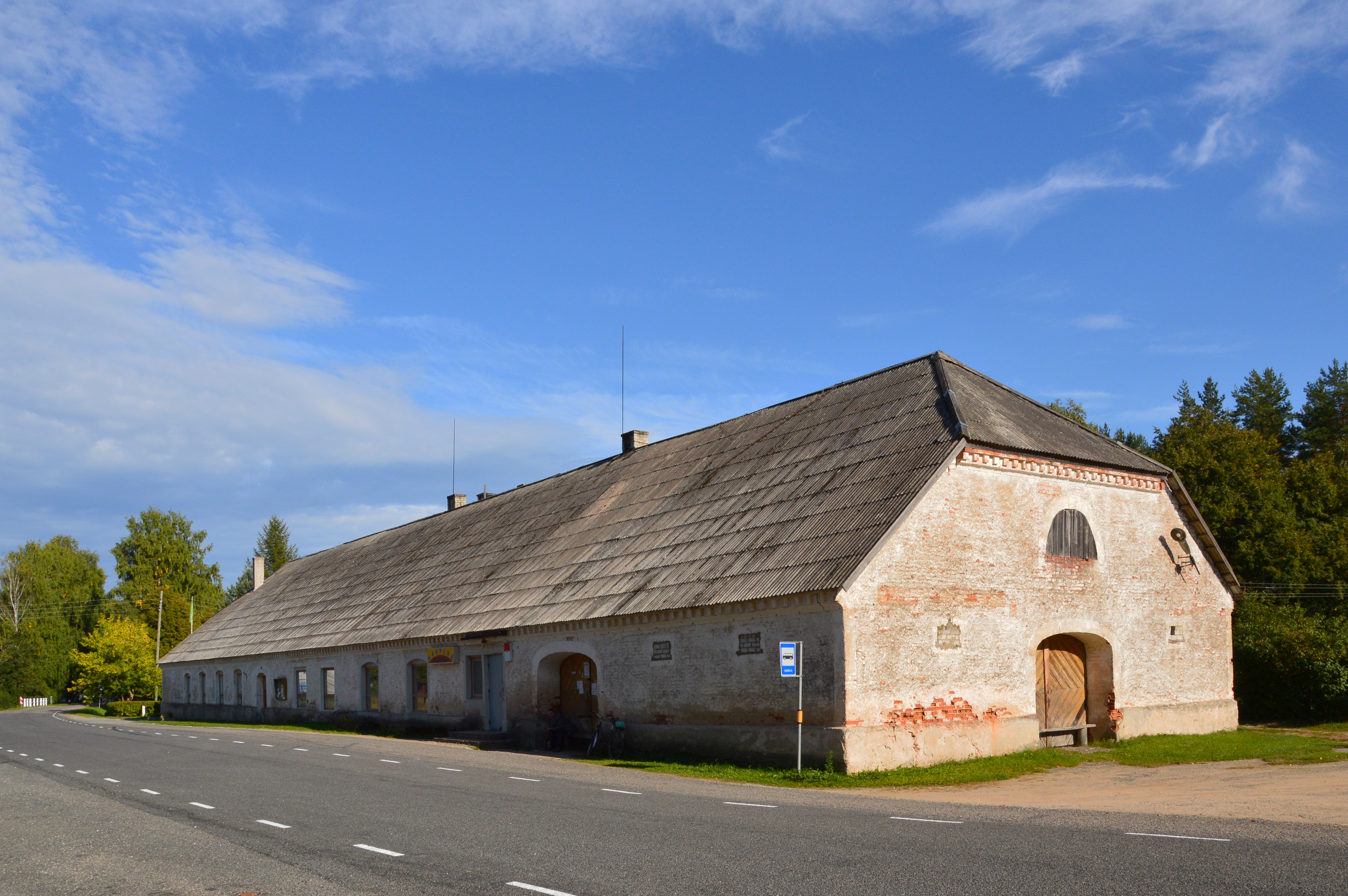
Hargla inn

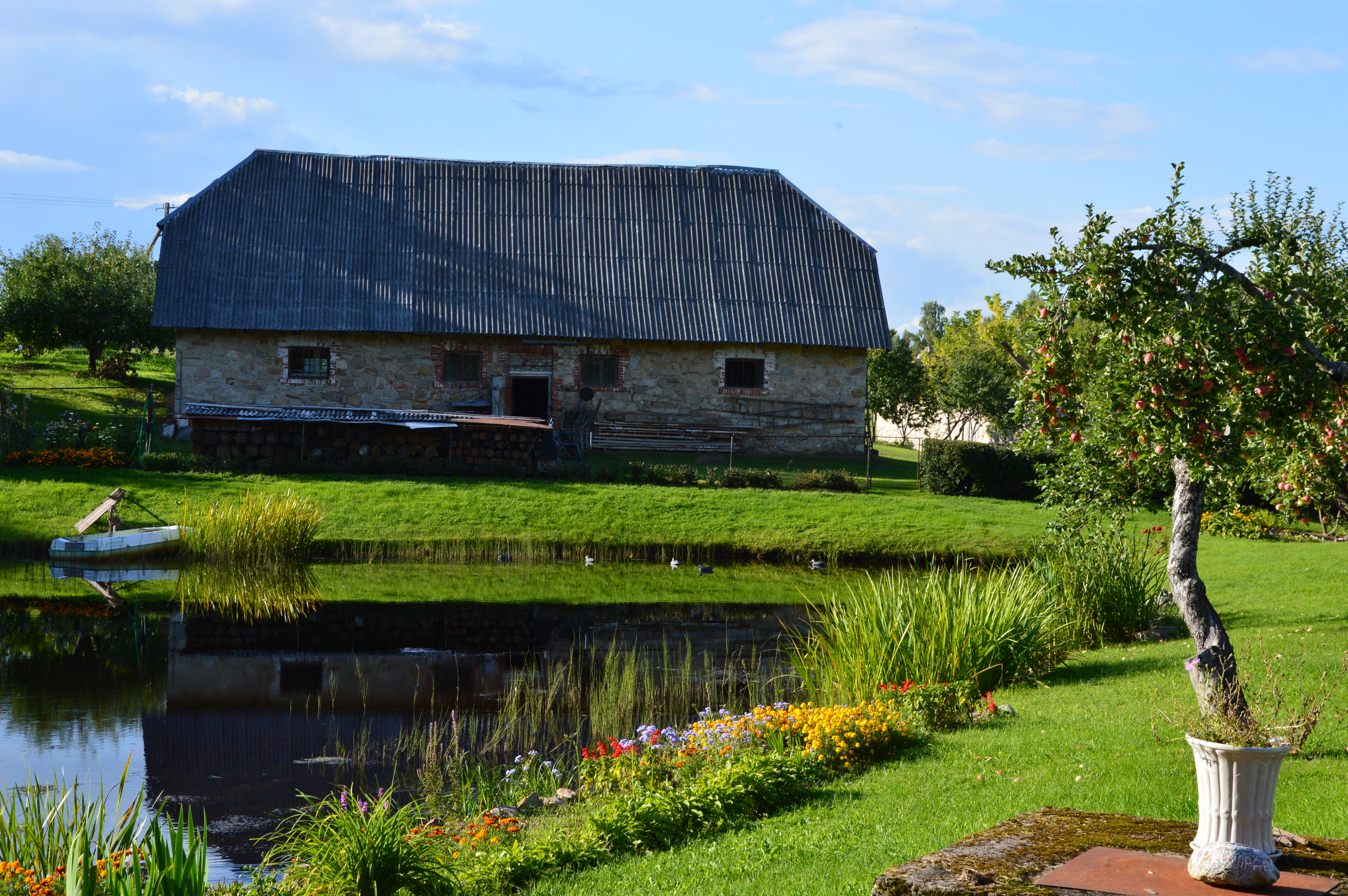
Taheva manor spirits cellar

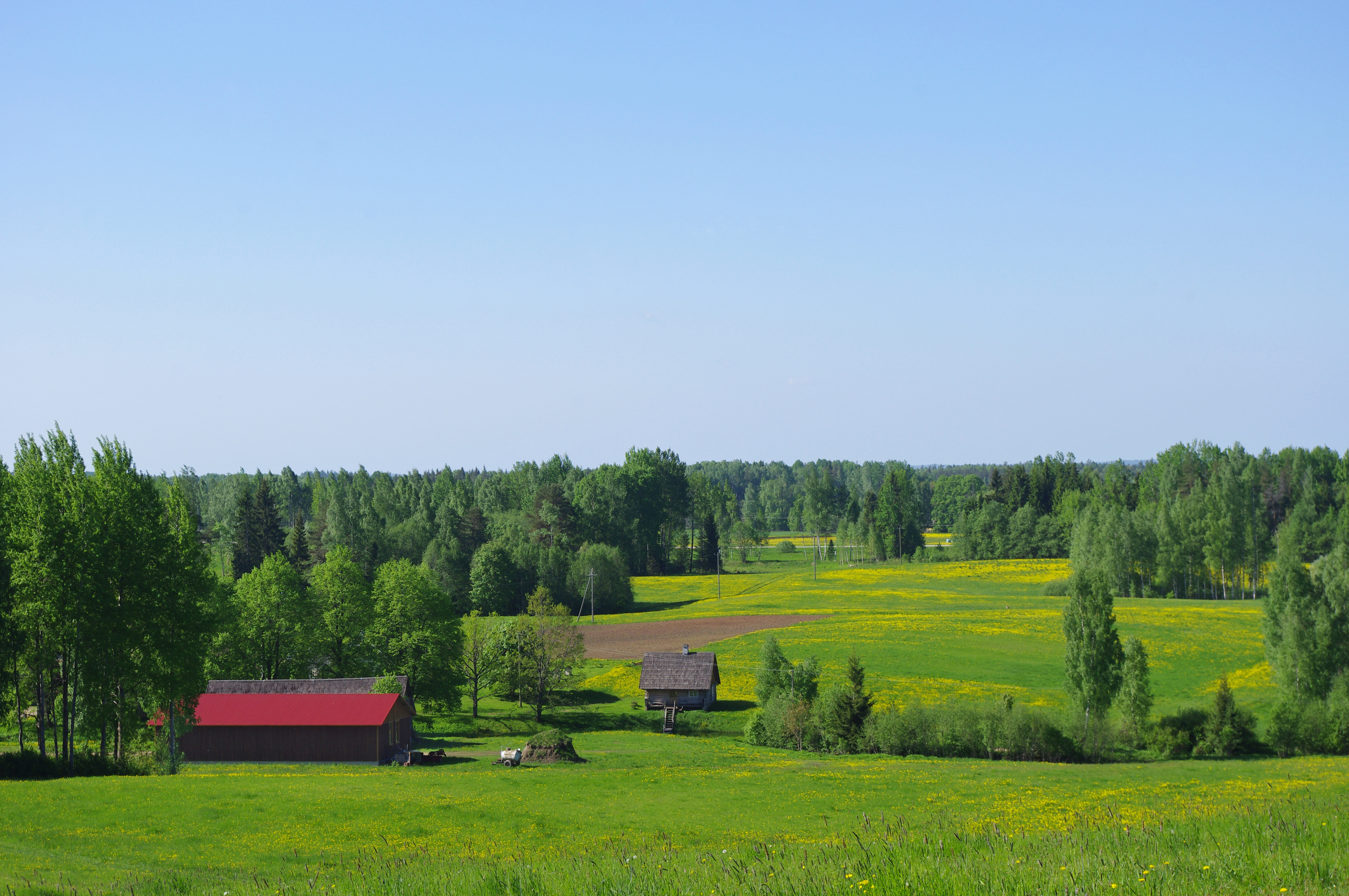
Laanemetsa village
