= Õru Parish =

Former municipality of Estonia

Coordinates: 57°55′33″N 26°10′44″E

Õru Parish Õru vald
- Municipality of Estonia
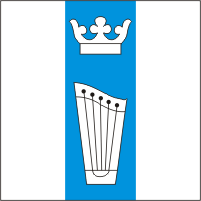
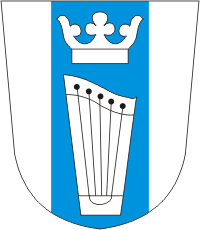
- Flag Coat of arms

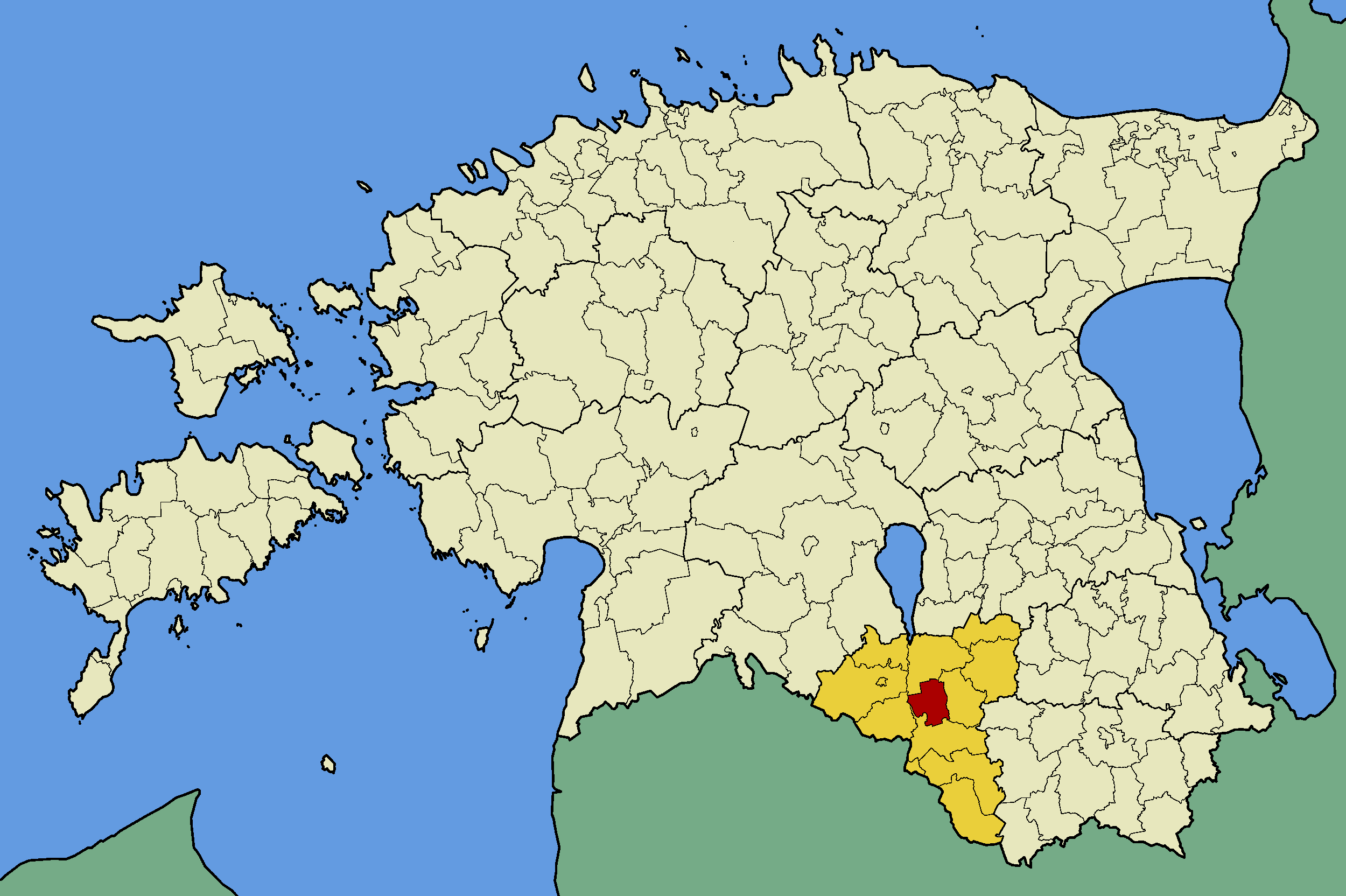
- Õru Parish within Valga County.
- Country: Estonia
- County: Valga County
- Administrative centre: Õru

Government
  - Municipality Elder: Agu Kabrits (Estonian Center Party)

Area
  - Total: 104.6 km^{2} (40.4 sq mi)

Population (01.01.2010)
  - Total: 556
  - Density: 5.32/km^{2} (13.8/sq mi)
- Website: www.oeruvv.ee

Õru Parish was a rural municipality in Valga County, Estonia.

== Settlements ==
Small borough

Õru

Villages

Killinge - Kiviküla - Lota - Mustumetsa - Õlatu - Õruste - Priipalu - Uniküla
