= Pikkjärv =

Pikkjärv ('long lake' as noun) or Pikkjärve ('long lake' as genitive) are Estonian-language toponyms:

- Pikkjärv (Ongassaare), a lake in Ida-Viru County
- Pikkjärv (Pikkjärve), a lake in Valga County
- Pikkjärv (Viitna), a lake in Lääne-Viru County
- Pikkjärve, Jõgeva County, a village in Jõgeva Parish, Jõgeva County
- Pikkjärve, Valga County, a village in Valga Parish, Valga County
