= Pikkjärv (Pikkjärve) =

Lake in Estonia

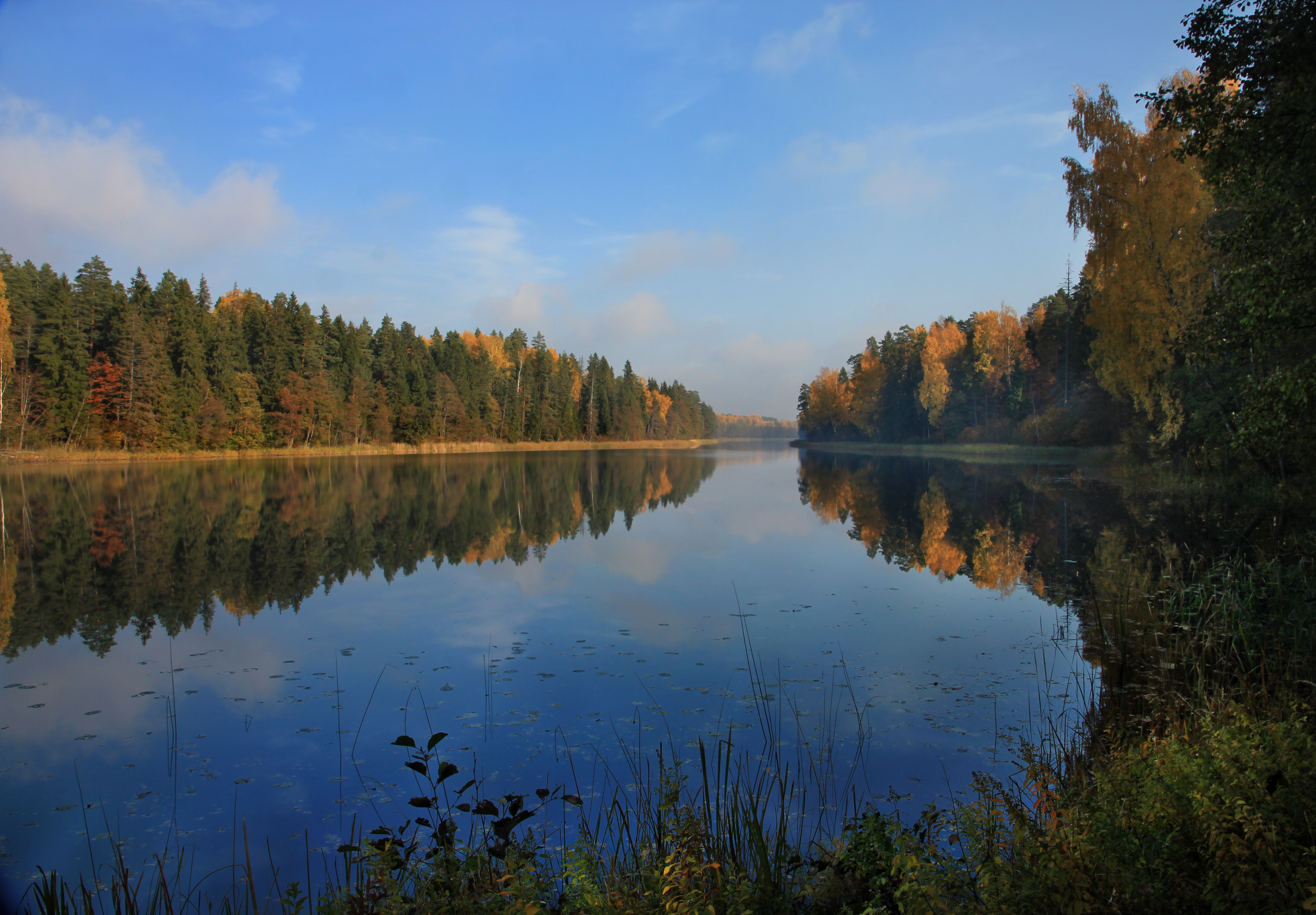

- Location within Estonia
- Location: Valga Parish, Valga County, Estonia
- Coordinates: 57.770802°N 26.3134°E
- Basin countries: Estonia
- Max. length: 2,990 meters (9,810 ft)
- Surface area: 36.9 hectares (91 acres)
- Average depth: 4.9 meters (16 ft)
- Max. depth: 12.6 meters (41 ft)
- Shore length^{1}: 6,960 meters (22,830 ft)
- Surface elevation: 51.8 meters (170 ft)
- ^{1} Shore length is not a well-defined measure.

Pikkjärv (also Karula Pikkjärv or Pikkeri järv) is a lake in Estonia. It is located in the villages of Pikkjärve and Kirbu in Valga Parish, Valga County.

== Physical description ==
The lake has an area of 36.9 hectares (91 acres). The lake has an average depth of 4.9 meters (16 ft) and a maximum depth of 12.6 meters (41 ft). It is 2,990 meters (9,810 ft) long, and its shoreline measures 6,960 meters (22,830 ft).

== See also ==
- List of lakes of Estonia
