= Karl Luik =

Estonian politician

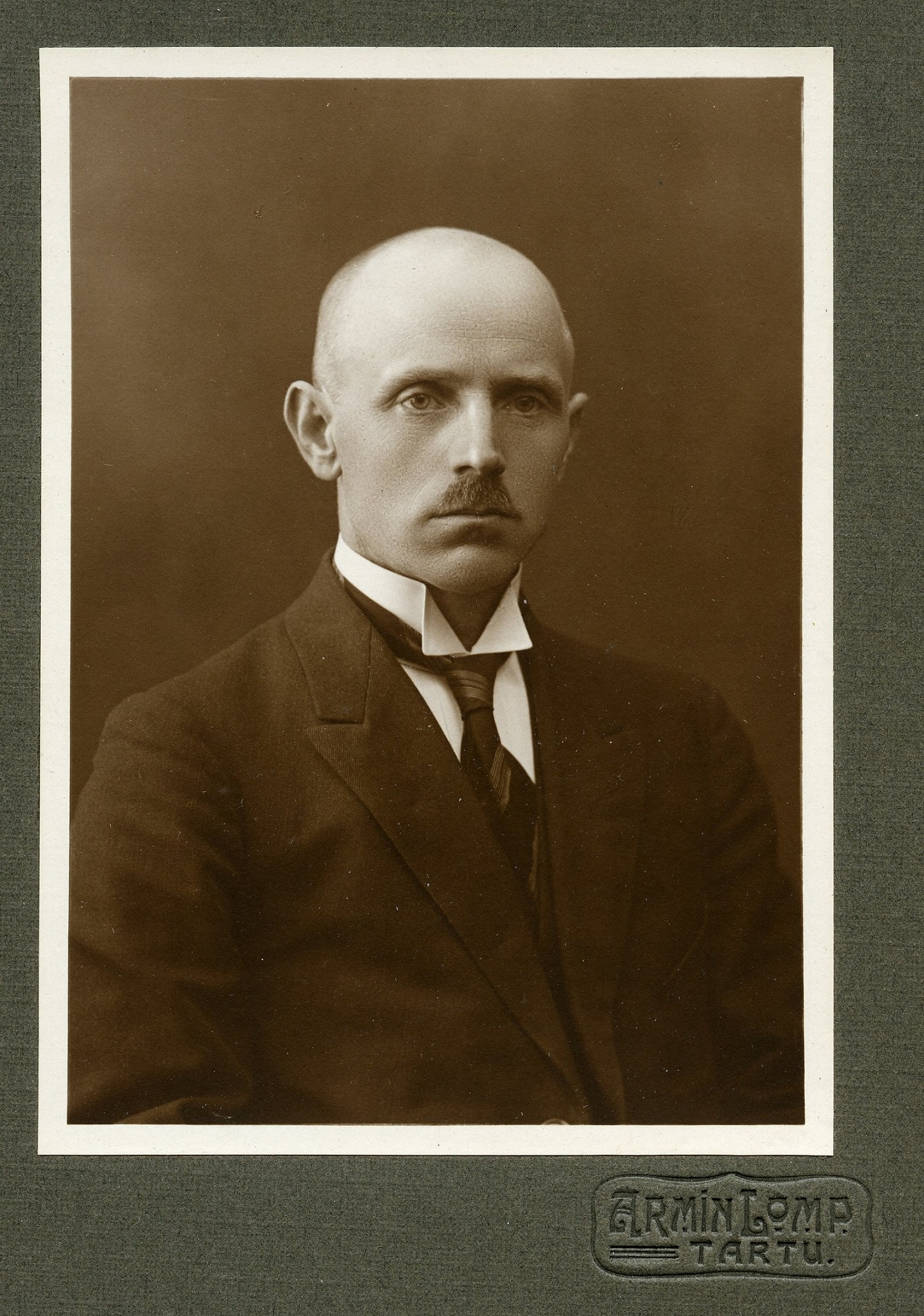
Karl Luik

Karl Julius Luik (12 July 1883 in Koikküla Parish (now Valga Parish), Kreis Werro – 5 March 1948 in Tobolsk, Russia) was an Estonian politician. He was a member of Estonian National Assembly (Estonian: Rahvuskogu) and Mayor of Tartu from 1920 until 1934.

== Early life and career ==
Luik first studied at Koikküla, Karula and Rõuge Parish schools and graduated from Hugo Treffner Gymnasium in Tartu. From 1906 until 1913 studied at the University of Tartu's Faculty of Physics and Mathematics, graduating with a degree in mathematics.

After graduation, he worked as a teacher in Valga and Võru. In 1920, he was elected Mayor of Tartu, a position he held until 1934. During his tenure as mayor, the city was extensively reshaped; a series of new public buildings were erected, including the neoclassical Tartu Market Hall, a city swimming pool, a city bank, the city pharmacy and several schoolhouses. The neighborhood of Tammelinn was designed and created, and the neighborhoods of Tähtvere and Veeriku were redesigned and expanded. Freedom Bridge (Vabadussild) over the Emajõgi in the center of the city, which was badly damaged by a fire in 1923, was rebuilt and reopened in 1926 and the first public fountain in Tartu was erected on Barclay Square in the city center. Bus traffic began in the city and a new water supply system was built, as well as the Ulila power plant, which has been supplying electricity to the city of Tartu since 1929, was renovated.

In 1937, Luik was elected to the Estonian National Assembly (Rahvuskogu).

== Arrest and death ==
After leaving the city government in 1940, Luik worked in Tartu as a mathematics teacher. In March 1945, following the Soviet occupation and annexation of Estonia, Luik was arrested by the NKVD and deported Tyumen Oblast, Russian Soviet Federative Socialist Republic, where he died in 1948 in Tobolsk of tuberculosis while serving a five-year sentence.

== Personal life ==
Karl Luik was married to Helene Kaas and the couple had three children; two daughters and a son.

== Acknowledgements ==
In 1930, Luik was awarded the Order of the Cross of the Eagle, V Class.

During Luik's lifetime, sculptor Ferdi Sannamees created a bust of Luik, which is located in the collection of the Tartu Art Museum. In 2016, the Tartu City Government decided to erect a monument to Luik in Vanemuine Park. The monument's bust was created by Tõnis Paberit, the architect of the monument was Uku Põllumaa. The monument was opened to the public on 29 June 2016, Tartu City Day, by Tartu mayor Urmas Klaas.
