= Rebasemoisa =

Rebasemoisa may refer to:

- Rebasemõisa, village in Valga County, Estonia
- Rebäsemõisa, village in Võru County, Estonia
