= Supa =

Supa may refer to:

== Geography ==
- Supa Dam, Western Ghats, Karnataka, India
- Joida, new settlement for the people from the defunct town Supa. Supa town was immersed due to the construction of Supa Dam
- Supa, Parner, village in Maharashtra, India
- Supa, Estonia a village in Southern Estonia.

== People ==
- Hilaria Supa (born 1957), Peruvian politician and human rights activist
- Richard Supa, American songwriter
