= Koiva (disambiguation) =

Koiva is a village in Estonia.

Koiva may also refer to:

- Gauja, the river known as Koiva in Estonian and Livonian
- Alternative transliteration for Russian "Koyva"
- Meeli Kõiva, Estonian artist
