= Koobassaare =

Village in Estonia

- Location within Estonia
- Coordinates: 57°41′17″N 26°24′56″E
- Country: Estonia
- County: Valga County
- Time zone: UTC+2 (EET)

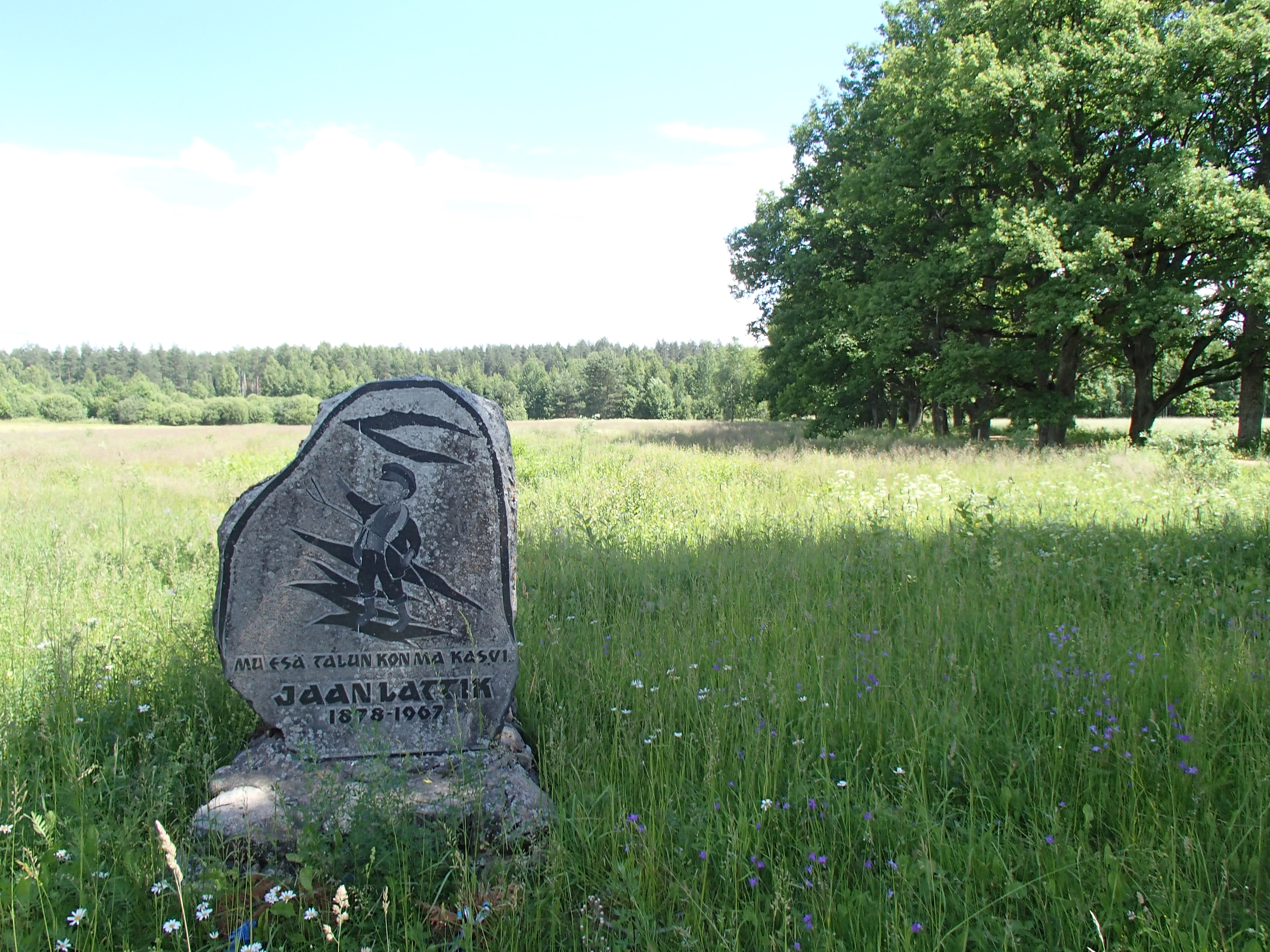
At Jaan Lattik’s childhood home in Koobassaare

Koobassaare is a settlement in Valga Parish, Valga County in southeastern Estonia.
