= Karula, Valga County =

Village in Estonia

- Village
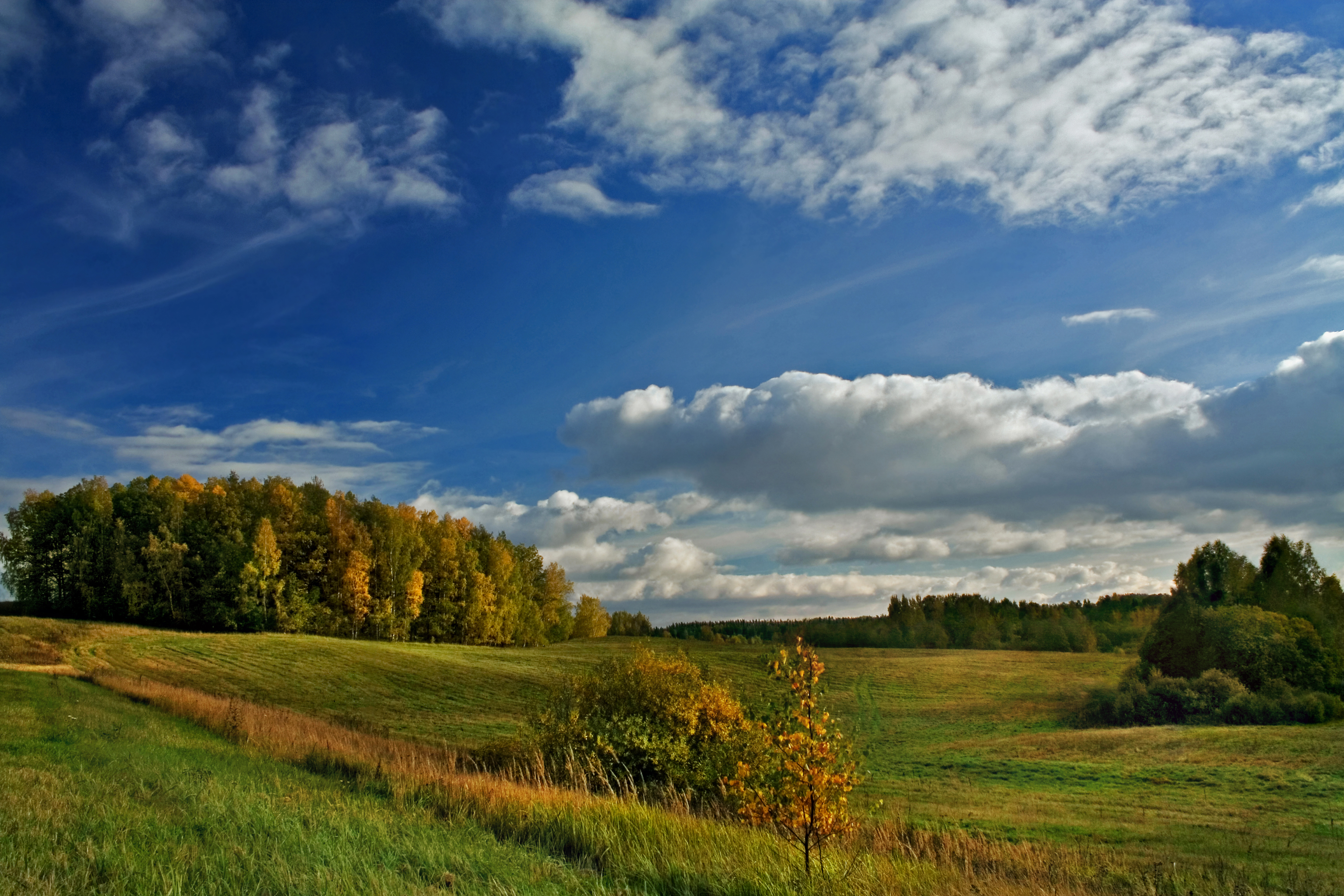
- Countryside in Karula

- Location within Estonia
- Coordinates: 57.756111111111°N 26.3075°E
- Country: Estonia
- County: Valga County
- Parish: Valga Parish
- Time zone: UTC+2 (EET)
  - Summer (DST): UTC+3 (EEST)

Karula (German: Karolen) is a village in Valga Parish, Valga County in Estonia.
