= Raavitsa =

Village in Estonia

- village
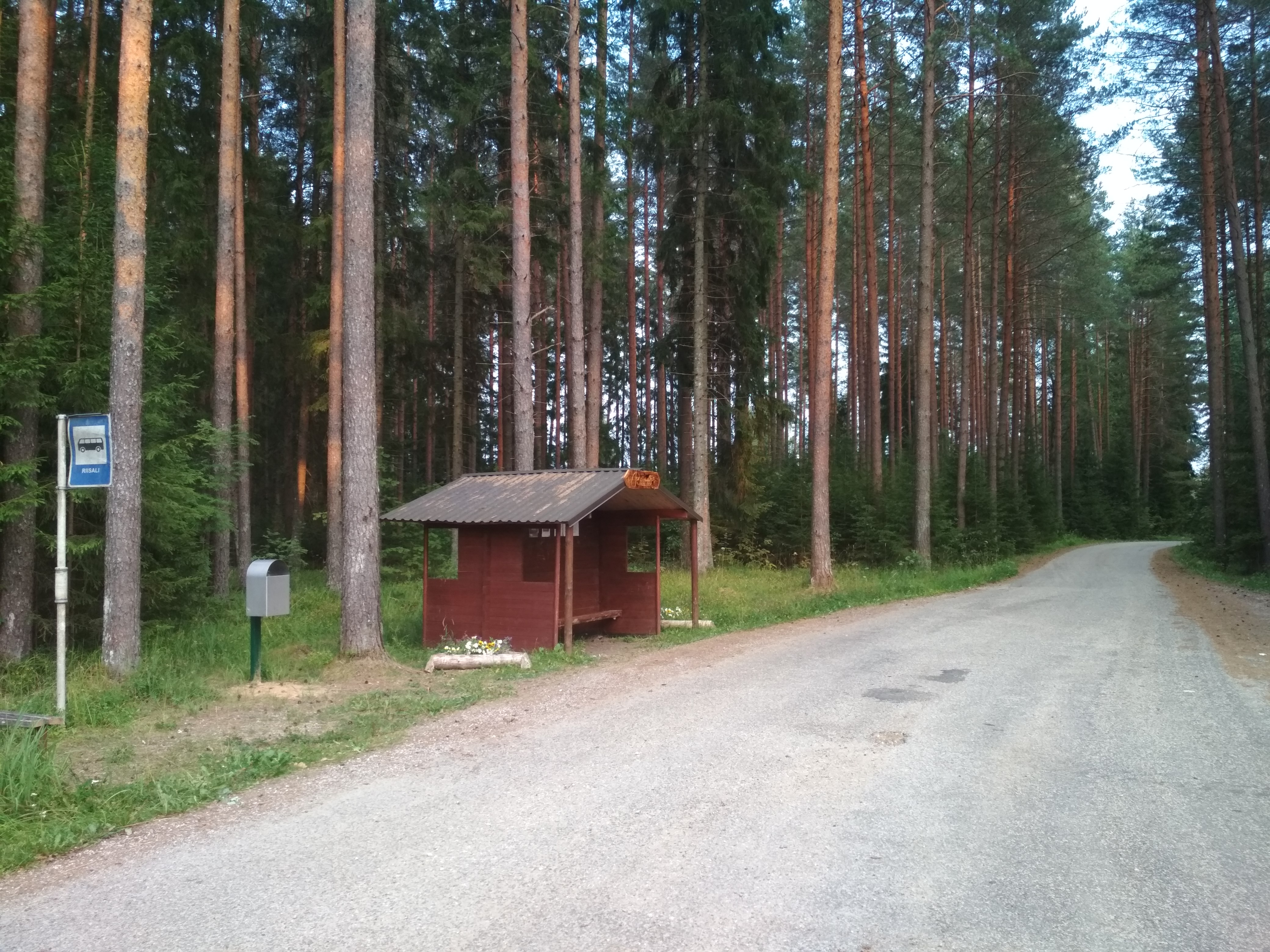
- "Riisali" bus stop in Raavitsa village

- Location in Estonia
- Coordinates: 57°48′01″N 26°10′12″E
- Country: Estonia
- County: Valga County
- Municipality: Valga Parish

Population (26.05.2004)
  - Total: 67

Raavitsa (also known as Raavitse) is a village in Valga Parish, Valga County, in southeastern Estonia. It borders the town of Valga in the west, Tartu–Valga railway in the northwest and Valga–Pechory railway in the south. Raavitsa has an unused station named "Raavitse" on Tartu–Valga line.

The centre of Valga is 5 km away, it's accessible via Tambre tee.

Raavitsa has a population of 67 (as of 1 January 2004).
