= Londi =

Village in Estonia

- village
- Location in Estonia
- Coordinates: 57°45′19″N 26°09′21″E
- Country: Estonia
- County: Valga County
- Municipality: Valga Parish

Population (26.05.2004)
  - Total: 22

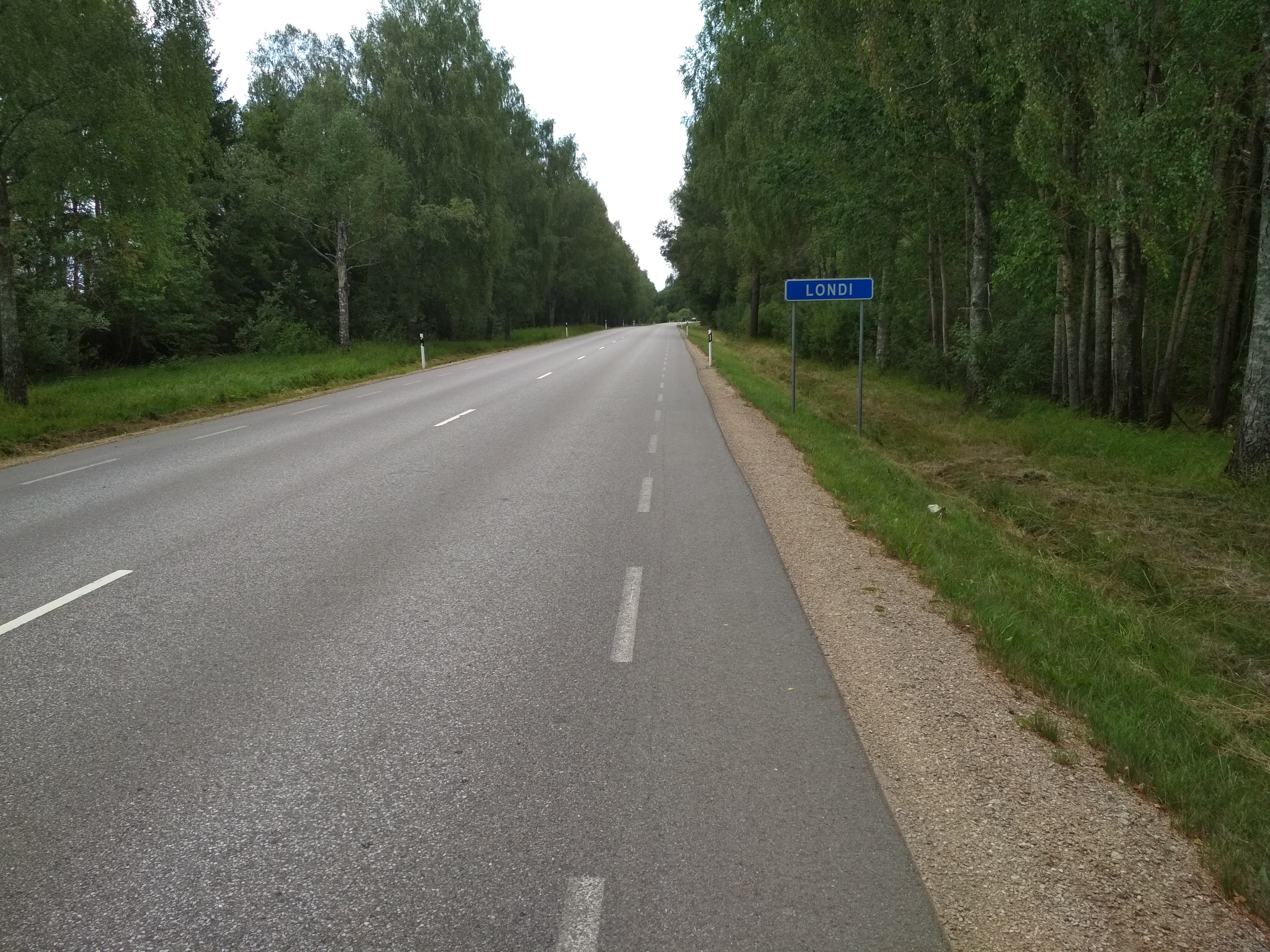

Londi is a village in Valga Parish, Valga County, in southeastern Estonia. It borders the town of Valga in the northwest, Estonia–Latvia border in the southwest and Valga–Pechory railway in the north. It has a population of 22 (as of 1 January 2004).

The centre of Valga is 7 km away, it's accessible via the Võru road.
