= Väheru =

Village in Estonia

- village
- Location in Estonia
- Coordinates: 57°47′46″N 26°18′30″E
- Country: Estonia
- County: Valga County
- Municipality: Valga Parish

Population (26.05.2004)
  - Total: 83

Väheru is a village in Valga Parish, Valga County, in southeastern Estonia. It has a population of 83 (as of 1 January 2004).

Väheru has a station on currently inactive Valga–Pechory railway.
