= Pugritsa =

Village in Estonia

- village
- Location in Estonia
- Coordinates: 57°44′46″N 26°13′41″E
- Country: Estonia
- County: Valga County
- Municipality: Valga Parish

Population (26.05.2004)
  - Total: 40

Pugritsa is a village in Valga Parish, Valga County, in southeastern Estonia. It is located about 10 km southeast of the town of Valga, it also borders Latvia on its southwestern side. Pugritsa has a population of 40 (as of 1 January 2004).
