= Tõlliste =

Village in Estonia

- Village
- Location in Estonia
- Coordinates: 57°51′24″N 26°10′07″E
- Country: Estonia
- County: Valga County
- Municipality: Valga Parish

Population (1 January 2010)
  - Total: 105

Tõlliste is a village in Valga Parish, Valga County in southern Estonia. It has a population of 105 (as of 1 January 2010). Prior to the 2017 administrative reform of Estonian local governments, Tõlliste was located in Tõlliste Parish.

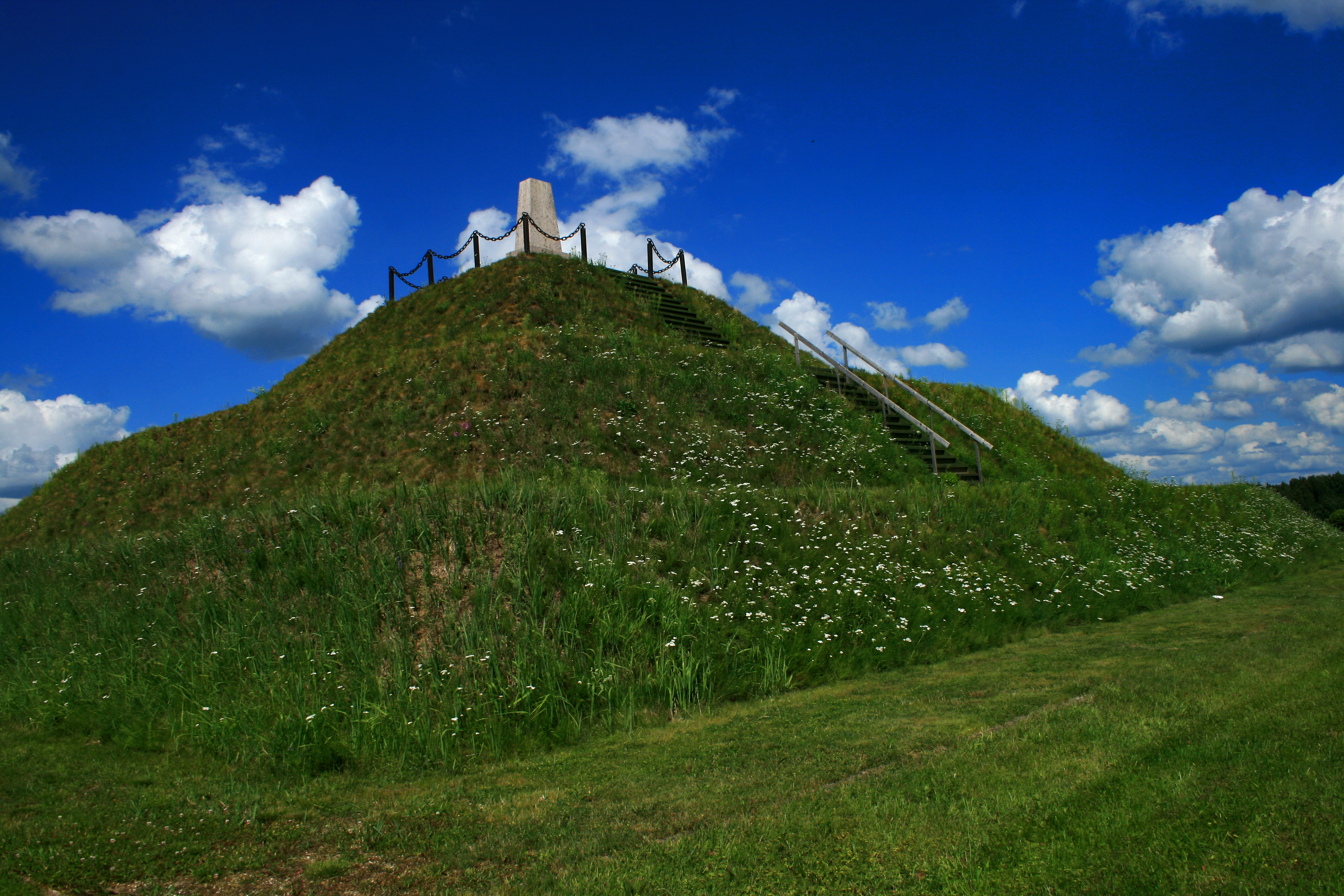
Memorial to the Battle of Paju near Tõlliste
