= Käärikmäe =

Village in Estonia

- Location within Estonia
- Coordinates: 57°45′28″N 26°20′49″E
- Country: Estonia
- County: Valga County
- Time zone: UTC+2 (EET)

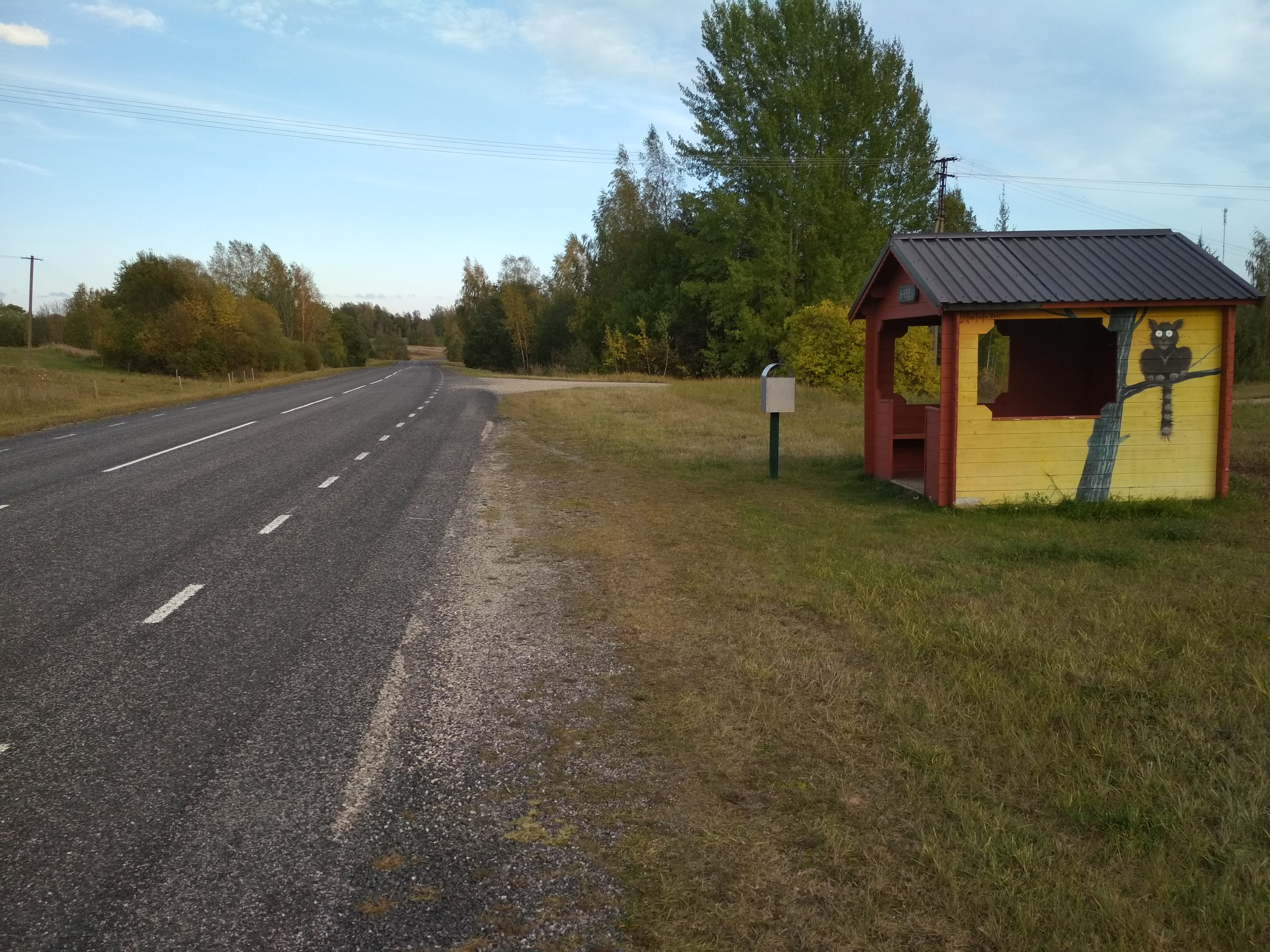
A bus stop in the settlement

Käärikmäe is a settlement in Valga Parish, Valga County in southern Estonia.
