= Rampe =

Village in Estonia

- Village
- Location in Estonia
- Coordinates: 57°51′50″N 26°13′20″E
- Country: Estonia
- County: Valga County
- Municipality: Valga Parish

Population (1 January 2010)
  - Total: 63

Rampe is a village in Valga Parish, Valga County in southern Estonia. It has a population of 63 (as of 1 January 2010).

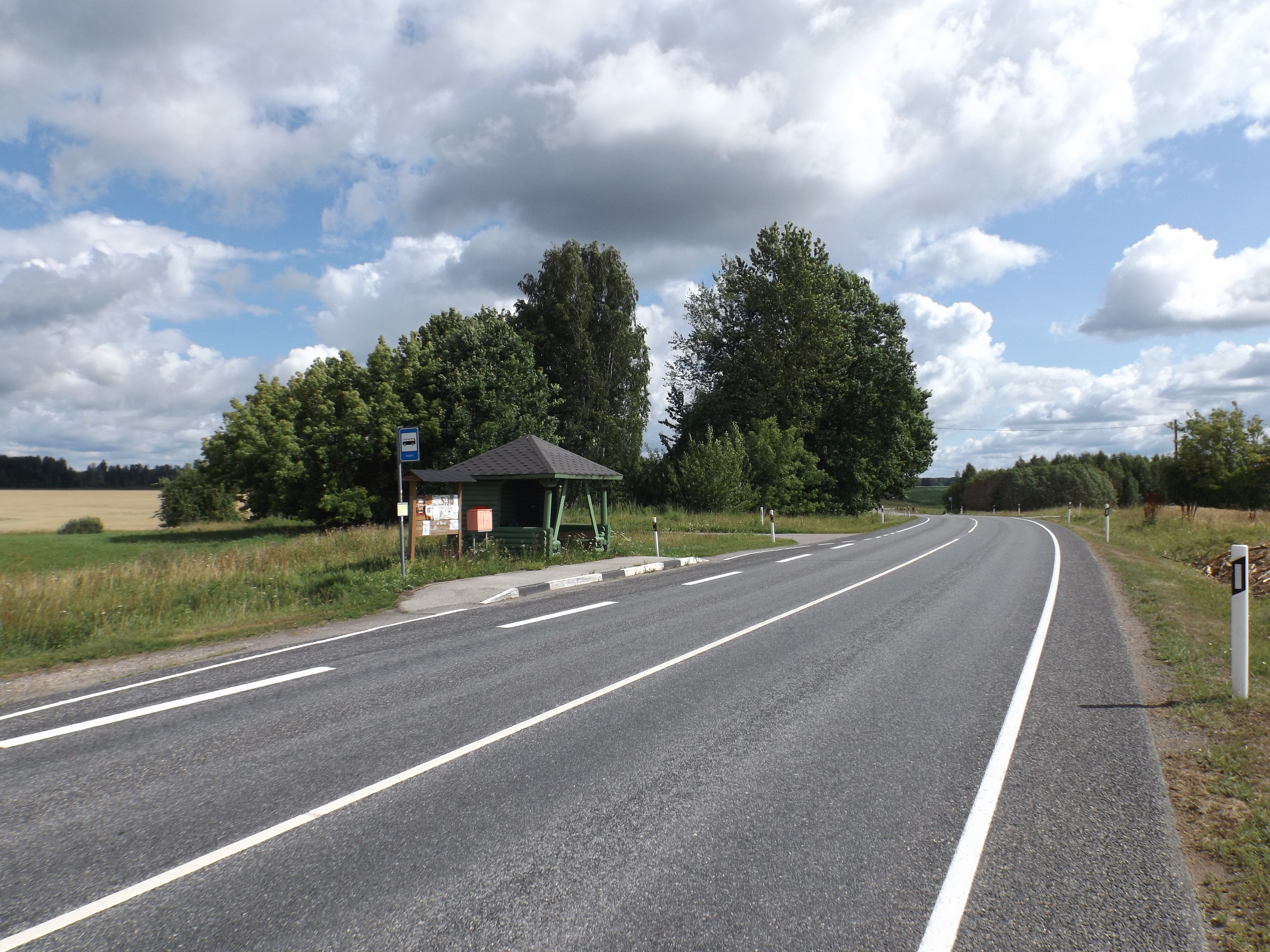
Rampe
