= Taheva =

Village in Estonia

- Location within Estonia
- Coordinates: 57°37′47″N 26°20′15″E
- Country: Estonia
- County: Valga County
- Time zone: UTC+2 (EET)

Taheva is a settlement in Valga Parish, Valga County in southeastern Estonia.

Until the beginning of the 1970s, the Valga–Mõniste–Ape–Alūksne–Gulbene narrow-gauge railway going to Latvia passed through the village and there was a railway station in the village.

The Taheva sanatorium is located on the territory of the neighboring Tsirgumäe village, and the building complex of the Taheva manor is also located in the neighborhood of the village.

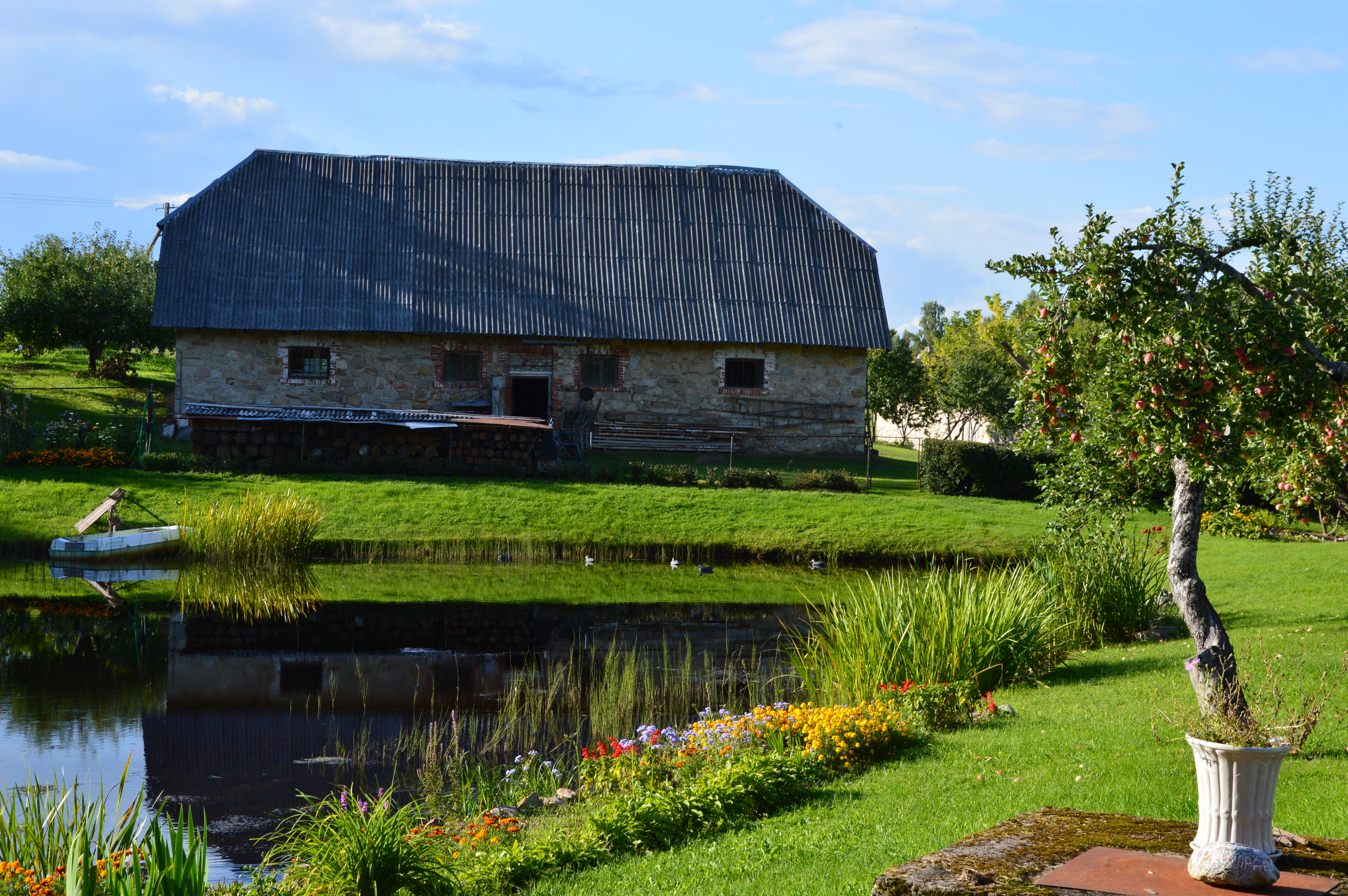
Taheva manor spirits cellar

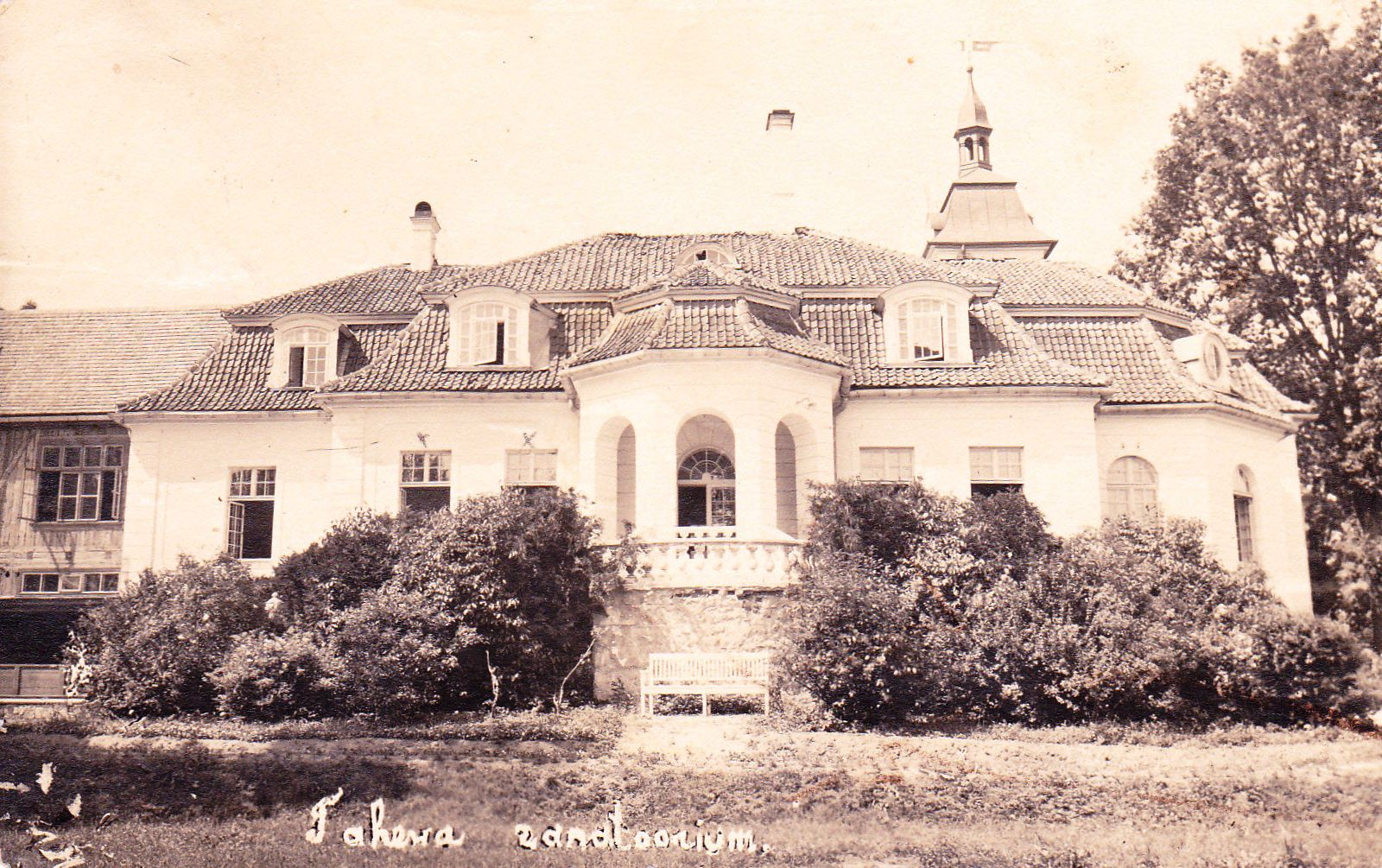
One of the buildings of Taheva manor

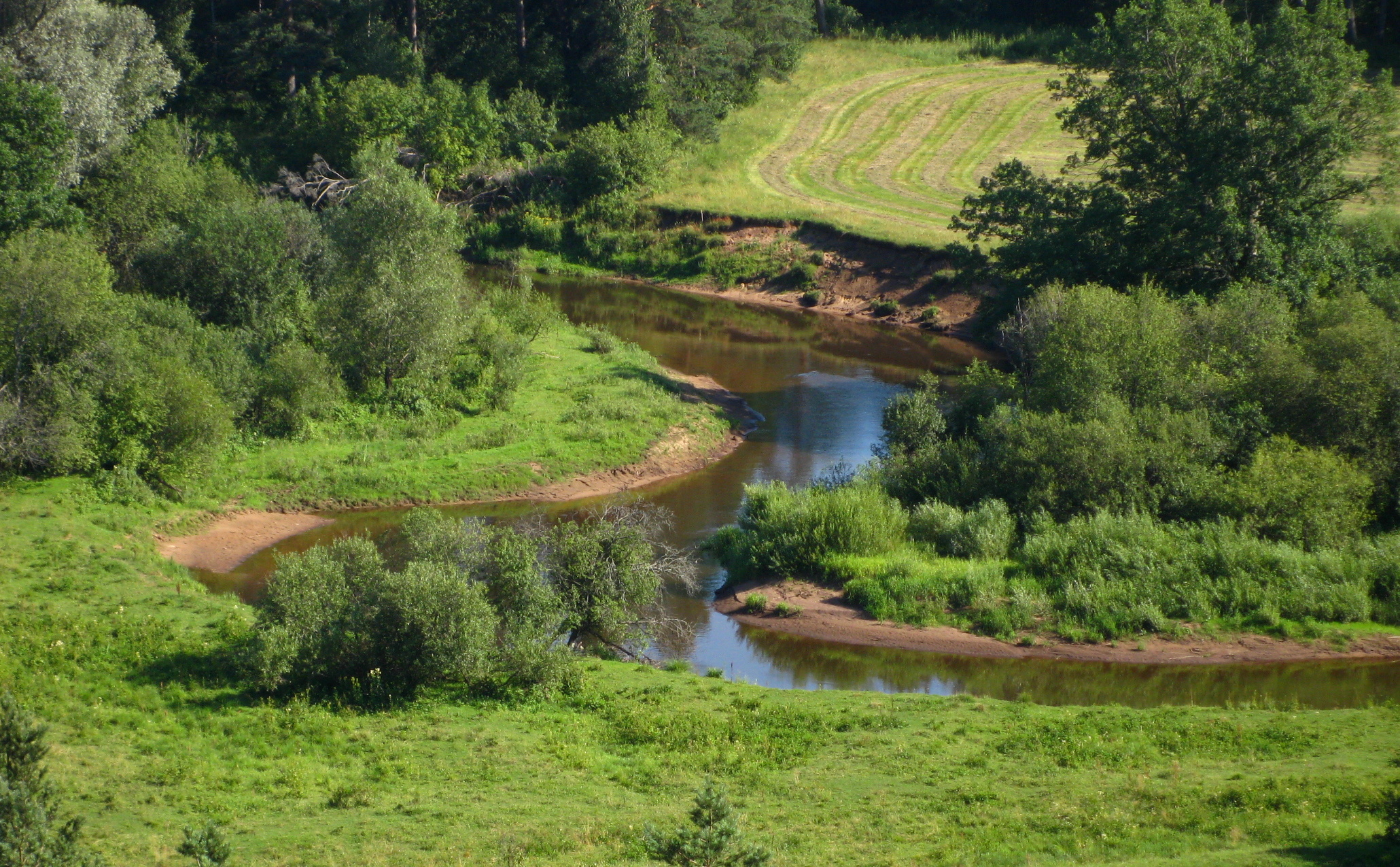
Mustjõgi river near Taheva
