= Tõrvase =

Village in Estonia

- Location within Estonia
- Coordinates: 57°35′0″N 26°28′0″E
- Country: Estonia
- County: Valga County
- Time zone: UTC+2 (EET)

Tõrvase is a settlement in Valga Parish, Valga County in southeastern Estonia.
