= Iigaste =

Village in Estonia

- Village
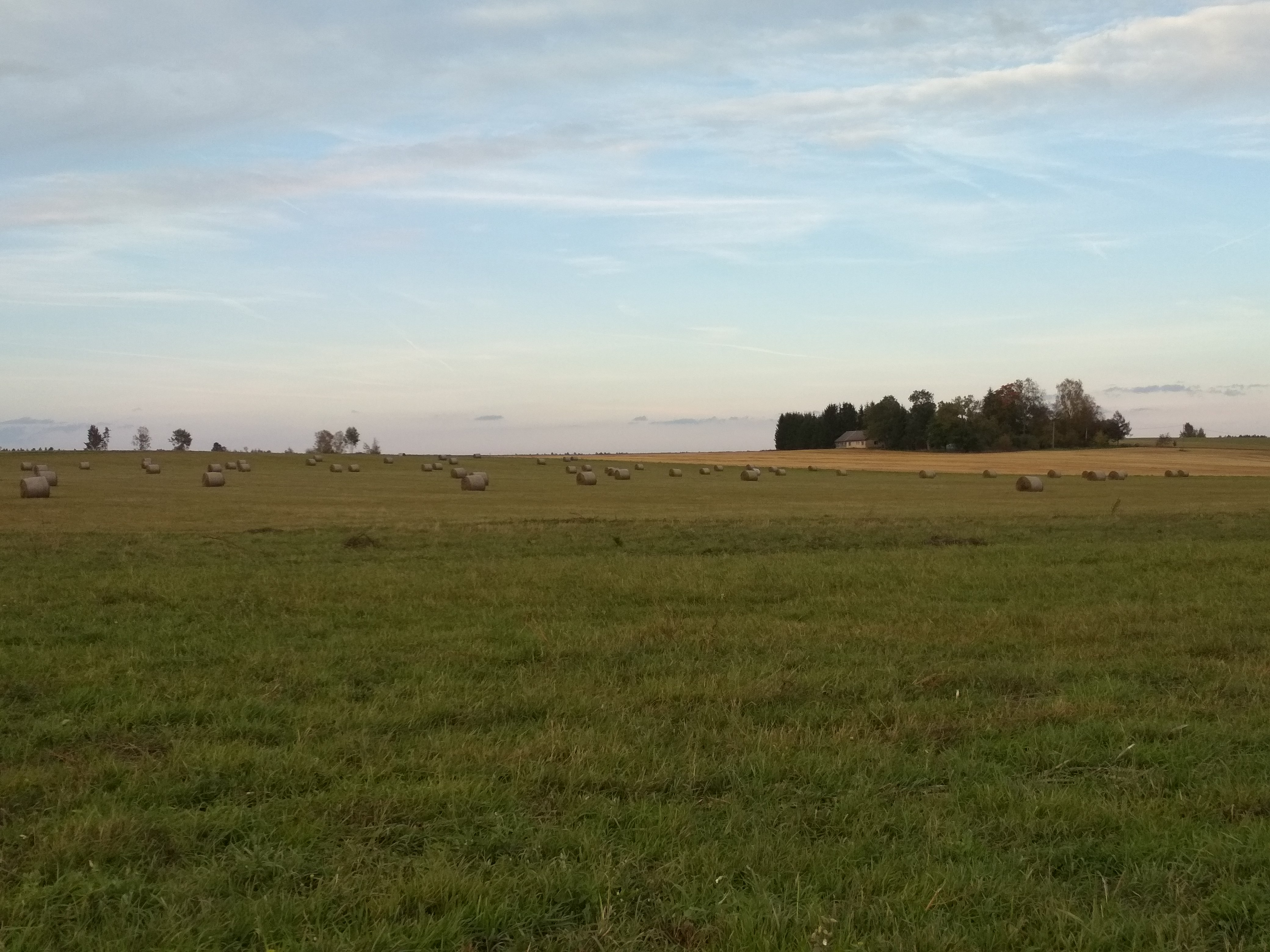
- A field near the village Iigaste, Estonia.

- Location within Estonia
- Coordinates: 57.833055555556°N 26.259722222222°E
- Country: Estonia
- County: Valga County
- Parish: Valga Parish
- Time zone: UTC+2 (EET)
  - Summer (DST): UTC+3 (EEST)

Iigaste is a village in Valga Parish, Valga County in Estonia.
