= Valga Parish =

Municipality of Estonia

Valga Parish Valga vald
- Municipality of Estonia
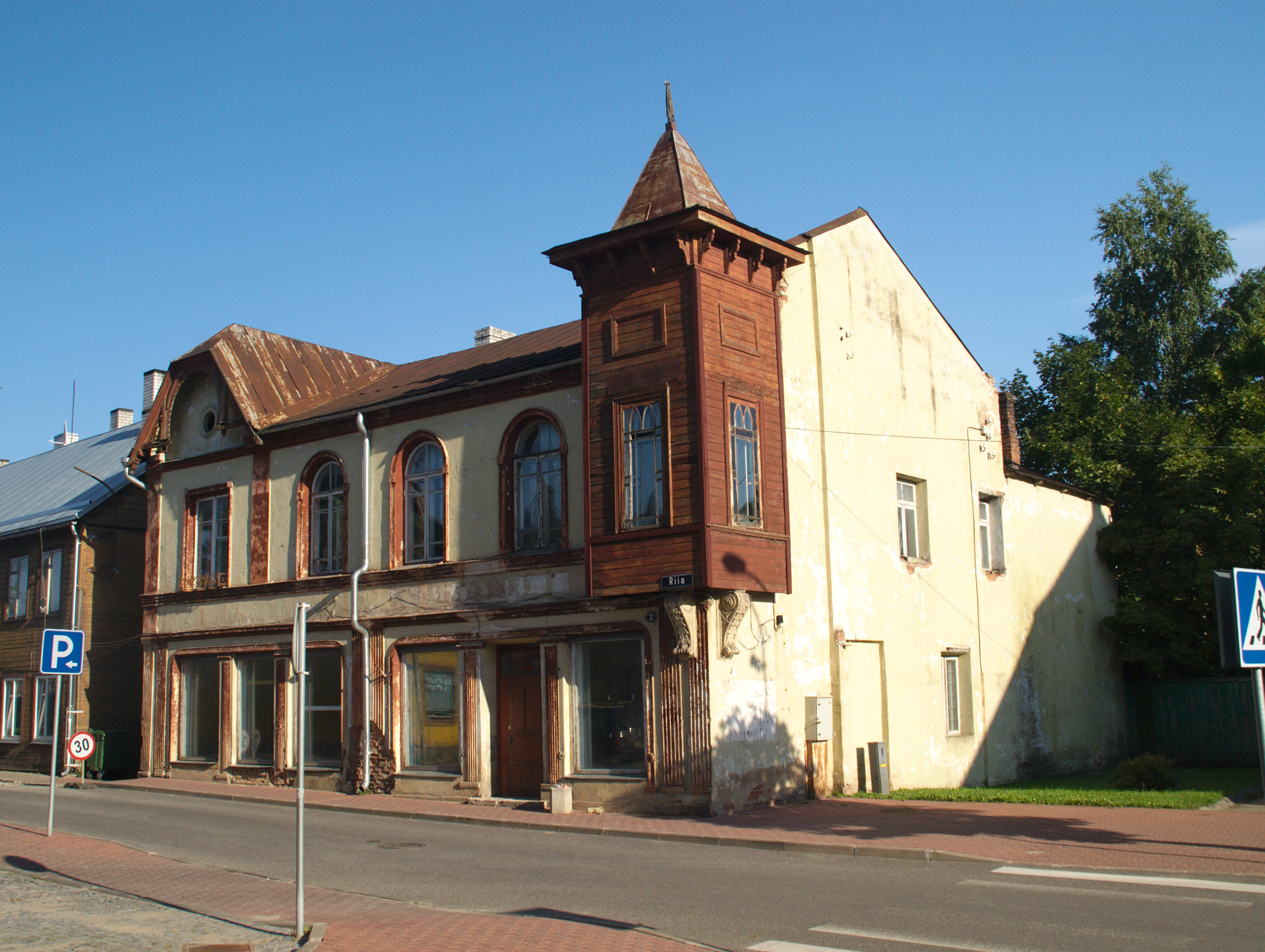
- Valga town

- Flag Coat of arms

- Valga Parish within Valga County.
- Country: Estonia
- County: Valga County
- Administrative centre: Valga

Government
  - Mayor: Mart Kase (Social Democratic Party)

Area
  - Total: 750 km^{2} (290 sq mi)

Population (01.01.2019)
  - Total: 15,785
  - Density: 21/km^{2} (55/sq mi)
- ISO 3166 code: EE-855
- Website: www.valga.ee

Valga Parish (Estonian: Valga vald) is a rural municipality in Valga County. It includes the town of Valga.

Valga was first mentioned in 1266 (Walk) in the credit register of the city of Riga. In 1584, it was granted town rights by Stefan Bathory and has been the center of regional administrative units at various times. The modern parish was formed in 2017 by merging the Valga town and neighboring rural municipalities. The landscape of the municipality is shaped by the Sakala, Otepää and Karula uplands, which are separated from each other by the Valga and Hargla valleys.

== Demographics ==
The municipality has one town, three small boroughs and numerous villages.

=== Town ===
- Valga

=== Small boroughs ===
- Tsirguliina
- Õru
- Laatre

=== Villages ===
- Hargla
- Iigaste
- Jaanikese
- Kaagjärve
- Kalliküla
- Karula
- Killinge
- Kirbu
- Kiviküla
- Koikküla
- Koiva
- Koobassaare
- Korijärve
- Korkuna
- Käärikmäe
- Laanemetsa
- Lepa
- Londi
- Lota
- Lusti
- Lutsu
- Lüllemäe
- Muhkva
- Mustumetsa
- Paju
- Pikkjärve
- Priipalu
- Pugritsa
- Raavitsa
- Rampe
- Rebasemõisa
- Ringiste
- Sooblase
- Sooru
- Supa
- Tagula
- Taheva
- Tinu
- Tsirgumäe
- Tõlliste
- Tõrvase
- Uniküla
- Valtina
- Vilaski
- Väheru
- Väljaküla
- Õlatu
- Õruste

=== Religion ===
The largest groups of people living in the municipality who identify themselves as religious are Orthodox and Lutheran Christians, although most of the adult residents of the parish are unaffiliated. There are also other religious communities in the municipality.

== Notable people ==
- Karl August Baars (1875 in Valga Parish – 1942), lawyer and politician, Minister of Justice 1921 & 1924
- Jaan Lattik (1878 near Karula Parish – 1967), politician, writer and Minister of Education and Minister of Foreign Affairs
- Karl Luik (1883 in Koikküla Parish – 1948), politician, Mayor of Tartu, 1920 to 1934.
- Anton Palvadre (1886 in Korijärve – 1942), lawyer and politician, one of the leaders of Estonian Socialist Workers' Party
- Alfred Käärmann (1922 in Hargla – 2010), resistance fighter, also known as a forest brother
- Rein Randver (born 1956 in Lüllemäe), politician, Minister of Environment from 2006 to 2007
