= Korijärve =

Village in Estonia

- village
- Location in Estonia
- Coordinates: 57°49′21″N 26°23′44″E
- Country: Estonia
- County: Valga County
- Municipality: Valga Parish
- First mentioned: 1582

Area
  - Total: 21.3 km^{2} (8.2 sq mi)

Population (01.01.2011)
  - Total: 51
  - Density: 2.4/km^{2} (6.2/sq mi)

Korijärve is a village in Valga Parish, Valga County, in southeastern Estonia. It has a population of 51 (as of 2011) and an area of 21.3 km².

Korijärve was first mentioned in 1582 as Korrigerwe.

The currently inactive Valga–Pechory railway passes Korijärve on its southern side, there's a station named "Tuulemäe".
