= Korkuna =

Village in Estonia

- Location within Estonia
- Coordinates: 57°38′25″N 26°18′46″E
- Country: Estonia
- County: Valga County
- Time zone: UTC+2 (EET)

Korkuna is a village in Valga Parish, Valga County in southeastern Estonia.
