= Muhkva =

Village in Estonia

- Village
- Location within Estonia
- Coordinates: 57.8592°N 26.2703°E
- Country: Estonia
- County: Valga County
- Parish: Valga Parish
- Time zone: UTC+2 (EET)
  - Summer (DST): UTC+3 (EEST)

Muhkva is a village in Valga Parish, Valga County in Estonia.
