= Tinu =

Village in Tõlliste Parish, Valga County in southern Estonia

- Village
- Location in Estonia
- Coordinates: 57°50′39″N 26°11′18″E
- Country: Estonia
- County: Valga County
- Municipality: Valga Parish

Population (31 December 2011)
  - Total: 4

Tinu is a village in Valga Parish, Valga County in southern Estonia. It has a population of 4 (as of 31 December 2011).
