= Väljaküla, Valga County =

Village in Estonia

Väljaküla
- Village
- Location in Estonia
- Coordinates: 57°52′51″N 26°14′56″E
- Country: Estonia
- County: Valga County
- Municipality: Valga Parish

Population (1 January 2010)
  - Total: 71

Väljaküla is a village in Valga Parish, Valga County in southern Estonia. It has a population of 71 (as of 1 January 2010).
