= Rebasemõisa =

Village in Estonia

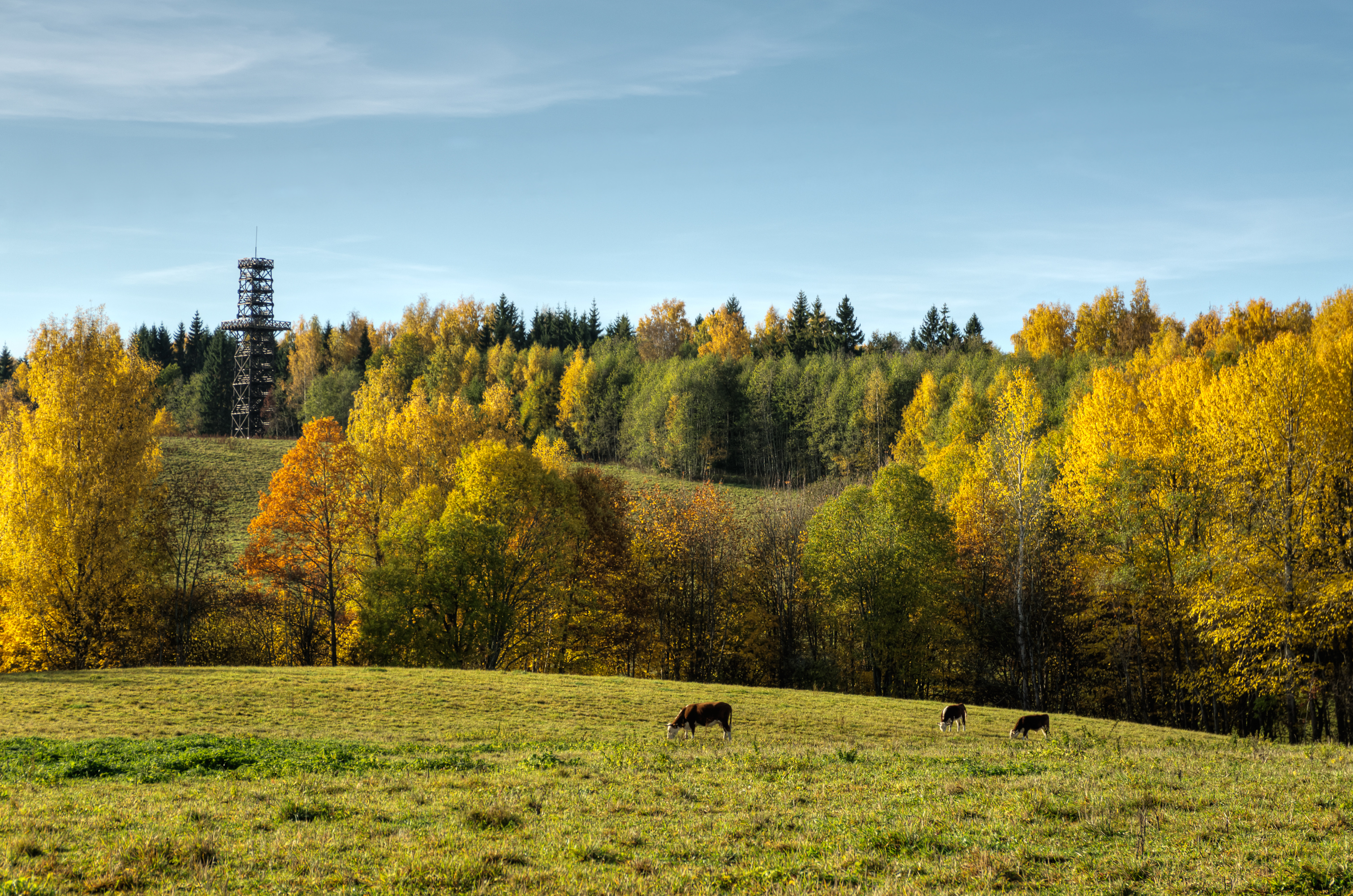
- Rebasemõisa observation tower and landscape

- Location within Estonia
- Coordinates: 57°44′50″N 26°24′49″E
- Country: Estonia
- County: Valga County
- Time zone: UTC+2 (EET)

Rebasemõisa (German: Repsberg) is a settlement in Valga Parish, Valga County in southern Estonia.
