= Tagula =

Village in Estonia

- Village
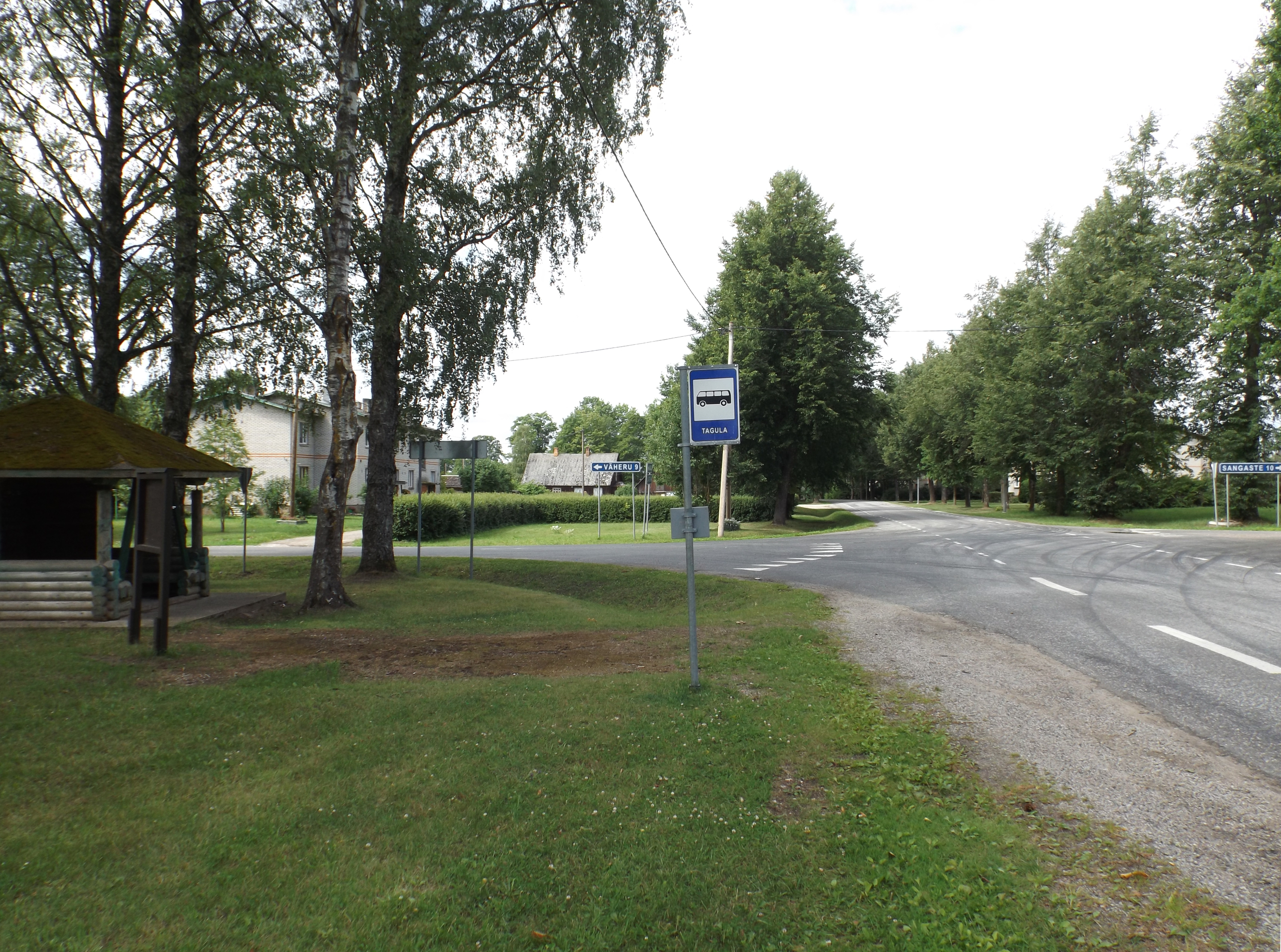
- Tagula

- Location in Estonia
- Coordinates: 57°51′21″N 26°22′37″E
- Country: Estonia
- County: Valga County
- Municipality: Valga Parish

Population (1 January 2010)
  - Total: 192

Tagula is a village in Valga Parish, Valga County in southern Estonia. It has a population of 192 (as of 1 January 2010).
