= Lutsu, Valga County =

Village in Estonia

Lutsu
- Location within Estonia
- Coordinates: 57°43′24″N 26°16′57″E
- Country: Estonia
- County: Valga County
- Municipality: Valga Parish
- Time zone: UTC+2 (EET)

Lutsu is a settlement in Valga Parish, Valga County in southeastern Estonia.
