= Sooru =

Village in Estonia

- village
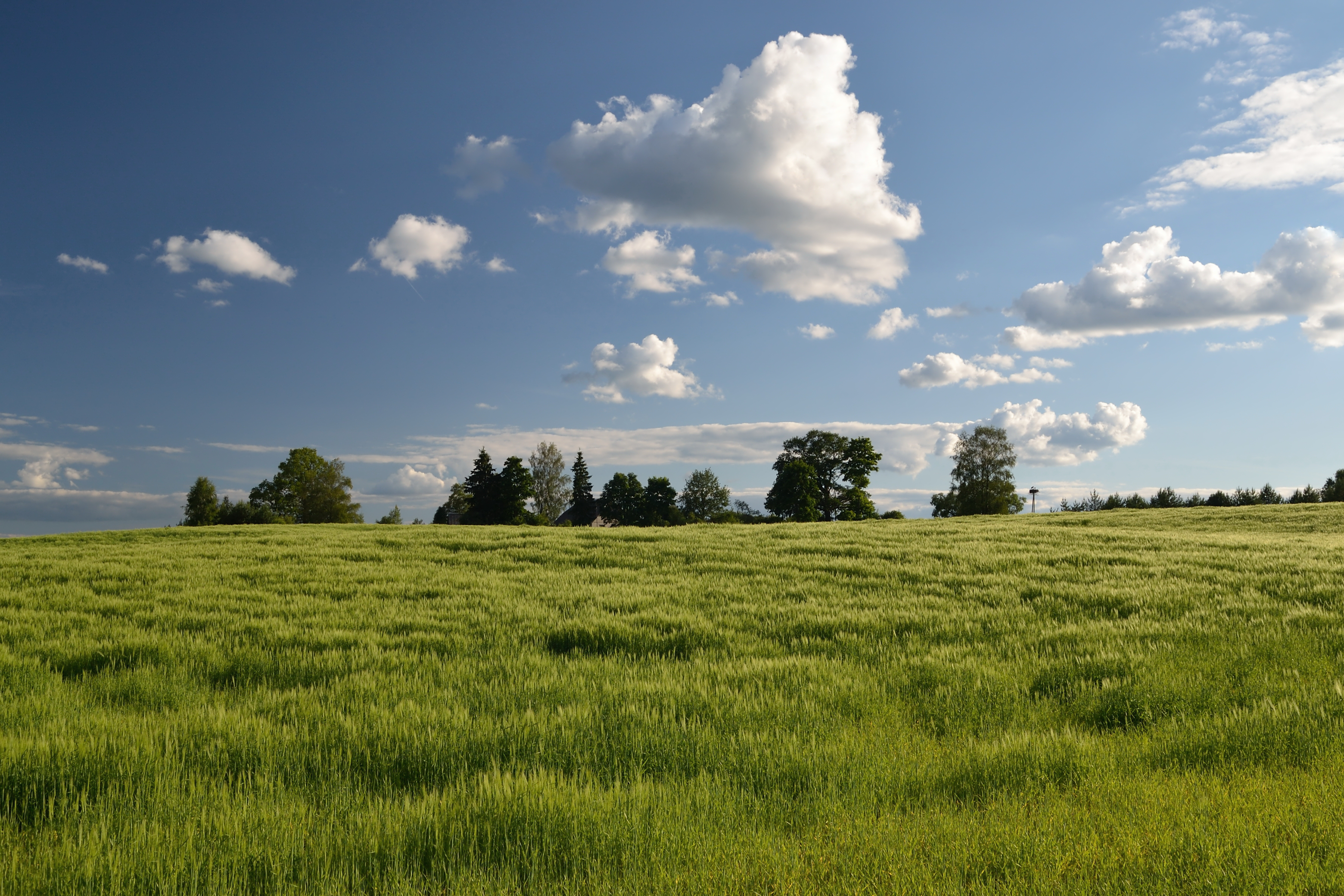
- Barley field in Sooru

- Location in Estonia
- Coordinates: 57°51′15″N 26°07′09″E
- Country: Estonia
- County: Valga County
- Municipality: Valga Parish
- First mentioned: 1388

Area
  - Total: 14.62 km^{2} (5.64 sq mi)

Population (01.01.2011)
  - Total: 295
  - Density: 20.2/km^{2} (52.3/sq mi)
- Website: www.sooru.ee

Sooru is a village in Valga Parish, Valga County in southern Estonia. It's located about 10 km northeast of the town of Valga. Sooru has a population of 295 (as of 2011) and an area of 14.62 km^{2}. Sooru borders the Väike Emajõgi River on its northeastern side.

Sooru Manor was first mentioned in 1388 as Sore (also known as Soorhof, Soor and Sora). Until its dispossession in 1920–1922 the manor had many owners. In 1922 a local elementary school was established in the manor house. The main building was burned down in 1944 during World War II.
