= Sooblase =

Village in Estonia

- Location within Estonia
- Coordinates: 57°36′37″N 26°21′35″E
- Country: Estonia
- County: Valga County
- Time zone: UTC+2 (EET)

Sooblase is a settlement in Valga Parish, Valga County in southeastern Estonia.
