= Kirbu, Valga County =

Village in Estonia

- Village
- Location within Estonia
- Coordinates: 57.774444444444°N 26.344166666667°E
- Country: Estonia
- County: Valga County
- Parish: Valga Parish
- Time zone: UTC+2 (EET)
  - Summer (DST): UTC+3 (EEST)

Kirbu is a village in Valga Parish, Valga County in Estonia.
