= Priipalu =

Village in Estonia

- Village
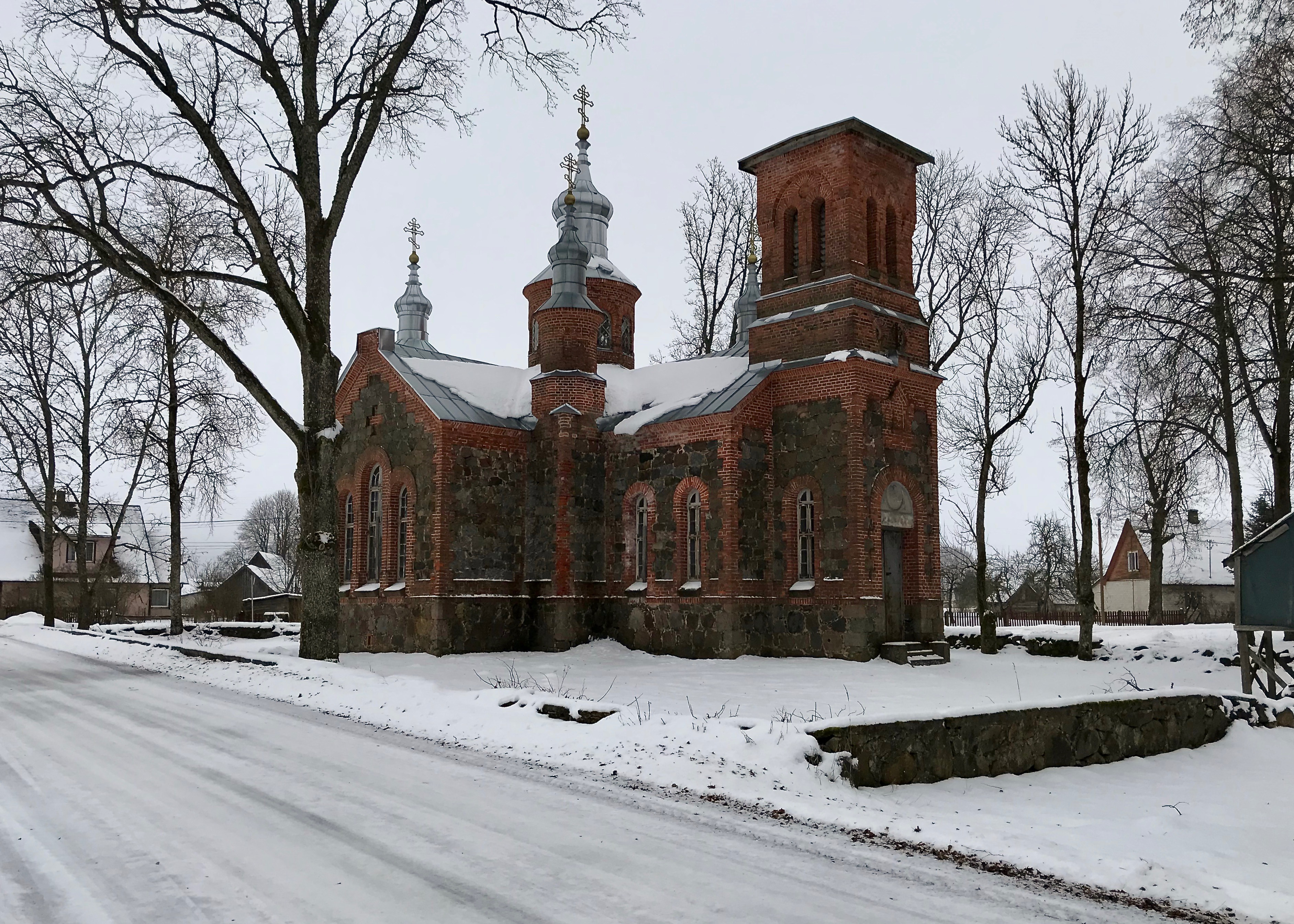
- Priipalu St. Basil the Great church

- Location within Estonia
- Coordinates: 57.9839°N 26.1783°E
- Country: Estonia
- County: Valga County
- Parish: Valga Parish
- Time zone: UTC+2 (EET)
  - Summer (DST): UTC+3 (EEST)

Priipalu is a village in Valga Parish, Valga County in Estonia.
