= Tsirgumäe =

Village in Estonia

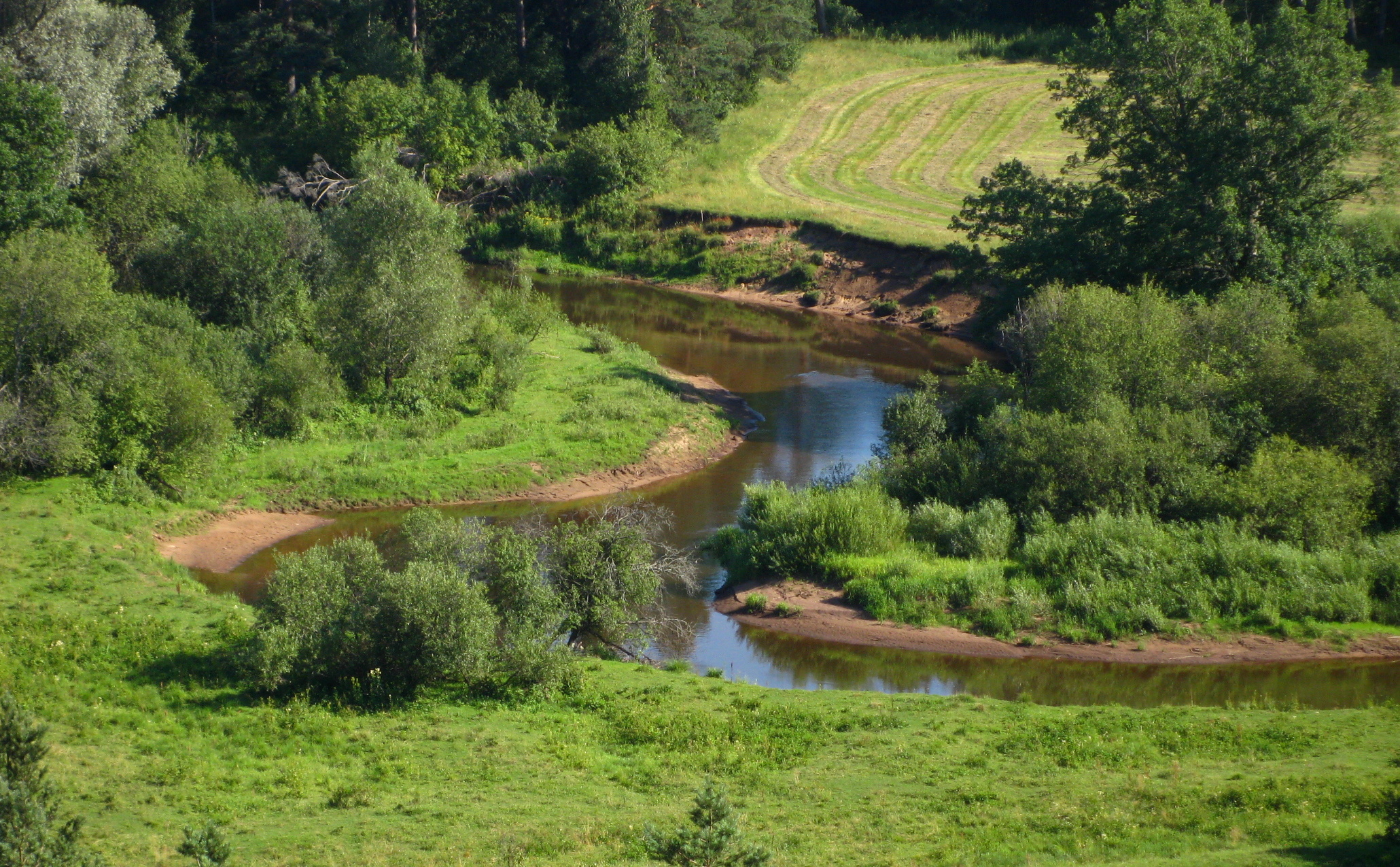
- The Mustjõgi, a river in Tsirgumäe

- Location within Estonia
- Coordinates: 57°36′22″N 26°19′52″E
- Country: Estonia
- County: Valga County
- Time zone: UTC+2 (EET)

Tsirgumäe is a settlement in Valga Parish, Valga County in southeastern Estonia.

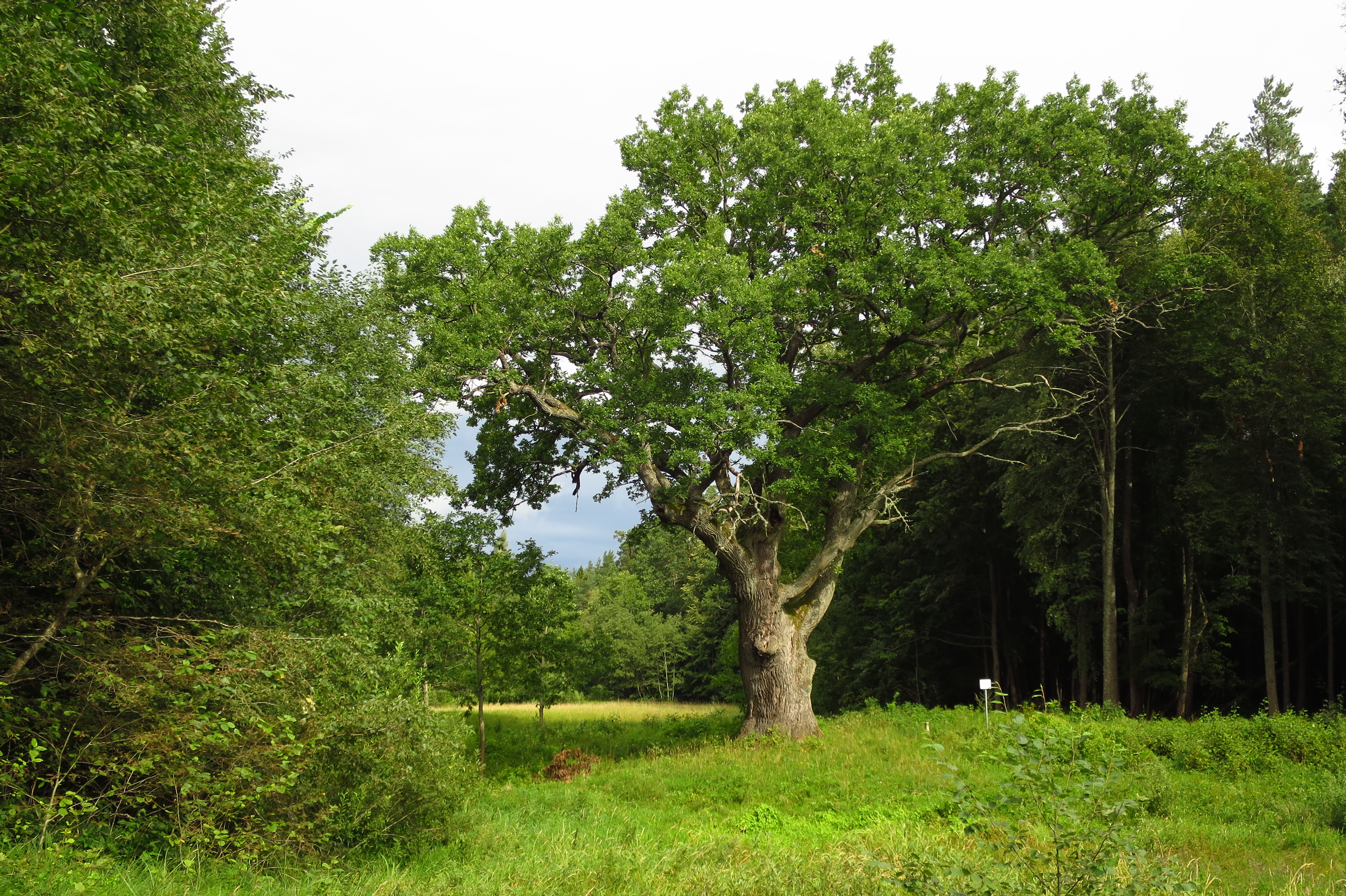
The Koiva oak.
