= Koikküla =

Village in Estonia

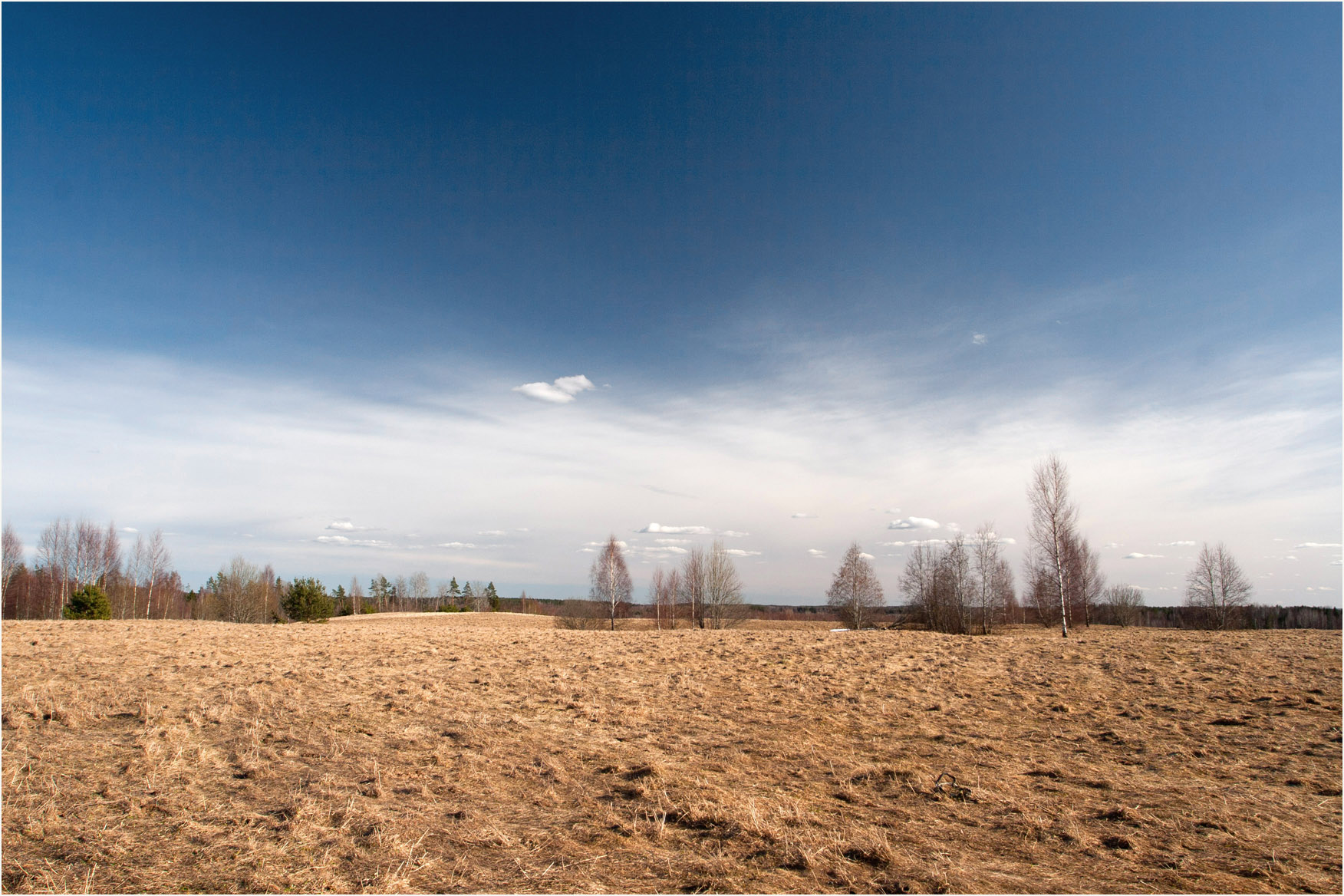
- Koikküla, after a long winter, 2011

- Location within Estonia
- Coordinates: 57°41′23″N 26°16′54″E
- Country: Estonia
- County: Valga County
- Time zone: UTC+2 (EET)

Koikküla (German: Koiküll) is a settlement in Valga Parish, Valga County in southeastern Estonia.
