= Koiva =

Village in Estonia

Coordinates: 57°41′N 26°15′E

- Village
- Interactive map of Koiva
- Country: Estonia
- County: Valga County
- Parish: Valga Parish
- Time zone: UTC+2 (EET)
  - Summer (DST): UTC+3 (EEST)

Koiva is a village in Valga Parish, Valga County, in southern Estonia.
