= Supa, Estonia =

Village in Estonia

Supa
- Village
- Location in Estonia
- Coordinates: 57°50′36″N 26°07′49″E
- Country: Estonia
- County: Valga County
- Municipality: Valga Parish

Population (01.01.2010)
  - Total: 33

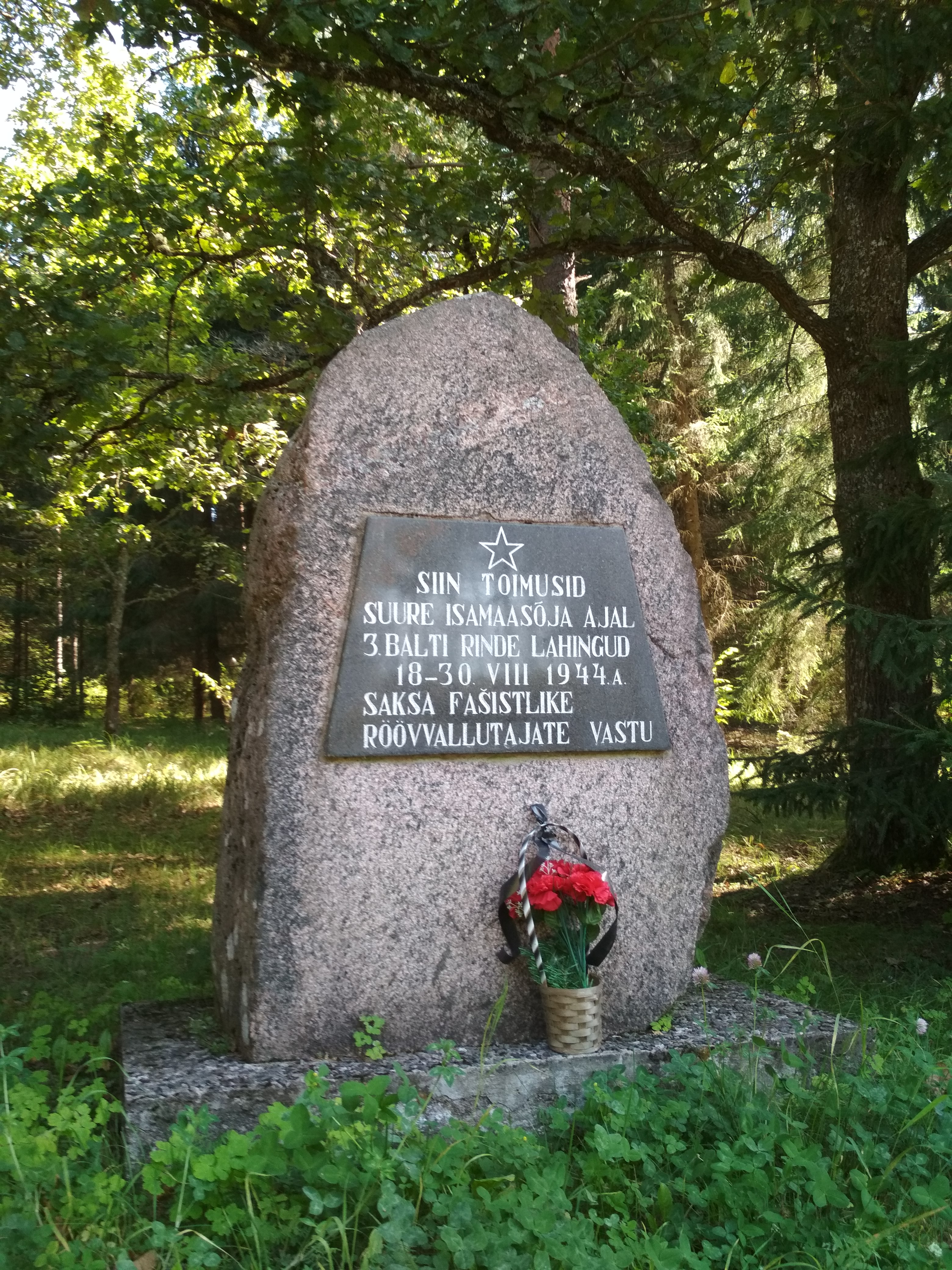
A World War 2 monument in Estonia, Supa village.

Supa is a village in Valga Parish, Valga County in southern Estonia. It has a population of 33 (as of 1 January 2010).
