= Pikkjärve, Valga County =

Village in Estonia

Pikkjarve
- village
- Location in Estonia
- Coordinates: 57°46′04″N 26°16′58″E
- Country: Estonia
- County: Valga County
- Municipality: Valga Parish

Population (26.05.2004)
  - Total: 27

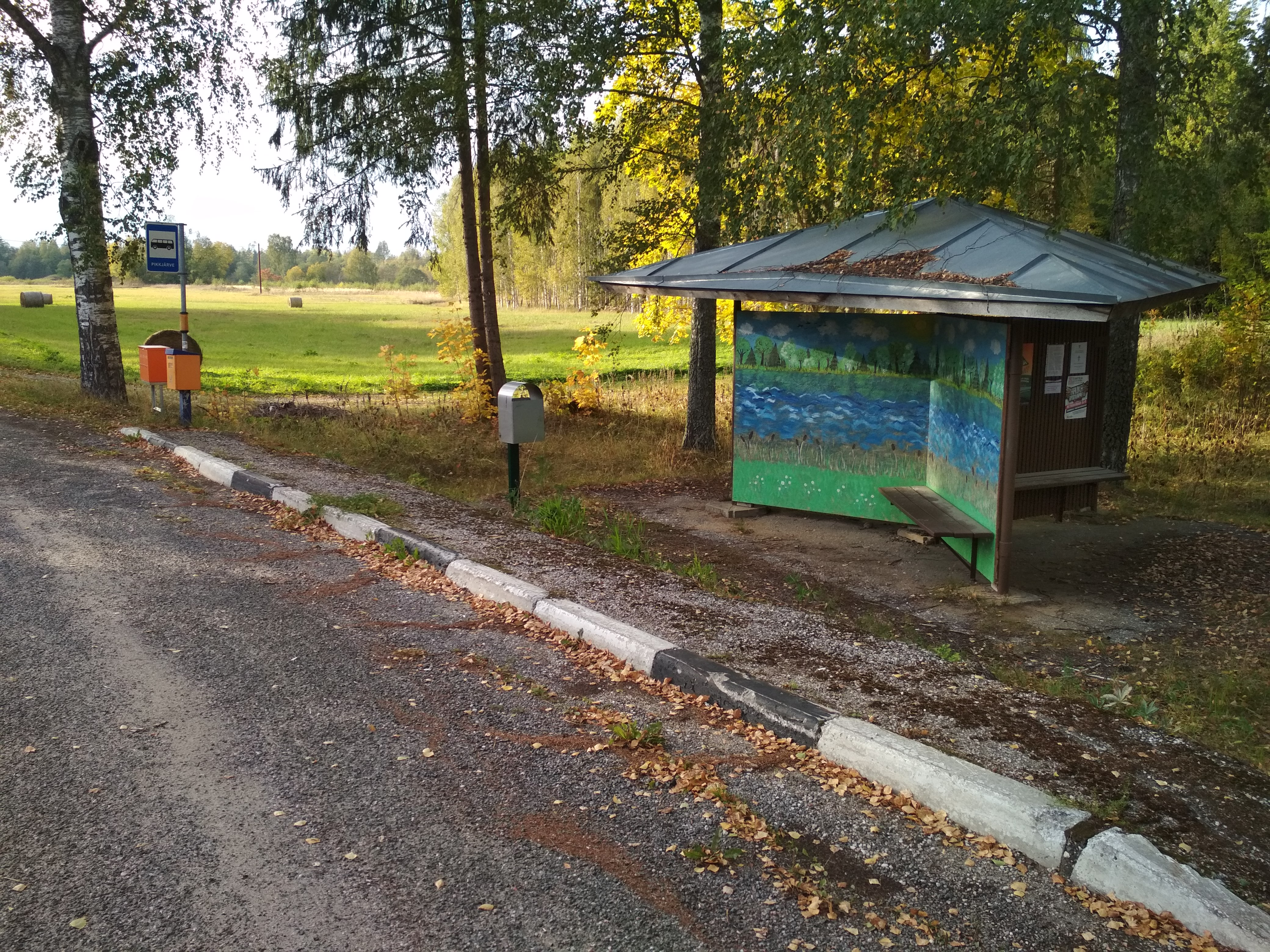
Pikkjärve bus stop

Pikkjärve (also known as Vissi, German: Langensee) is a village in Valga Parish, Valga County, in southeastern Estonia, located about 14 km east of the bordertown Valga. It has a population of 27 (as of 1 January 2004).

The currently inactive Valga–Pechory railway passes Pikkjärve on its northern side, there's a station named "Mürgi".
