= Marju Kõivupuu =

Estonian folklorist (born 1960)

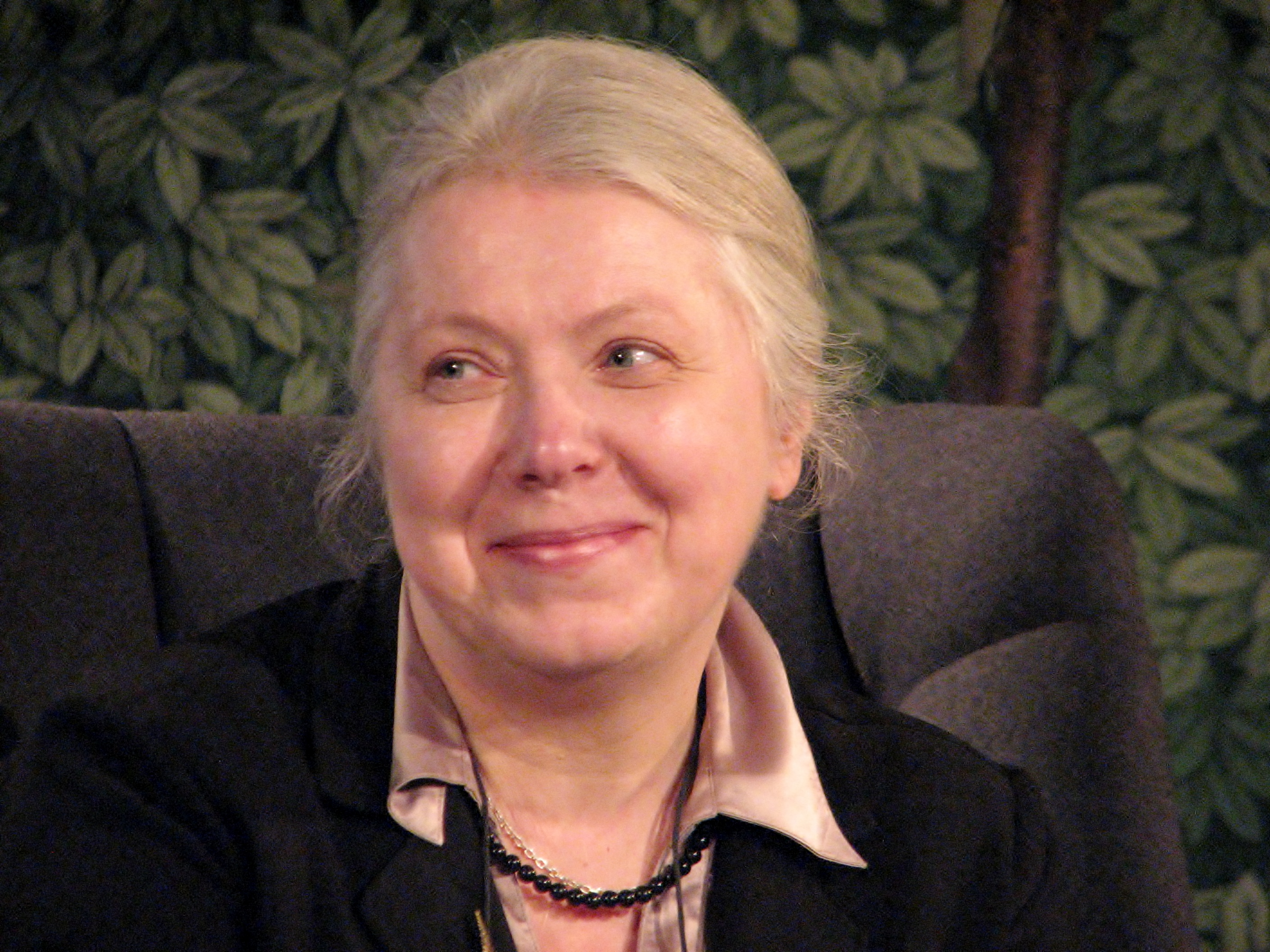
- Born: November 14, 1960 (age 65); Võru County, then part of Estonian SSR, Soviet Union
- Citizenship: Estonia
- Education: University of Tartu; Tallinn University
- Occupation: Folklorist

Marju Kõivupuu (born 14 November 1960) is an Estonian cultural activist and folklorist. Born into a Võro family, Kõivupuu has advocated for the preservation and cultivation of both Võro and Estonian culture. In recognition of this, she was named as Estonia's Citizen of the Year in 2013.

== Biography ==
Kõivupuu was born in the village of Mäepõru, Võru County, though her birth certificate stated she was born in Valga, due to it being the location of the nearest maternity hospital. Her mother was from Mõniste, while her father was of Latvian heritage. Kõivupuu's maternal family was ethnically Võro, and she grew up speaking both Estonian and Võro at home. Kõivupuu was educated in Valga and Tartu.

In 1986, Kõivupuu graduated from Tartu State University with a degree in philology. Between 1990 and 1993, she completed her postgraduate studies at the same university, before becoming a doctoral student at the Estonian Agricultural University, also in Tartu, between 1995 and 1999. In 2002, Kõivupuu defended her thesis at Tallinn University, supervised by Tarmo Kulmar, entitled Surmakultuuri muutumine ajas: ajaloolise Võrumaa matusekombestiku näitel (lit. 'Changing death culture over time: using the example of historic Võru County funeral customs').

Since 2017, Kõivupuu has been an associate professional at the University of Tallinn's Centre for Landscape and Culture, between 2007 and 2017, she was a senior researcher at the same institution. Between 2005 and 2007, Kõivupuu worked as an associate professor at the Viljandi Academy of Culture at the University of Tartu.

Kõivupuu has written for Estonian newspapers including Õhtuleht, Postimees and Maaleht. She has also produced shows on Estonian television and radio about Estonian language and culture, and is a regular guest on the Vikerraadio memory game show Mnemoturniir.

== Work ==
Kõivupuu has promoted the preservation of Estonian culture, and has also called for a greater cultural awareness among the Estonian public. She has stated that the Soviet occupation of Estonia led to a 50-year cultural interruption, impacting the way Estonian culture and traditions was passed on from generation to generation. Kõivupuu also believes there has been a shift in post-independence Estonia away from teaching about Estonian language and culture in schools, and has expressed concern that the prestige of Estonian culture is declining. She has called for Estonians to commemorate Estonian holidays, as well as its languages, including Estonian and Võro. In 2024, she published Aastaringi jutukera (lit. 'The Year-Round Storybook'), a children's book aimed at education about the history of Estonian culture and practices. Kõivupuu also wrote another book, Pärandiaabits lastele ja suurtele (lit. 'Heritage Guide for Children and Adults') to serve as a guide for families to Estonian festivals.

Kõivupuu's research interests include the relationship between humans and nature, Estonian cultural heritage, death culture and folk medicine. Her work and collections have served as a foundation for the cultural section of the Estonian National Museum. Her book on Estonian funerary customs, Inimese lahkumine (lit. 'The Departure of a Person'), considered how the funerals of significant Estonian figures such as Paul Keres served as a unifying force for the preservation of Estonian culture, particularly during its suppression in the Soviet era.

Kõivupuu served as the chairperson of the Estonian Heritage Board's Council for Sacred Natural Sites.

== Recognition and awards ==
- In 1995, the Cultural Foundation of the President of Estonia awarded Kõivupuu its Folklore Collection Prize for her work on collecting the folklore of Rõuge Parish and Hargla.
- In 1996, Kõivupuu received the Estonian Rebirth Prize in recognition of her work with the Võro Language and Culture Foundation.
- In 2013, Kõivupuu was named as Citizen of the year by the Ministry of Culture for her cultural preservation work, beating out 13 other candidates.
- In 2014, Kõivupuu received the Order of the White Star, fifth class. In 2019, she won the Eerik Kumari Award.
- On 29 September 2023, Kõivupuu was among four folklorists nominated by the Rector of Tallinn University to serve on the board of the Estonian Academy of Sciences for the field of ethnology, alongside Kristin Kuutma, Mare Kõiva and Art Leete.
- In 2025, she won the Estonian Folklore Annual Award in recognition of her career preserving Estonian culture and collecting regional folklore.
