= Aapo Ilves =

Estonian writer

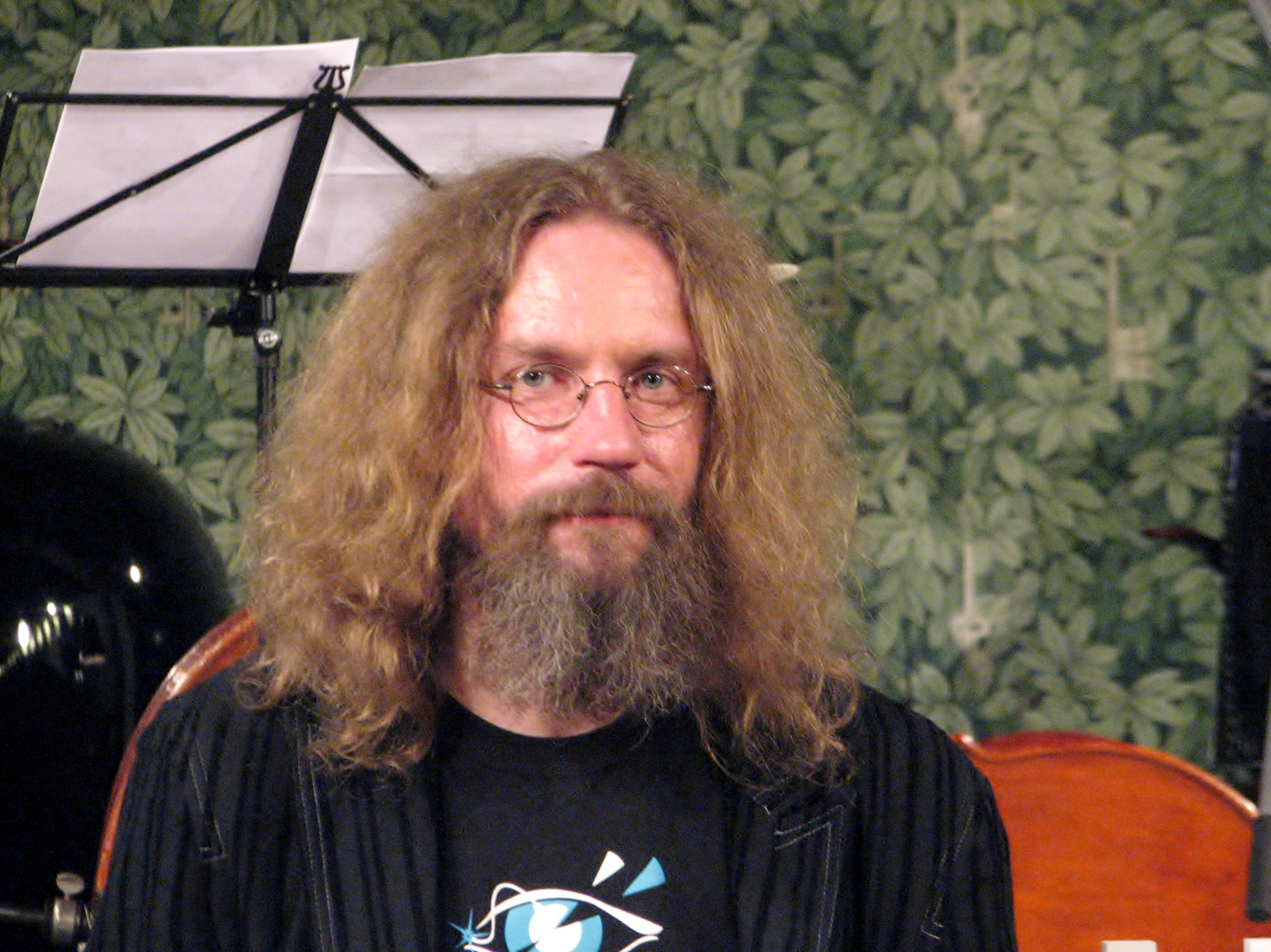
- Born: 20 October 1970 (age 55); Räpina, then part of Estonian SSR, Soviet Union
- Occupations: Poet, writer, playwright, artist and musician
- Years active: 1995–present

Aapo Ilves (Võro: Ilvese Aapo; born 20 October 1970, in Räpina) is an Estonian poet, writer, playwright, artist and musician. He writes in Estonian, Võro and Seto languages. Ilves has also written song lyrics for other artists, including several "Hits of the Year" and also Estonian Eurovision entries "Tii" in 2004 and Kuula in 2012.

He has published nine solo books, two solo CD's and many books and CD's with friends. Ilves has also written many plays, including several librettos for the Estonian National Opera. He has won the Estonian National Broadcast's radio contest "Battle of Poetry".

Ilves is a member of Estonian Writers' Union, Estonian Authors' Society (Estonian: Eesti Autorite Ühing) and formerly Young Authors' Association in Tartu (1996–2009).

He has contributed his writings and drawings to many journals and newspapers including children's journal Täheke and the only Võro language newspaper Uma Leht.
