= Võru County =

County of Estonia

Coordinates: 57°45′N 26°55′E

Võru County Võrumaa (Estonian) Võro maakund (Võro)
- County
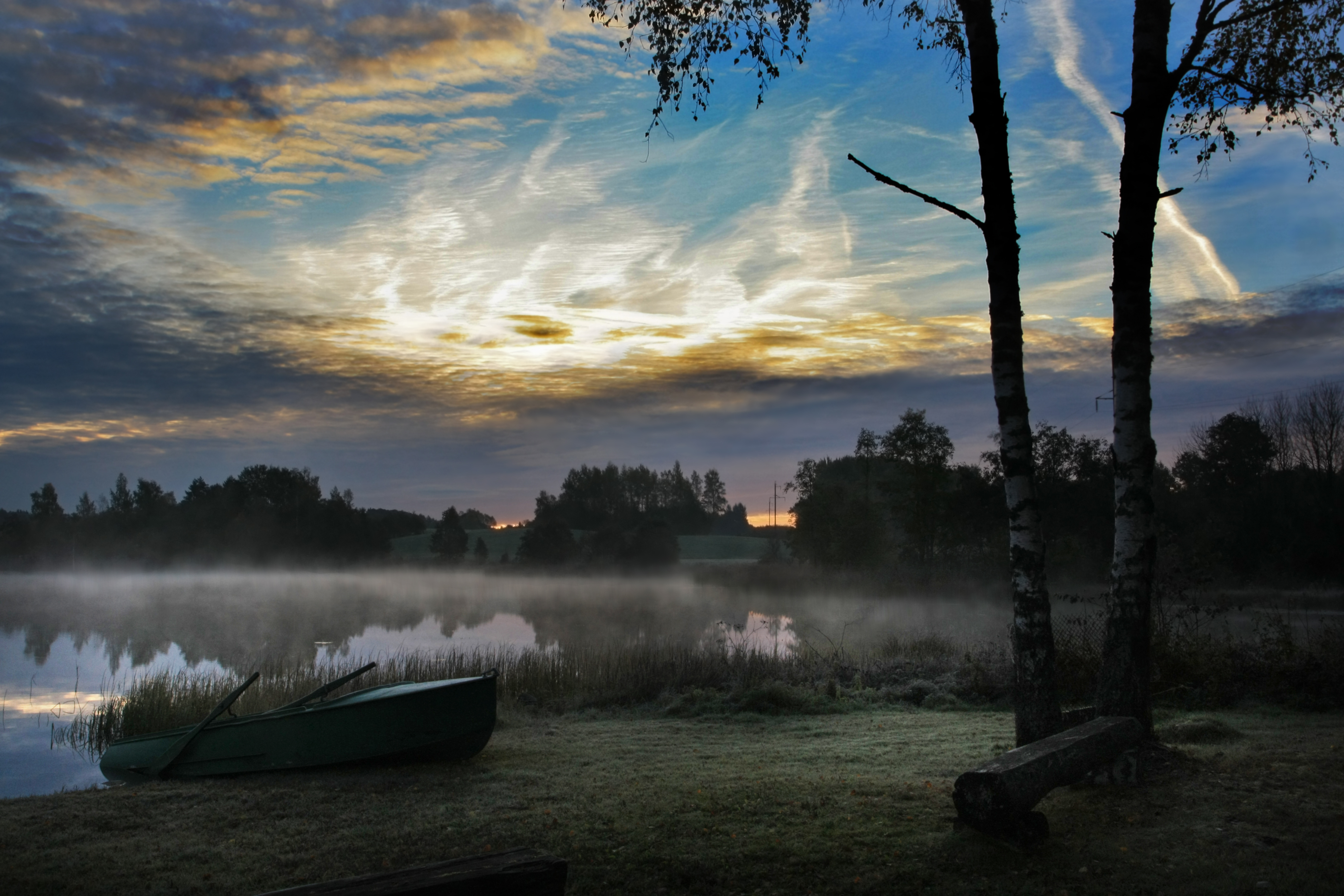

- Flag Coat of arms

- Country: Estonia
- Capital: Võru

Area
  - Total: 2,305.44 km^{2} (890.14 sq mi)

Population (2022)
  - Total: 34,182
  - Rank: 8th
  - Density: 14.827/km^{2} (38.401/sq mi)

GDP
  - Total: €584 million (2022)
  - Per capita: €17,041 (2022)
- ISO 3166 code: EE-87
- Vehicle registration: V

Võru County (Estonian: Võru maakond or Võrumaa; Võro: Võro maakund) is a county in southern Estonia. It is bordered by Valga and Põlva counties, Latvia's Alūksne and Ape municipalities, and Russia's Pskov Oblast (making it the only Estonian county to border two countries).

The territory of Võrumaa covers 2,305 km^{2} (890 sq mi) and is influenced by a temperate seasonal climate. In 2022, Võru County had a population of 34,182, 2.6% of the total population in Estonia. The county is subdivided into 12 rural municipalities and one urban municipality, the county capital, Võru.

== Ethnic division and culture ==
In Võru County, there are 95.3% Estonians, 3.3% Russians, and 1.4% other nationalities. Two indigenous ethnic groups live in Võru County – the Võro people and the Setos. Both ethnic groups have their own language (Võro, Seto) and cultural heritage in traditions.

=== Võro people ===
The Võro Institute is established for the preservation and promotion of the Võro language and culture, which are tightly connected with its historic centre, the rural and mostly agricultural South-Eastern Estonian county of Võromaa.

The Võro Institute was founded by the Estonian government in 1995. The institute is engaged in a wide range of activities, including establishing school programs, conducting linguistic and regional research, preserving place-names and their corresponding stories, publishing Võro-language scholarship and school textbooks, and organizing annual language conferences etc. The aim of these activities is to encourage the Võro people to speak their own language and to preserve their characteristic life-style.

In 2014, the smoke sauna tradition of Võro people was added to the UNESCO list of intangible cultural heritage. Smoke saunas along with sauna rituals are a part of traditional life and cultural heritage of the Võro people. A smoke sauna is an old-fashioned rural sauna, which has no chimney.

=== Setos ===
The purpose of the Seto Institute is to coordinate and promote research in the field of the Seto region and the Seto culture and to introduce the results of the research to the public. The Seto Institute publishes papers, organizes events and organizes education in the field of Seto culture in cooperation with other organizations in the Seto region. In 2009, the Setos’ polyphonic style of folk singing, called leelo, was added to the UNESCO list of intangible cultural heritage. Believed to be at least 1,000 years old, leelo is considered a special local variant of the Baltic-Finnic runo song tradition.

== Religion ==
The Lutheran congregations in the county are under the Võru Deanery of the South Estonian Diocese of the Estonian Evangelical Lutheran Church: in Võru, Pindi, Roosa, Rõuge, Urvaste and Vastseliina.

Eastern Orthodox congregations in the county are under the jurisdiction of the Estonian Apostolic Orthodox Church.

Several congregations of Baptists, and other Christian churches operate in the county.

Religious affiliations in Võru County census 2000–2021*
Religion	2001		2011		2021	
Religion	Number	%	Number	%	Number	%
Christianity	10,418	32.7	7,983	28.0	7,500	25.6
—Orthodox Christians	2,030	6.4	1,839	6.4	2,320	7.9
—Lutherans	8,118	24.5	5,846	20.5	4,500	15.4
—Catholics	40	0.1	25	0.09	220	0.7
—Baptists	75	0.2	72	02.	130	0.4
—Jehovah's Witnesses	95	0.3	105	0.5	120	0.4
—Pentecostals	27	0.09	11	0.03	-	-
—Old Believers	-	-	1	0.003	-	-
—Methodists	29	0.09	36	0.1	30	0.1
—Adventists	4	0.01	3	0.01	30	0.1
—Other Christians	-	-	45	0.1	150	0.5
Islam	6	0.01	11	0.04	-	
Other religions**	124	0.4	180	0.6	430	1.5
No religion	10,958	34.4	16,460	57.8	16,930	57.9
Not stated***	10,338	32.4	3,900	13.7	4,320	14.8
Total population*	31,883	28,484		29,220		
*The censuses of Estonia count the religious affiliations of the population older than 15 years of age.

== Economy ==
The county's main economic sectors are forestry and wood processing, furniture and food industry and also tourism. According to statistics of 2011, there are 1852 SMEs in Võru County. 47% of enterprises in the county belong to primary sector (agriculture, forestry), 38% of enterprises work in tertiary sector (trade, services) and 15% of enterprises are involved in secondary sector (processing industry). The biggest foreign owned companies based in Võru County are AS Toftan (wood processing), AS Barrus (wood processing), AS Antsla Inno (furniture production), AS Rauameister (metal processing), AS Võru Juust (food processing) and Danpower GmbH (energy production).

The county enjoys an advantageous location due to its relative proximity to Pskov in Russia (100 km) and Riga in Latvia (220 km). Accessibility is provided by several transport corridors running through the county. One of the most important transit routes in Estonia, Tallinn-Tartu-Pskov, passes the county. The South-East corner of the county is crossed by the Riga-Pskov-St Petersburg major road. The county is strategically placed on trade routes between the East and West.

== Education ==
The county has 23 schools with approximately 1500 pupils. One vocational school, Võru County Vocational Training Center, offers 33 different practical curriculums in various levels for 600 students.

== Culture and events ==
Võrumaa is a distinctive region bearing the culture of Võro and Seto.

Smaller sub-areas are tightly covered with community centres, libraries, museums and sport centres. Larger cultural and sport facilities are Võru Culture Center Kannel, Võrumaa Central library, Võro Institute, the Vana-Võromaa Culture House and the Võrumaa Sport Centre.

There are many traditional and non-traditional cultural and sport events taking place in the county, which are organized by different associations and non-profit organizations. The cultural landscape is shaped by events such as Võru Folk Festival, song festival Uma Pido, Ostrova Festival of traditional Seto and modern pop music, food fair UMA MEKK, unique Lindora fair, Võhandu International Canoeing Marathon, Haanja Ski Marathon, Rõuge Boat Race, and many more.

== History ==
Võru County was established in 1784. Võrumaa in its historical borders (Võro: Vana Võromaa) included eight parishes: Karula, Hargla, Urvaste, Rõuge, Kanepi, Põlva, Räpina and Vastseliina. These parishes are currently centered (due to redistricting) in Võru and Põlva Counties with parts extending into Valga and Tartu Counties.

In April 1917, Võru County, which had previously been part of Livonia Governorate, was merged with the autonomous Estonian Governorate. In 1920, when the northern areas of Valga County inhabited by Estonians were included in Estonia and the new Valga County was formed in the Estonian territories, part of the Karula and Hargla parishes was merged with Valga County. In 1925, part of the Räpina parish was transferred to Tartu County. In 1944, Petseri County was abolished and its part that remained in the Estonian SSR was merged with Võru County. In 1950, counties were abolished and the Võru, Räpina, Põlva, Antsla and Vastseliina districts were formed in the area of former Võru County.

From 1944 to 1953, the Estonian Forest Brothers (anti-Soviet partisans) were most active in Võru County.

Võru District received its final borders during the administrative reform of the 1960s. On 1 January 1990, Võru County was formed within the borders of Võru District.

The county's borders were last changed as a result of the 2017 administrative reform. In 2017, the number of municipalities within the county also decreased due to their merger.

== County government ==
Until 2017 the Võru County Government (maavalitsus) was a regional government agency, directed by the County Governor (maavanem), who represented the national interests in the county and was responsible for the balanced and comprehensive development of the county. The County Governor was appointed to the office by the Government of Estonia for a 5-year term, on the proposal of the Minister of Regional Affairs. Since 2010 to 2017 the Governor was Andres Kõiv.

== Municipalities ==
Today Võru County consists of 5 municipalities that work together to facilitate the county's balanced and sustainable development. 5 municipalities are divided for one urban - Võru - and 4 rural municipalities (vallad - parishes) - Antsla, Rõuge, Setomaa, Võru. In Võru County there are two towns (linnad - Võru and Antsla), small boroughs and approximately 570 villages.

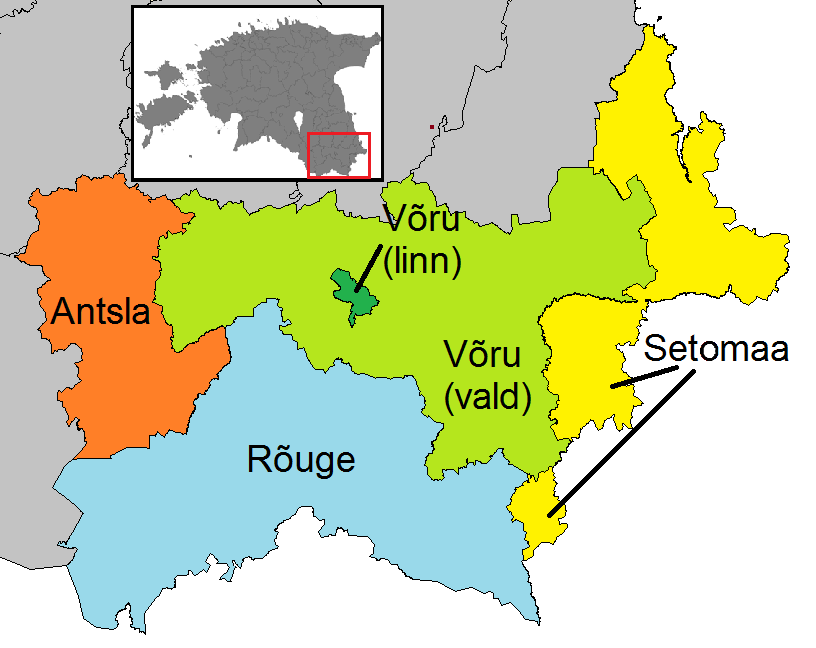
Municipalities of Võru county after the 2017 reform.

Rank	Municipality	Type	Population (2018)	Area km^{2}	Density
1	Antsla Parish	Rural	4,606	410	11.2
2	Rõuge Parish	Rural	5,551	934	5.9
3	Setomaa Parish	Rural	3,556	461	7.7
4	Võru Parish	Rural	10,942	954	11.5
5	Võru	Urban	12,242	14	874.4

== Gallery ==
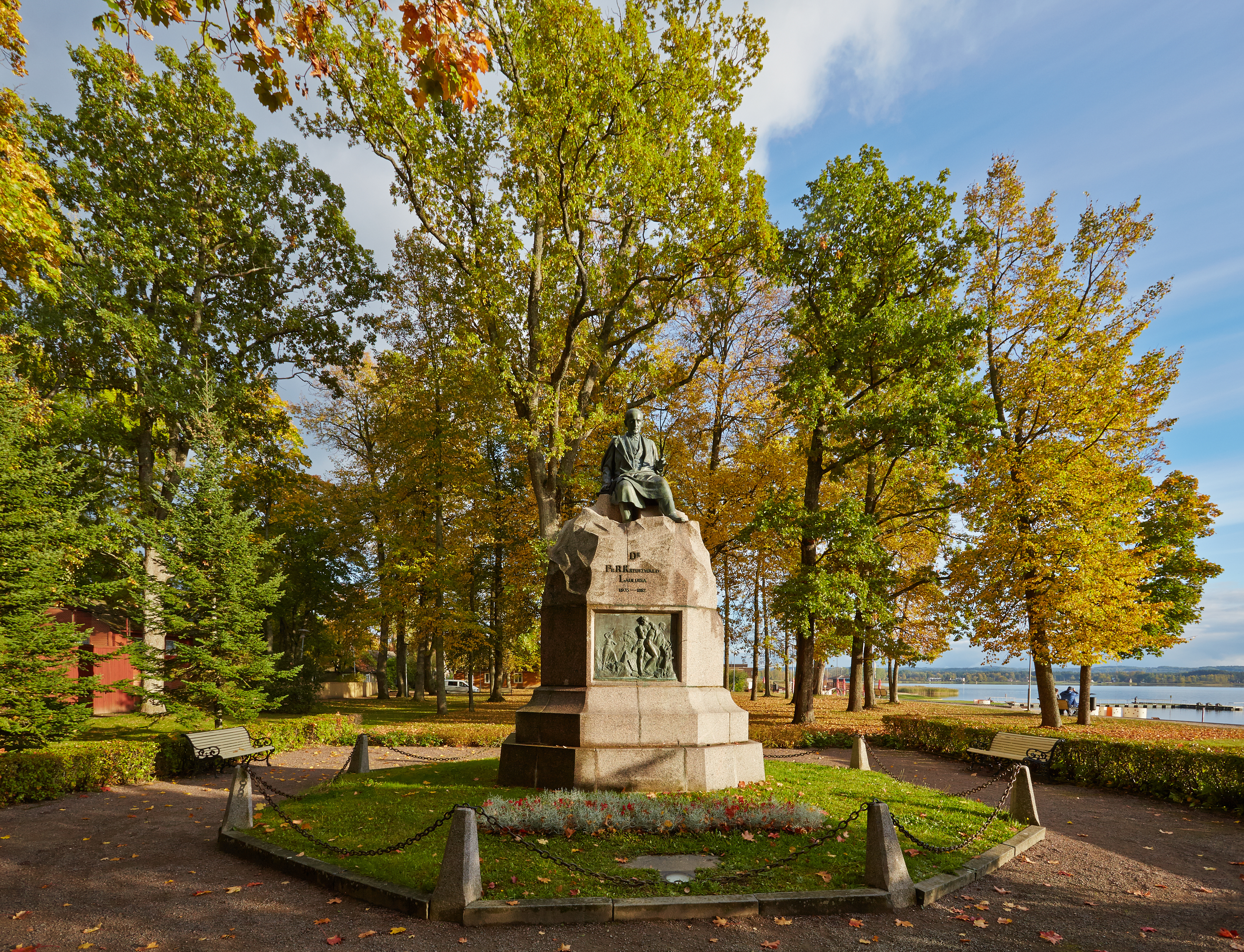
Monument to writer Friedrich Reinhold Kreutzwald in Võru

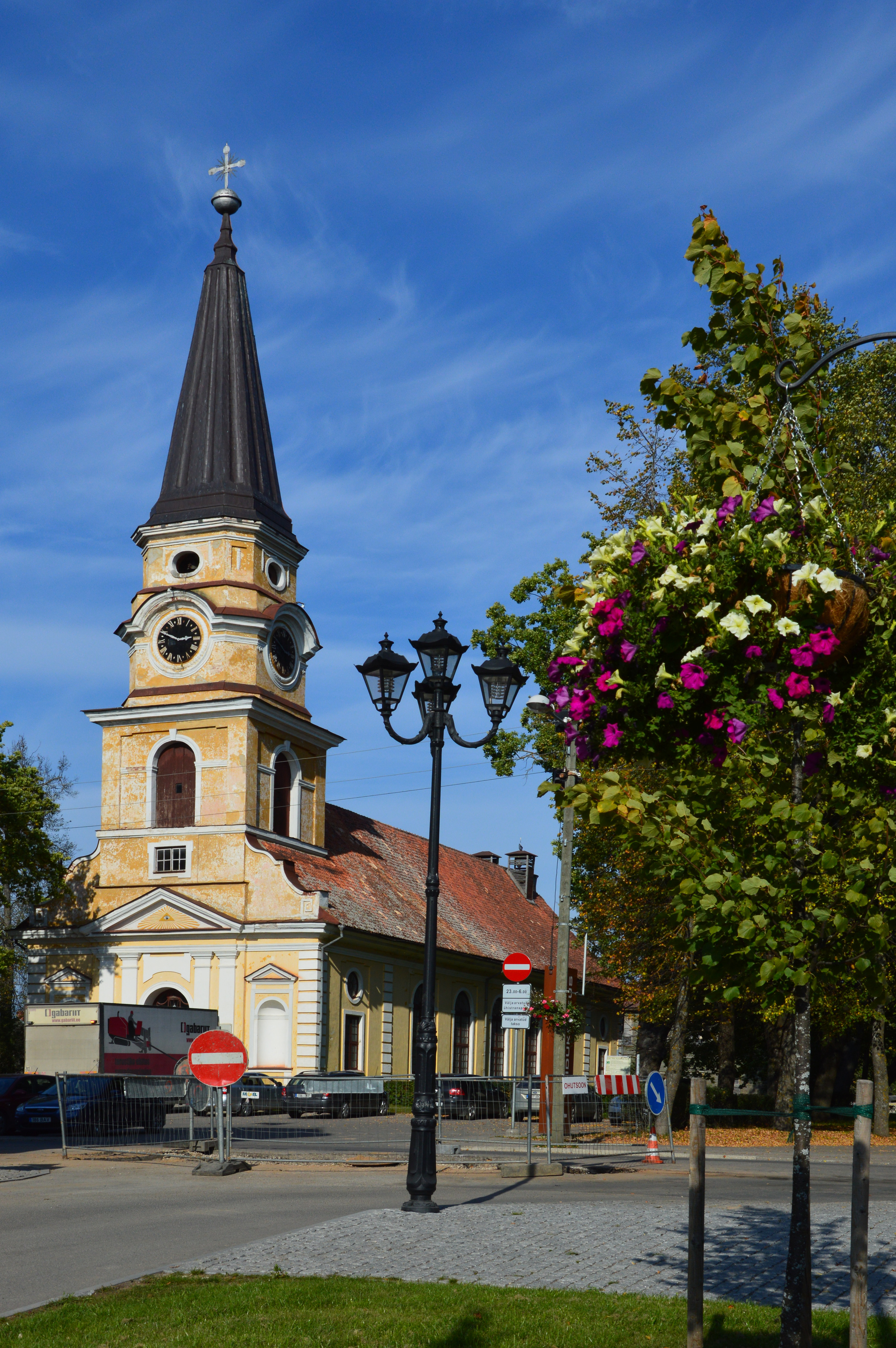
St. Catherine's church in Võru

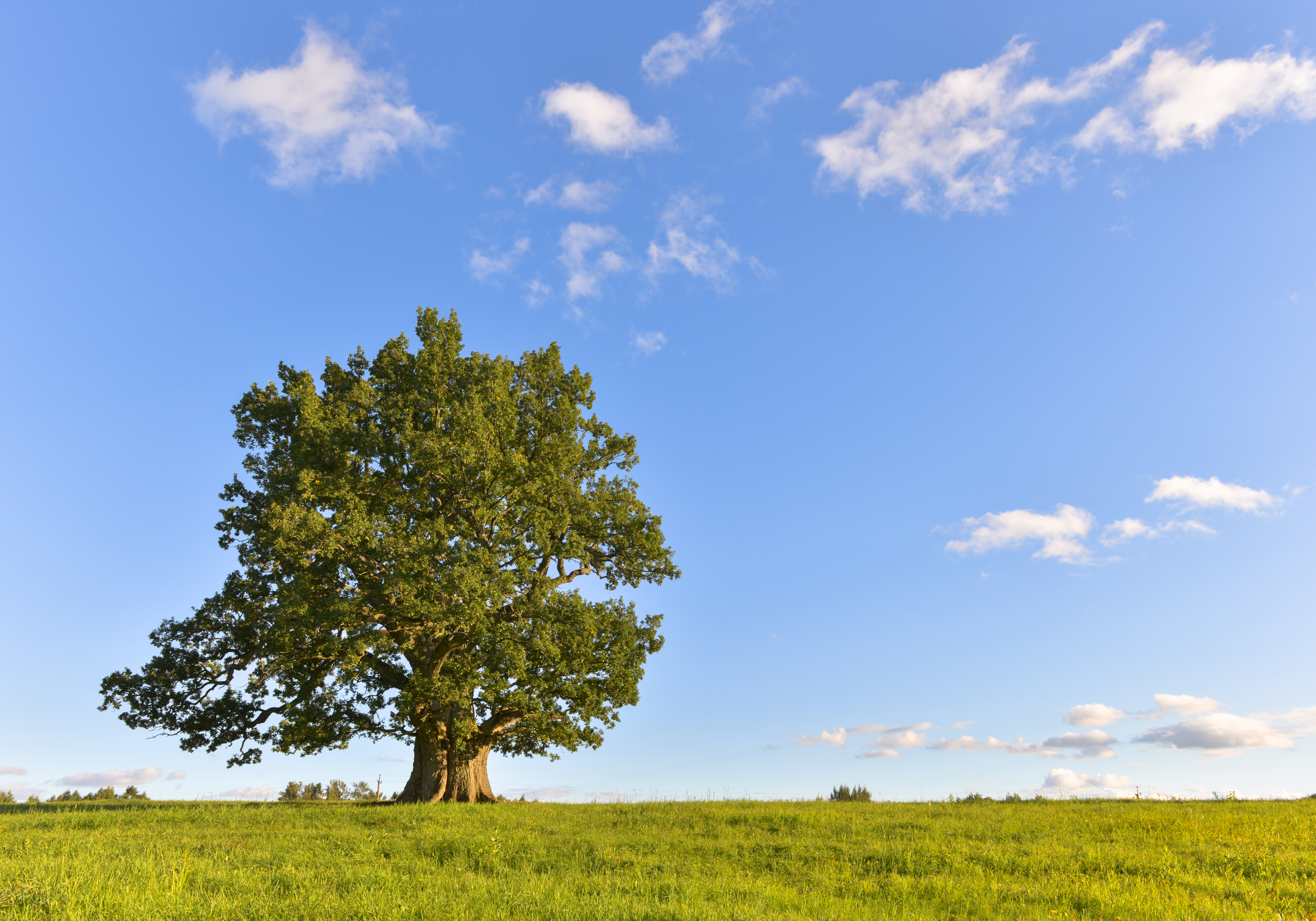
Tamme-Lauri oak in Antsla Parish

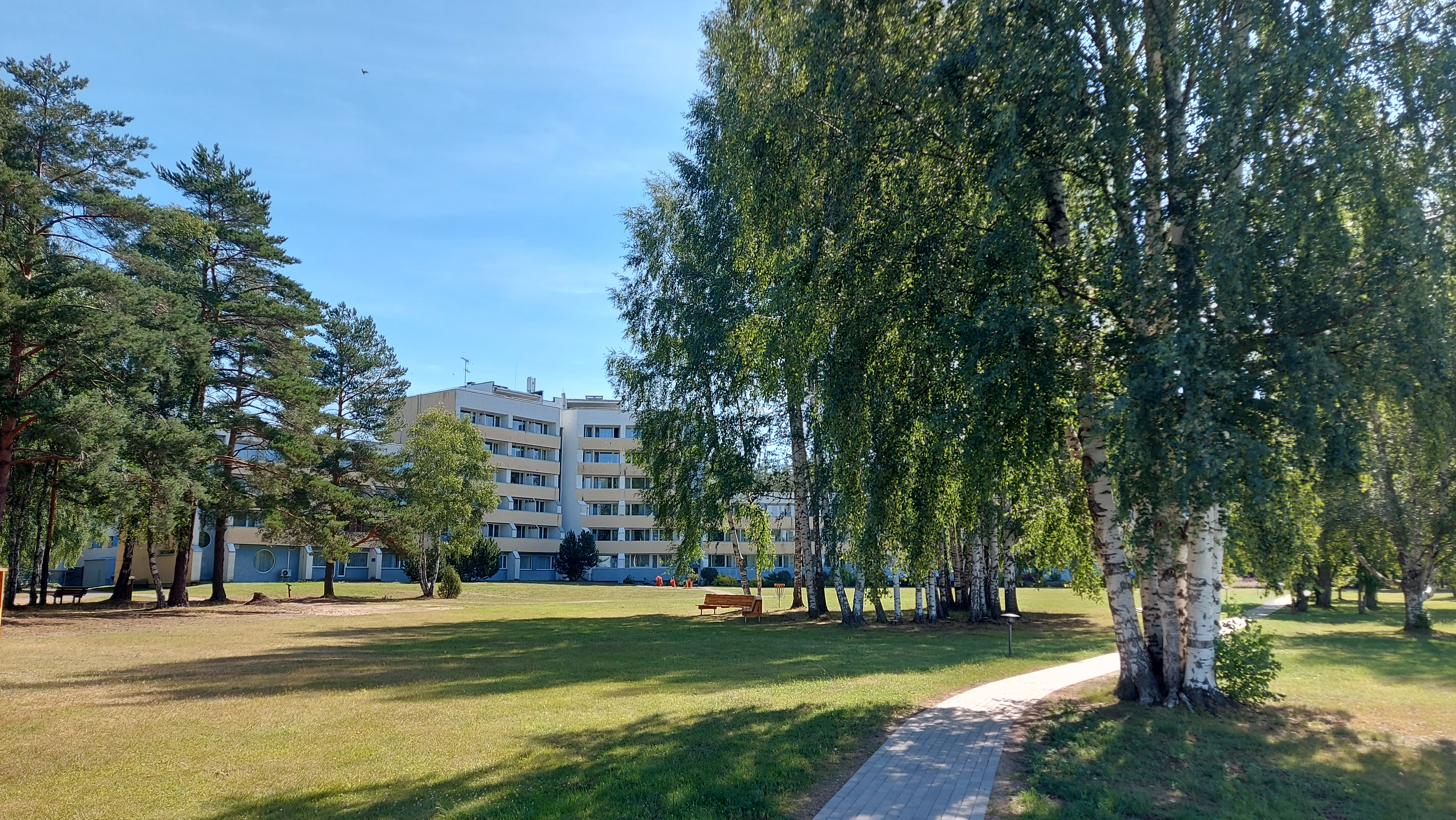
Värska sanatorium in Setomaa Parish

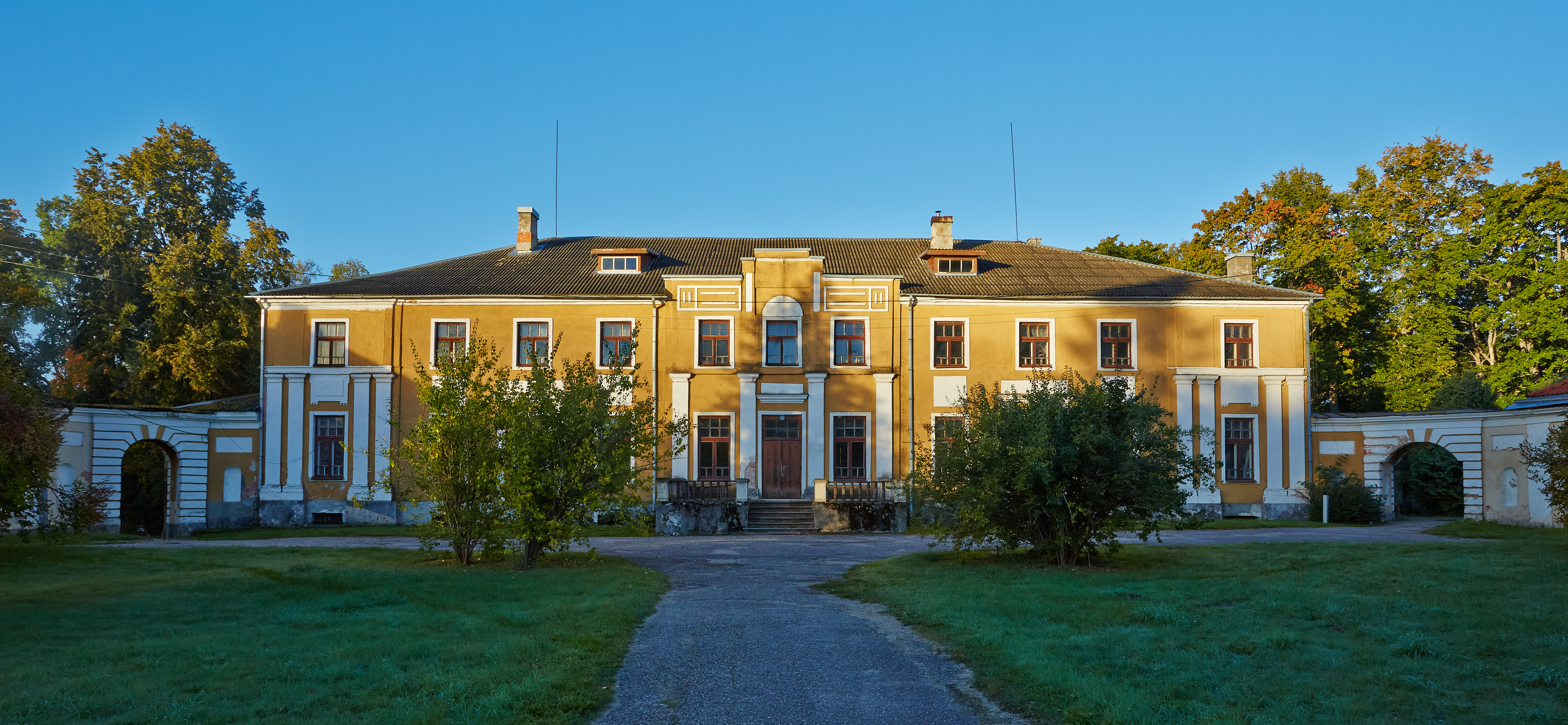
Väimela manor

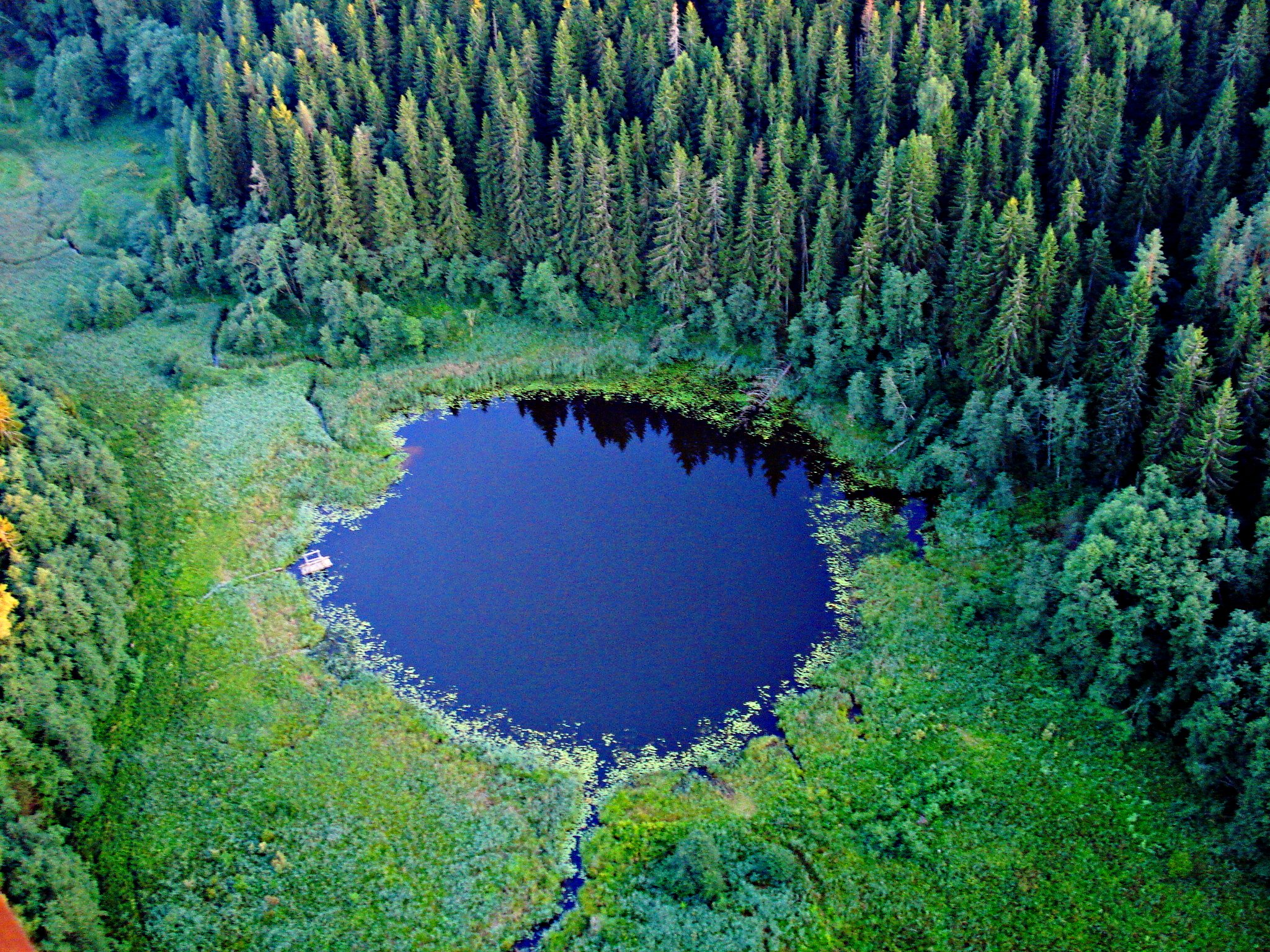
Väike Kõrbjärv lake in Haanja Parish

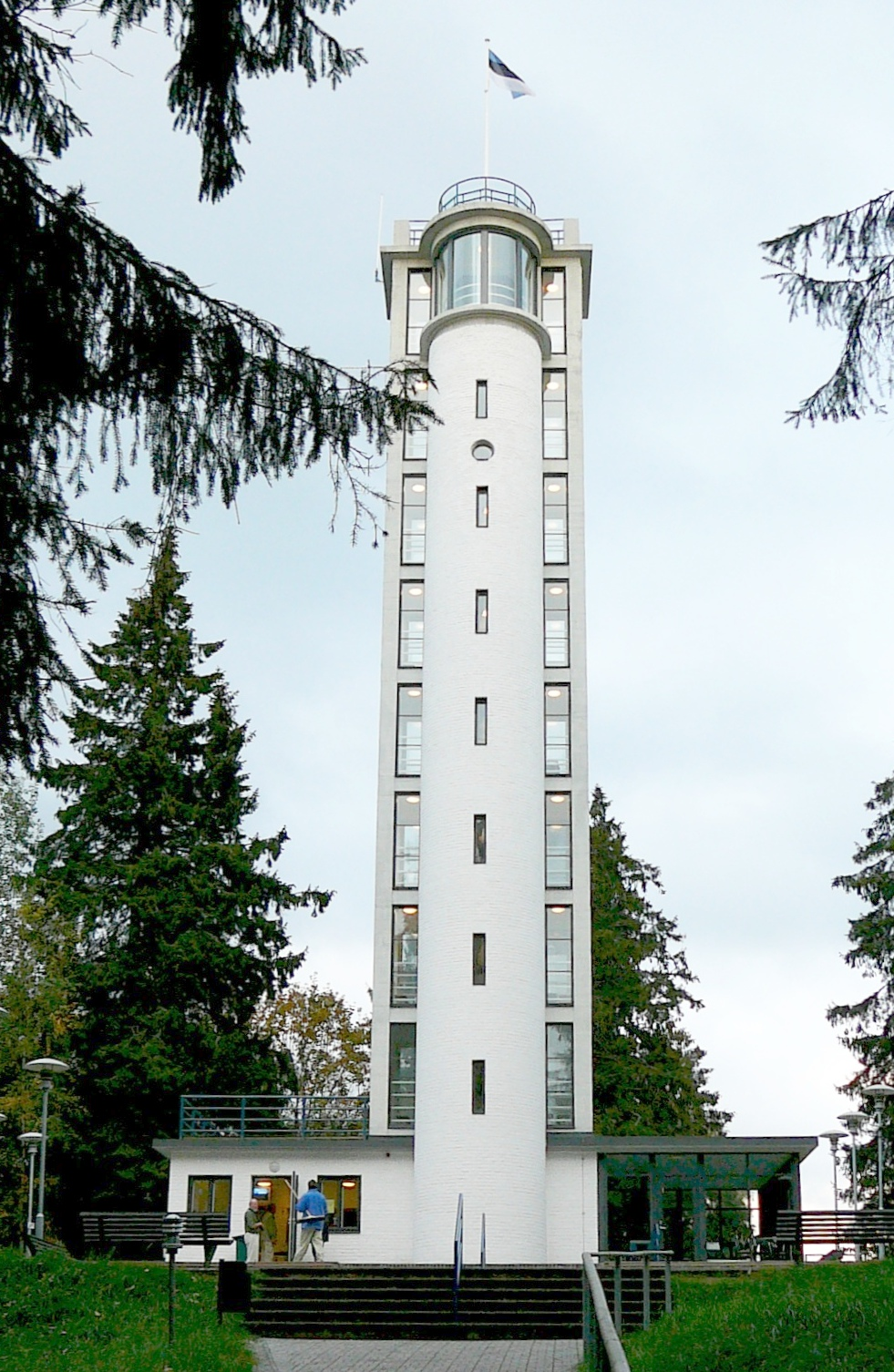
Suur Munamägi observation tower

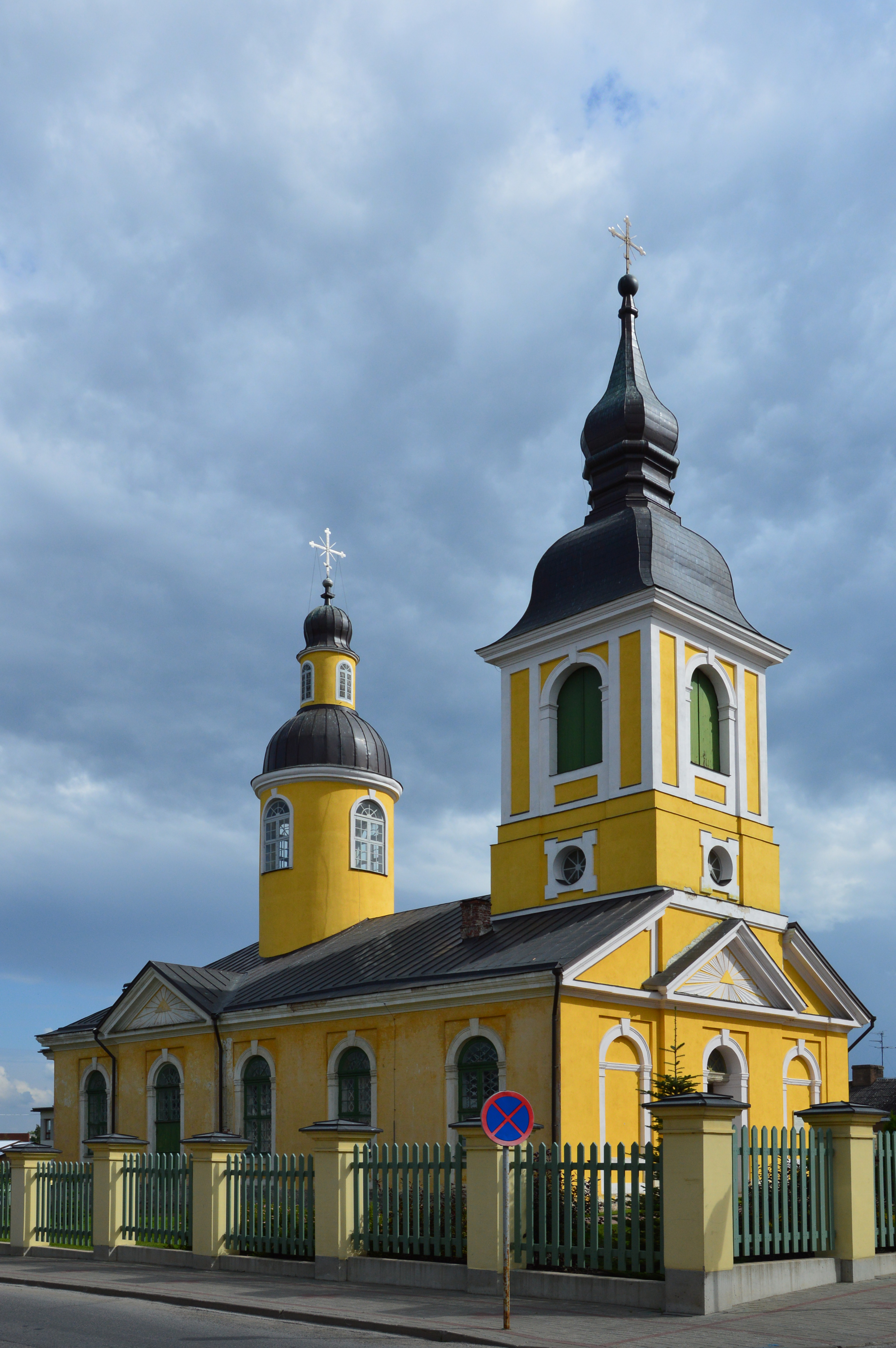
St. Catherine's orthodox church in Võru

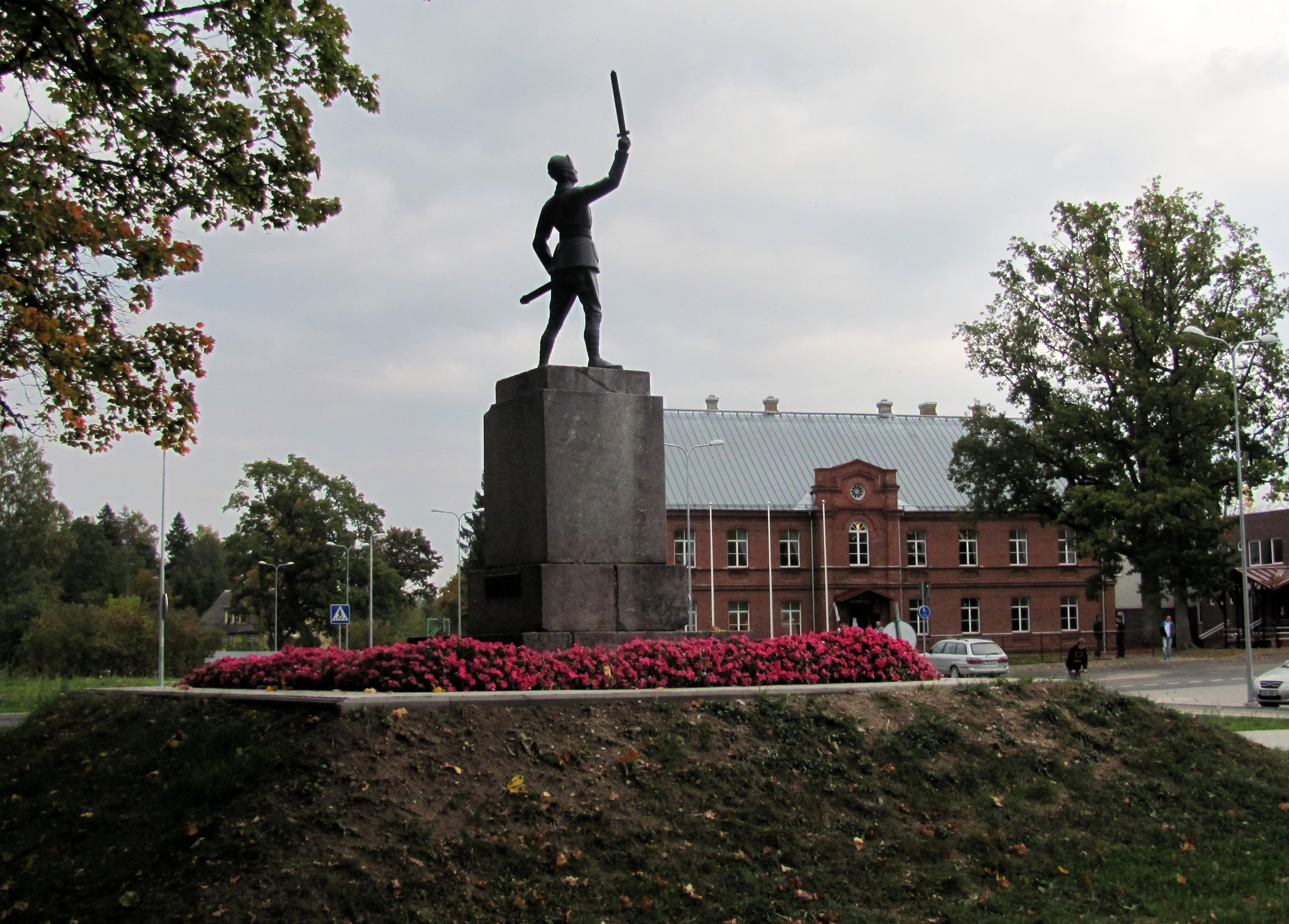
Monument to the Estonian War of Independence in Rõuge

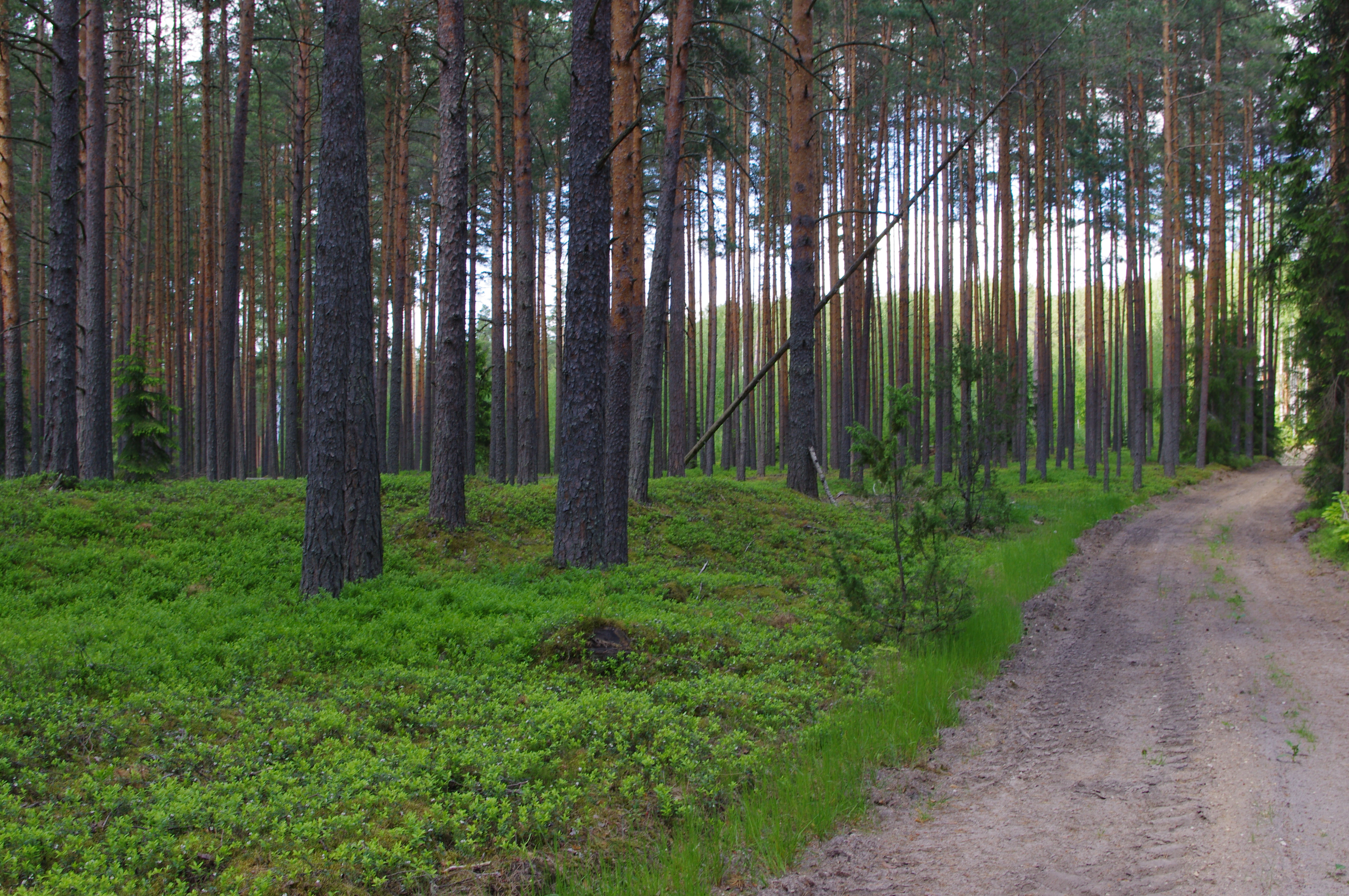
Forested area standing on burial mounds near Puutli

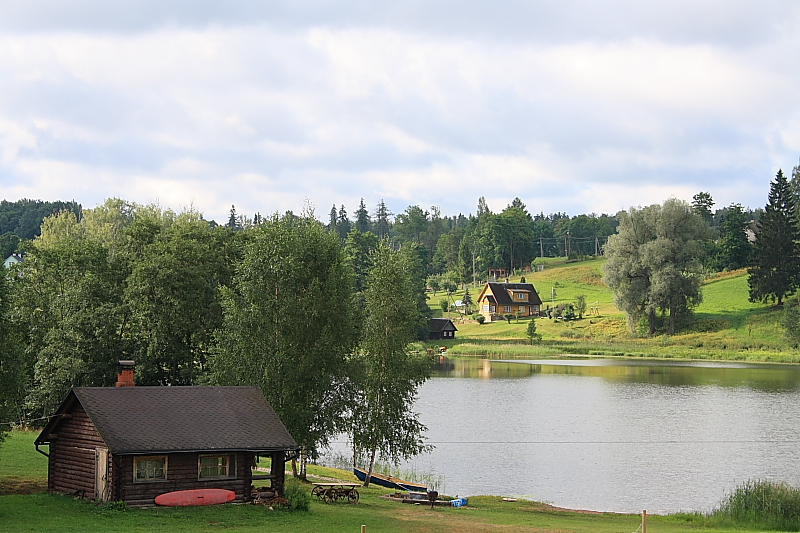
Countryside near Rõuge on Ratasjärv lake

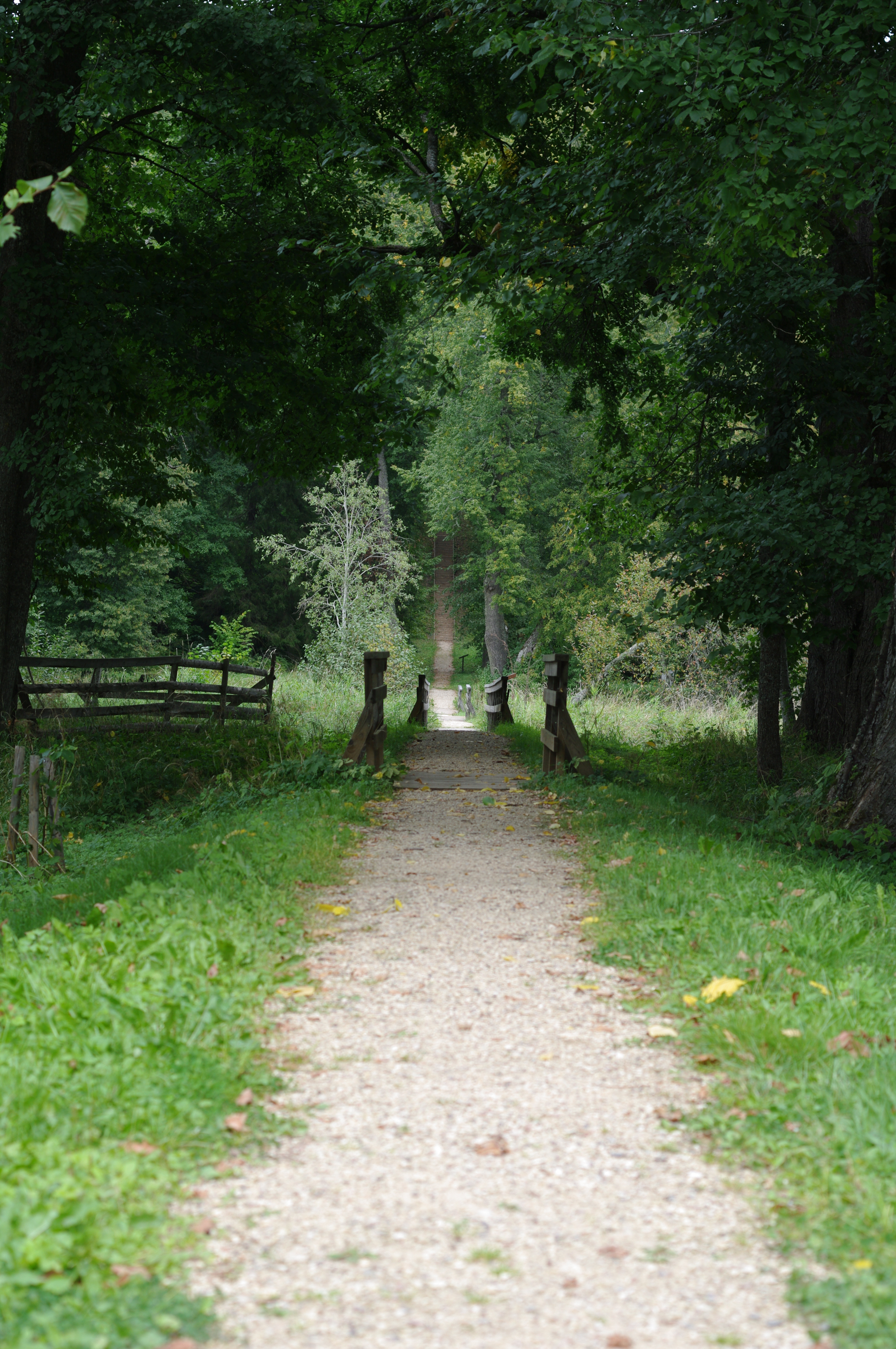
A wooded trail through Sänna Park

== Notable people ==
- Gottlieb Ast (1874–1919), politician from Orava, Mayor of Tallinn in 1919.
- Aadu Lüüs (1878–1967), paediatrician and medical scientist from Vana-Antsla
- Karl Pärsimägi (1902–1942), a fauvist painter from Oe.
- August Sabbe (1909–1978), from Paidra, one of the last members of the Forest Brothers
- Valev Uibopuu (1913–1997), a writer from Vana-Antsla
- Ferdinand Eisen (1914–2000), educator, pedagogy researcher from Rõuge Parish and Minister of Education 1960 to 1980
- Ülo Tulik (1957–2022), agronomist and politician from Meremäe, Mayor of Võru, 2010 to 2011
- Georg Pelisaar (born 1958), journalist and politician from Selise; elected mayor of Põlva in 2011.
- Marju Kõivupuu (born 1960), cultural activist and folklorist from Mäepõru
- Ivari Padar (born 1965), politician from Navi, Minister of Finance, 2007 to 2009
- Rein Järvelill (born 1966), politician from Uusvada, Mayor of Värska, 2012 to 2017.

=== Sport ===
- Eduard Pütsep (1898–1960), Greco-Roman wrestler, gold medaliist in the 1924 Summer Olympics
- Aavo Pikkuus (born 1954), cyclist from Kapera, team gold medallist in the 100 km team time trial at the 1976 Summer Olympics
- Kaarel Kiidron (born 1990), footballer from Urvaste who played about 220 games and 1 for Estonia
- Jaan Roose (born 1992), slackliner, raised in Matsuri
