= Lüllemäe =

Village in Estonia

- Village
- Location in Estonia
- Coordinates: 57°45′05″N 26°22′30″E
- Country: Estonia
- County: Valga County
- Municipality: Valga Parish

Population (01.01.2004)
  - Total: 290

Drone video of Lüllemäe in Estonia 2021

Lüllemäe is a village in Valga Parish, Valga County, in southern Estonia. Prior to the 2017 reform of Estonian municipalities, it was the administrative centre of Karula Parish. Lüllemäe has a population of 202 (as of 1 January 2004).

Lüllemäe is home to Karula St. Mary's Church. The church was first mentioned in 1392, but it is believed to have been built in 1318. Meanwhile, it has been demolished several times, last in the World War II in 1944. The latest new church was built in 1997. There are also four historical cemeteries in Lüllemäe.
