= Võros =

Ethnic group in Estonia

Võros võrokõsõq võrukesed
- Võro flag

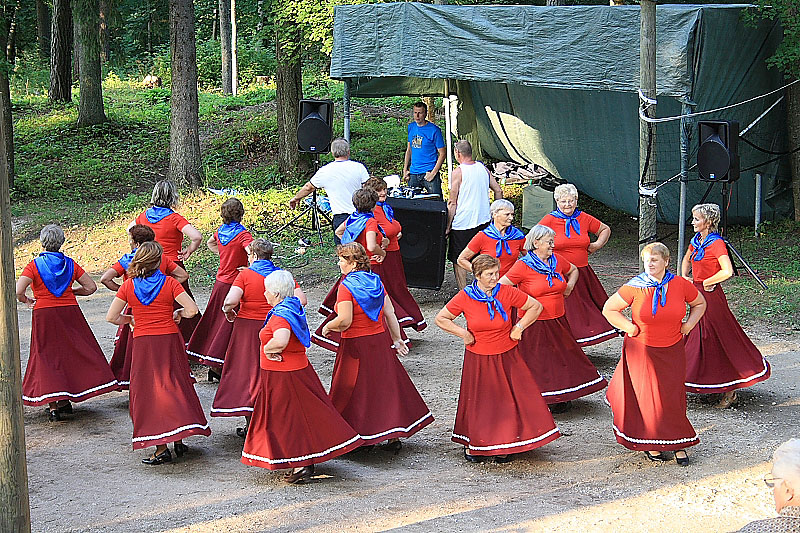
- Traditional Võro dance

Total population
- c. 72,000 (2021 Estonian census recorded 97,320 speakers of the Võru group of dialects, of whom 25,080 spoke the Seto sub-variety)

Regions with significant populations
- Estonia (historical Vana-Võromaa; substantial diaspora in Tartu and Tallinn)

Languages
- Võro, Standard Estonian

Religion
- Historically Evangelical Lutheran

Related ethnic groups
- Estonians · Setos · other Finnic peoples

Pulga, a native Võro speaker.

Võros (Võro: võrokõsõq, pronounced [vɤrokɤsəʔ], Estonian: võrukesed, Finnish: võrolaiset) are a Finnic ethnographic group of Estonia, native to the Võro-speaking area of historical Vana-Võromaa in the southeast of the country. With the related Setos, they descend from speakers of South Estonian, a divergent branch of the Finnic languages. On 22 April 2023, the inaugural Congress of the Võro People (Võrokõisi kongress) declared the Võros an indigenous people of Estonia and called on the Estonian state to formally recognise that status. However, the government of Estonia does not recognize them as a distinct ethnic group.

== Names ==
The endonym võrokõsõq and the Standard Estonian exonym võrukesed derive from the toponym Võro/Võru, after the historical Võru District (German: Werrosche Kreis), established in 1783 under the administrative reforms of Catherine II. The district was named for the town of Võru, founded by imperial decree on 21 August 1784.

== History ==
=== Linguistic prehistory ===
South Estonian, ancestral to Võro, diverged from the rest of the Finnic family between roughly 1000 and 600 BC, making it among the earliest branches of Finnic to separate from the common protolanguage. From the 13th to the 16th century the Võro-speaking area formed part of the Episcopacy of Tartu, with Low German and later High German used by ruling elites.

=== Early South Estonian literacy ===
A distinct South Estonian literary tradition emerged in the 17th century. Early printed works in the language include the Catholic prayer book Agenda Parva (1622), a translation of the New Testament (Wastne Testament, 1686), and the first Estonian-language newspaper, Tarto maa rahwa Näddali-Leht (1806).

=== Administrative reorganisation ===
The Russian Empire established Võru District (Werrosche Kreis) in 1783 from eight historically Võro-speaking parishes (Karula, Hargla, Urvaste, Rõuge, Kanepi, Põlva, Räpina and Vastseliina) that remained the principal administrative unit of the region until 1920. Under interwar Estonian rule, parts of Karula and Hargla parishes were transferred to the newly formed Valga County in 1920, parts of Räpina parish to Tartu County in 1925, and Põlva rayon was carved out under Soviet administrative reform in 1960.

=== Decline and revitalisation ===
South Estonian literary use declined in the late 19th century as standardised North Estonian became the basis of national literary Estonian; primary instruction in South Estonian ceased in the 1890s. A shift toward Standard Estonian intensified between the 1960s and the 1980s, driven by urbanisation, mass schooling and negative attitudes toward local speech. During the Soviet period, systematic documentation of the dialect continued at the Estonian SSR Academy of Sciences' Institute of Language and Literature in Tallinn, where Paul Ariste founded the journal Sovetskoye finno-ugrovedenie in 1965 and dialectologists including Mari Must and Hella Keem assembled the corpus and text editions on which subsequent Võro scholarship rests.

The Võro revitalisation movement emerged in the late 1980s alongside Estonia's second national awakening. The annual Kaika Summer University (Kaika Suvõülikuul) began in 1988, the state-funded Võro Institute (Võro Instituut) was established in 1995, and the regional song festival Uma Pido has been held in Võru every two to three years since 2008.

== Population and geography ==
Historical Vana-Võromaa covers approximately 4,200 km² across present-day Võru and Põlva counties together with parts of Valga and Tartu counties; its current population is around 57,000.

The 2021 Estonian census recorded 97,320 residents speaking a dialect of the Võru group, of whom 25,080 spoke the Seto sub-variety, leaving roughly 72,240 speakers of Võro proper. Within the historical region, the dialect was reported by 73 per cent of Võru County residents and 59 per cent of Põlva County residents. An estimated 60 per cent of Võro speakers live outside Vana-Võromaa, chiefly in Tartu and Tallinn. Census language figures combine active speakers, passive bilinguals and respondents whose declaration reflects ethnic affiliation rather than fluency.

== Language ==
Võro (Võro kiil) is one of the two surviving South Estonian varieties, together with Seto. The 21st edition of Ethnologue classifies it as "threatened", and the UNESCO Atlas of the World's Languages in Danger as definitely endangered.

Distinguishing features include vowel harmony (lost in North Estonian), a glottal stop in the nominative plural, a different third-person singular indicative form, and a post-verbal negative particle. Approximately 19,000 South Estonian words are not used in North Estonian, and the shared core vocabulary between Võro and Standard Estonian has been estimated at around one fifth. Modern standardisation produced a Võro–Estonian dictionary in 2002 (15,000 entries) and an Estonian–Võro dictionary in 2014 (20,000 entries), both compiled at the Võro Institute.

The Estonian Language Act treats Võro as a "regional form" of Estonian rather than granting it official status as a separate regional language, and the Population Register does not permit residents to register Võro as their mother tongue. The Congress of the Võro People has called for these provisions to be amended.

== Religion ==
The Võro population, like the rest of historically south-eastern Livonia, was predominantly Lutheran, in contrast to the Eastern Orthodox tradition of their eastern neighbours the Setos.

== Culture ==
The smoke sauna tradition of Vana-Võromaa (savvusann), comprising bathing customs, the making of bath whisks, the construction and repair of saunas and the smoking of meat, was inscribed on the UNESCO Representative List of the Intangible Cultural Heritage of Humanity in 2014.

The fortnightly newspaper Uma Leht has been published in Võro since 2000 and is distributed without charge in Võru and Põlva counties; a 2018 readership survey found that around 26,500 residents aged 15 and over read either its print or online editions. The children's monthly magazine Täheke has published an annual Võro-language issue since 2005. Estonian Public Broadcasting has aired a weekly five-minute Võro news bulletin since 2005, alongside Võro-language television documentaries and drama series between 2005 and 2017.

== Indigenous status ==
On 22 April 2023, 126 elected delegates from the eight historical parishes of Vana-Võromaa convened the inaugural Congress of the Võro People in Võru. The Congress adopted, by 122 votes in favour to one against with three abstentions, a declaration designating the Võros an indigenous people of Estonia, citing the United Nations Declaration on the Rights of Indigenous Peoples (2007), ILO Convention 169 (1989) and a 2018 European Parliament resolution on indigenous rights. The Congress also elected an eleven-member Council of Elders to represent the Võros in subsequent negotiations with the Estonian state, and adopted a parallel resolution calling on the state and Vana-Võromaa municipalities to recognise Võro as an indigenous regional language and to provide bilingual schooling, media and public signage.

== See also ==
- Võru County (Võrumaa, Võromaa)
- Võro language
- Võro Institute
- Setos
- Uma Leht
- Smoke sauna tradition
- South Estonian
