= Ratasjärv =

Lake in Estonia

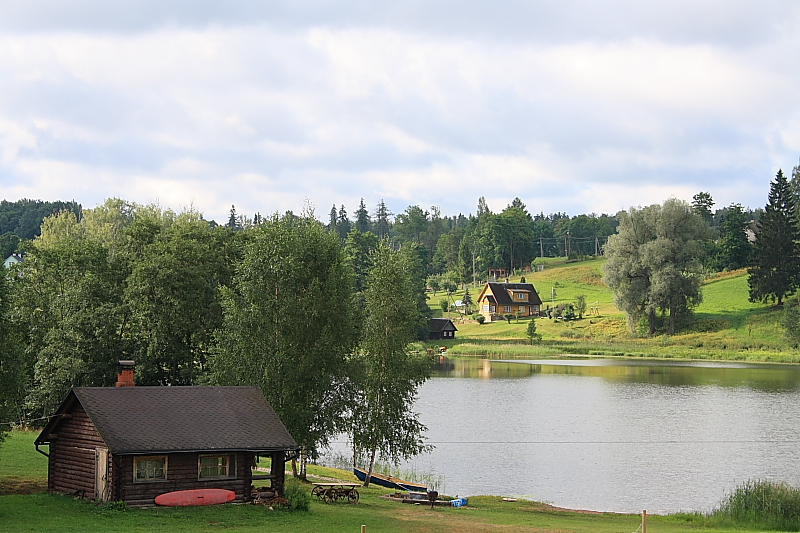

- Location within Estonia
- Location: Rõuge Parish, Võru County
- Coordinates: 57°44′0″N 26°54′39″E
- Basin countries: Estonia
- Max. length: 570 meters (1,870 ft)
- Max. width: 225 meters (738 ft)
- Surface area: 6.8 hectares (17 acres)
- Average depth: 8.6 meters (28 ft)
- Max. depth: 23.5 meters (77 ft)
- Water volume: 588,000 cubic meters (20,800,000 cu ft)
- Shore length^{1}: 1,370 meters (4,490 ft)
- Surface elevation: 108.4 meters (356 ft)
- ^{1} Shore length is not a well-defined measure.

Ratasjärv (also known as (Rõuge Ratasjärv) is a lake in Estonia. It is located in the settlement of Rõuge in Rõuge Parish, Võru County, with a small corner in the neighboring village of Möldri.

== Physical description ==
The lake has an area of 6.8 hectares (17 acres). The lake has an average depth of 8.6 meters (28 ft) and a maximum depth of 23.5 meters (77 ft). It is 570 meters (1,870 ft) long, and its shoreline measures 1,370 meters (4,490 ft). It has a volume of 588,000 cubic meters (20,800,000 cu ft).

== See also ==
- List of lakes of Estonia
