= Eduard Ole =

Estonian painter

- Born: 20 May 1898; Kaagjärve, Kreis Werro, Governorate of Livonia
- Died: 24 November 1995 (aged 97); Stockholm, Sweden
- Education: Imperial Academy of Arts, St. Petersburg, Russia
- Known for: Painting
- Notable work: Still Life with a Guitar, 1925; Passengers, 1929; Portrait of Conductor Simm, 1931
- Movement: Expressionism, Cubism, Post-Impressionism

Eduard Ole (20 May 1898 – 24 November 1995) was an Estonian painter. Some of his most representative works are on permanent exhibition at the Kumu Art Museum of Estonia.

In 1973, Ole published in Sweden his two-volume illustrated memoirs Suurel maanteel ("On the Big Highway") I and II. A new edition of these books were published in Estonia in 2010.

== Expressionism, Cubism ==
Ole was the seventh child in a farmer's family with eight children. Very young, Ole came in contact with modern western art by means of reproductions in the art school library and by visiting galleries and museums in Saint Petersburg and Moscow. He studied at the Imperial Academy of Arts in St. Petersburg, Russia between 1914 and 1918, where he became particularly influenced by German Expressionism.

Ole returned to Estonia in 1918, when his country became independent, and worked as a theatre designer, teacher of drawing, art critic and as of 1923, as a professional artist. That year, together with Friedrich Hist (1900–1941) and Felix Randel (1901–1977, named Johansen until 1936) he formed the Group of Estonian Artists in Tartu. This group was able to organize a whole series of exhibitions dedicated to Cubism experimentation, although Ole himself never became totally non-figurative, retaining a strong link with the material world. Their work was primarily distinguished by modest geometricized abstraction and decorative colourism suggested by Synthetic Cubism, rather than by explorations of simultaneity or collage. A good example of this phase is the work Natüürmort kitarriga (English: Still life with a guitar) of 1925.

Ole's cubist period lasted only until 1926. That year he began to draw with India ink. Some examples of this phase are the works Rannal (English: At the Beach) of 1926, Jalgpallurid (English: Football players) of between 1926 and 1927, Seltskond (English: A Company) and Fokstrott (English: Foxtrot) both of 1927.

== Trips to Paris and Portraits ==
In 1925 Ole had his works exhibited in Paris at the Salon des Artistes Indépendants organized by the Société des Artistes Indépendants, to which followed a study trip to Paris in 1927, a trip that gave him fresh impulses. During this trip Ole painted motives inspired in the city such as Pariisi motiiv (English: Parisian motif), Pariis, Eiffeli torn (English: Eiffel Tower, Paris), and Pariis (English: Paris).

As a consequence to Ole's first study trip to Paris, the cubist severity of form vanished and he preferred to depict large figurative compositions, dramatically staged, with soft planes and colours and nuanced pastel tones. It was during this time (1929) that Reisijad (English: Passengers) and Hobuseujutajad. Pannoo kavand (English: Horse Swimmers. Mural Design) were composed. Along these, with the watercolours in soft tones that Ole brought from Paris, he also made colourful gouaches of Estonian landscapes, such as Lõuna-Eesti maastik (English: South Estonian Landscape) of 1932–1933.

In the beginning of the 1930s Ole started painting portraits of Estonian cultural personalities of international standing. The series started with Dirigent Simmi portree (English: Portrait of Conductor Simm) in 1931, which won the first prize of a national portrait contest. Others followed such as H. Visnapuu portree (English: Portrait of H. Visnapuu) and Kirjanik August Gailiti portree (English: Portrait of Writer August Gailit) in 1932, Fr. Tuglase portree (English: Portrait of Fr. Tuglas) of between 1935 and 1942, and Konstantin Pätsi portree (English: Portrait of Konstantin Päts) of 1936.

In 1937 Ole made a second study trip to Paris and after the trip he continued to paint landscapes, though it can be noticed, entwined with pastel colours, an increasing drama, as if sensing the new challenges that would face him in the near future. In 1941 Ole painted Narva Hermani kindlus (English: Hermann Castle in Narva). The 1942 paintings Maastik rahutu taevaga (English: Landscape in Turbulent Sky) and Maastik tuulikuga (English: Landscape with a Windmill) seem to close this phase of his work.

== North Scandinavian Landscapes ==
In 1939 Ole married the philologist Helmi Metsvahi.

As a consequence to the German occupation of Estonia during World War II (1941–1944) and fleeing the Soviet occupation of Estonia (1944), Ole left as a refugee to Finland in 1943, where he continued to paint portraits of personalities of Finnish cultural life, such as the ones of the linguist Lauri Kettunen and of Viljo Tarkiainen, biographer of Aleksis Kivi, and landscapes. His wife stayed in Estonia.

However, fleeing the Continuation War between Finland and the Soviet Union in 1944, Ole moved to neutral Sweden and became a Swedish citizen in 1951. He was able to visit Estonia once again only in 1990, shortly before the restoration of Estonian independence.

In Sweden Ole started working as illustrator for the Nordic Museum in Stockholm, taking part in a project to catalogue cultural monuments of Sweden, as well as some works of scientific nature. However, as he settled down and particularly after travelling to Lapland and northern Norway his style began to radically change. During those trips Ole's sensibility experienced a new type of light, powerful natural forms, contrasts of colour and structure, of rocks and water found on fjords. In fact, his next creative period is entirely centered in North Scandinavian landscape. Ole left his earlier calm and transcending planes of restrained colours to scintillating, vibrating, and dramatic compositions. Post-impressionist Pointillism became strong although never dominant.

Ole's style evolution can be clearly noticed in his 1948 paintings Motiiv Stockholmi saarestikust I (English: Motif from the Stockholm Archipelago I), Motiiv Stockholmi saarestikust II (English: Motif from the Stockholm Archipelago II), and Kodusadamasse saabumine (English: Arrival at the Home Port). Further evolution with loss of clear contours and increasing vibrant colours is clear in the 1952 Teekond Jotunheimi mägedesse (English: A Journey to the Jotunheimen Mountains) and 1966 Maastik Lofootidelt (English: Lofoten Landscape). Such works, particularly their expressionist dynamism of colour, have a definite influence of other Nordic artists, such as Edvard Munch, Ernst Josephson, and Akseli Gallen-Kallela.

During the late 1960s and early 1970s Ole's style underwent a new and unexpected metamorphosis, returning to a cubist simplification of forms and gentle planes and motives, moving from landscape painting towards figurative compositions. These figures, almost naturalistic but simplified in a classical manner, attain a synthesis of Cubism-Naïvism. The result of this last change can be noticed on Ole's self-portrait of 1979 Autoportree, on the 1988 Motiiv Stockholmist (English: Motif from Stockholm), and on the 1991 Uue pesa ehitamine. Eskiis (English: Construction of a New Nest. Sketch).

In 1981 Ole was granted the Culture Award of Estonians in Sweden.

Ole was buried at the Metsakalmistu (Forest Cemetery) in Tallinn.
