= Võro language =

Dialect of the South Estonian language

Võro
- võro kiilʼ
- Native to: Estonia
- Region: Southern Estonia
- Ethnicity: Võros
- Native speakers: 72,000 (2021)
- Language family: Uralic: Finnic; South Estonian; Ugala; Ugandi; Võro-Seto; Võro
- Writing system: Latin

Official status
- Regulated by: Võro Institute (semi-official)

Language codes
- ISO 639-3: vro
- Glottolog: voro1243
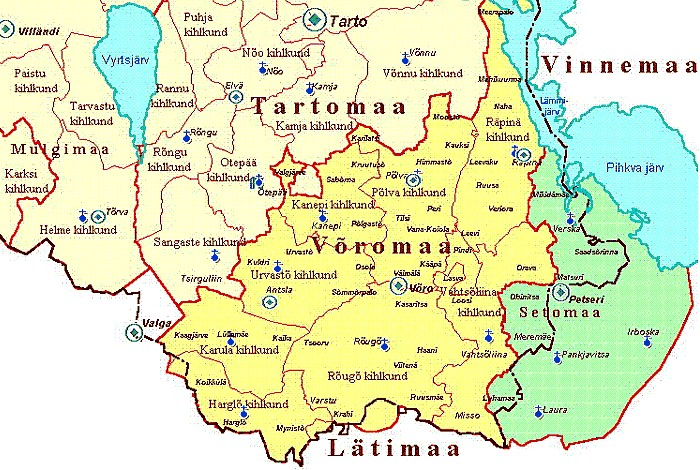
- Võro language area—Võromaa (Võro county) in its historical boundaries between Tartu and Seto areas, Russia (Vinnemaa) and Latvia (Lätimaa)

- Võro is classified as Definitely Endangered by the UNESCO Atlas of the World's Languages in Danger.

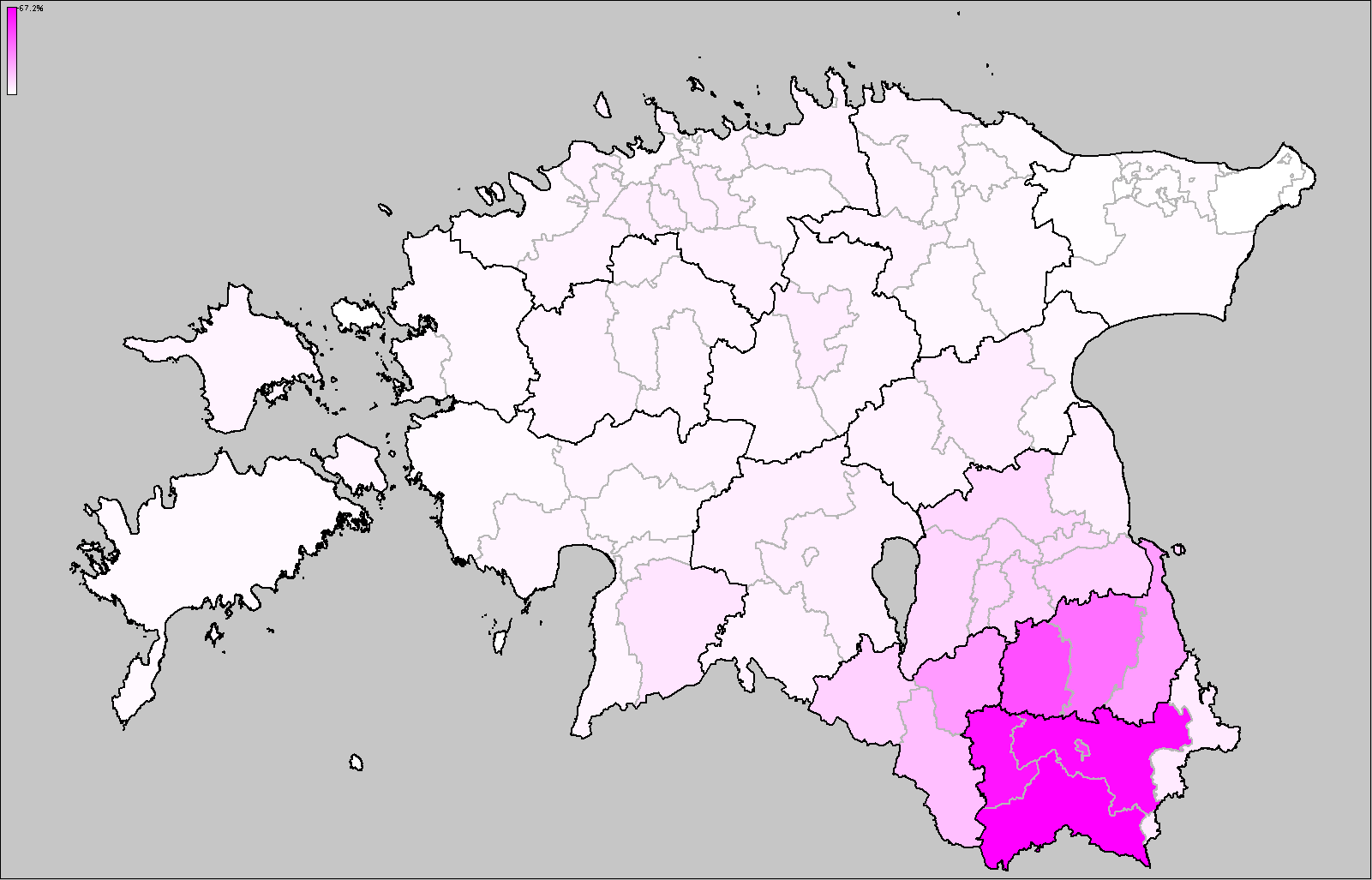
Distribution of Võro speakers according to the 2021 census

A Võro speaker

A girl speaks Võro.

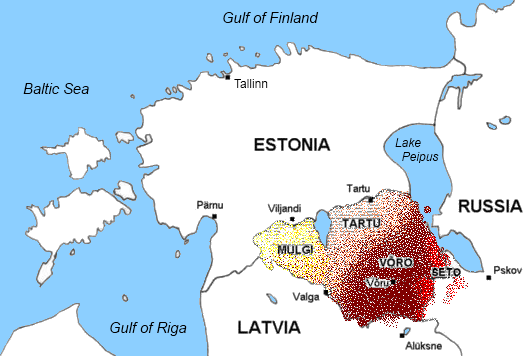
South Estonian today. Võro is marked with dark red colour.

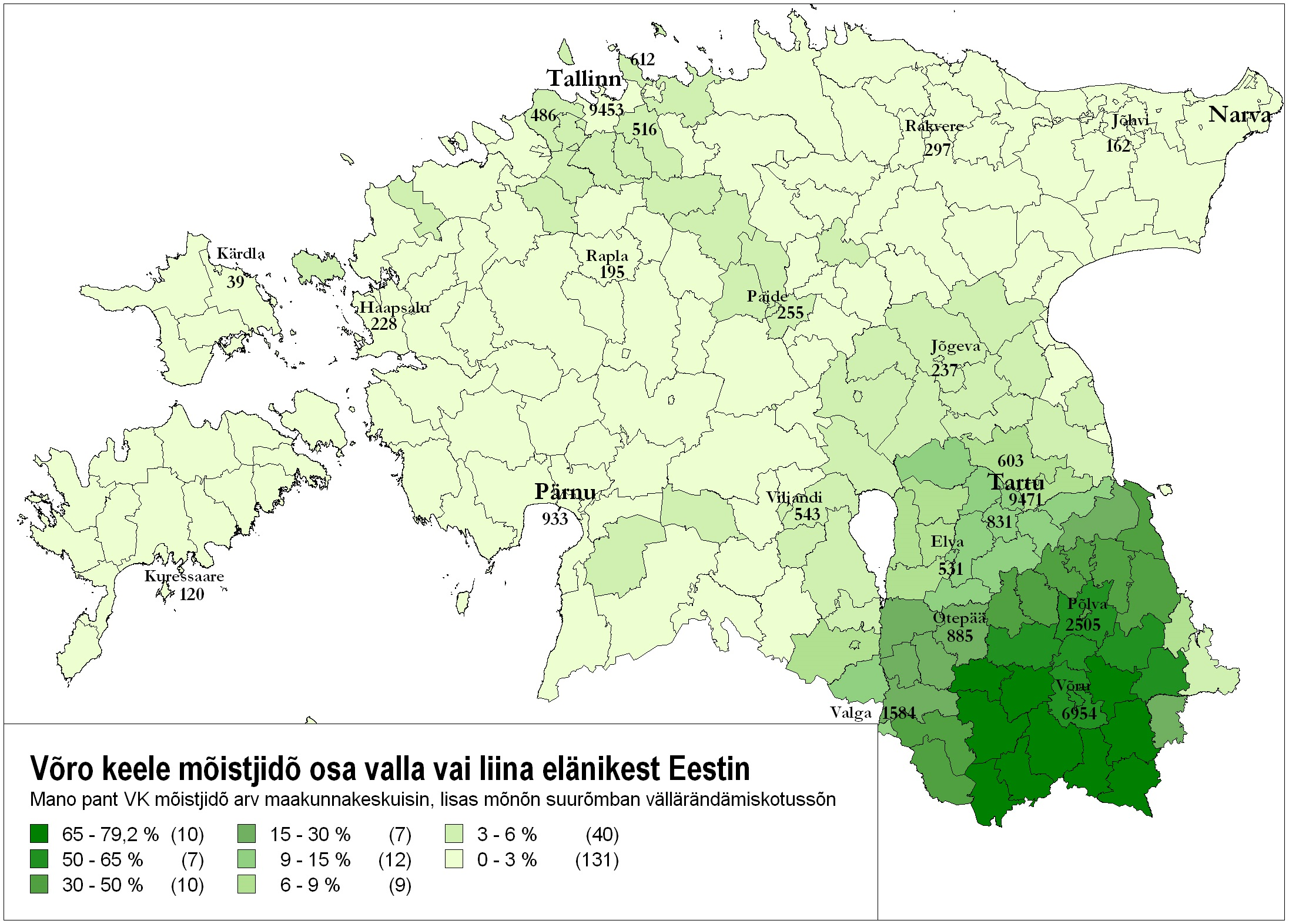
Percentage of Võro speakers in Estonian municipalities according to the Estonian census 2011

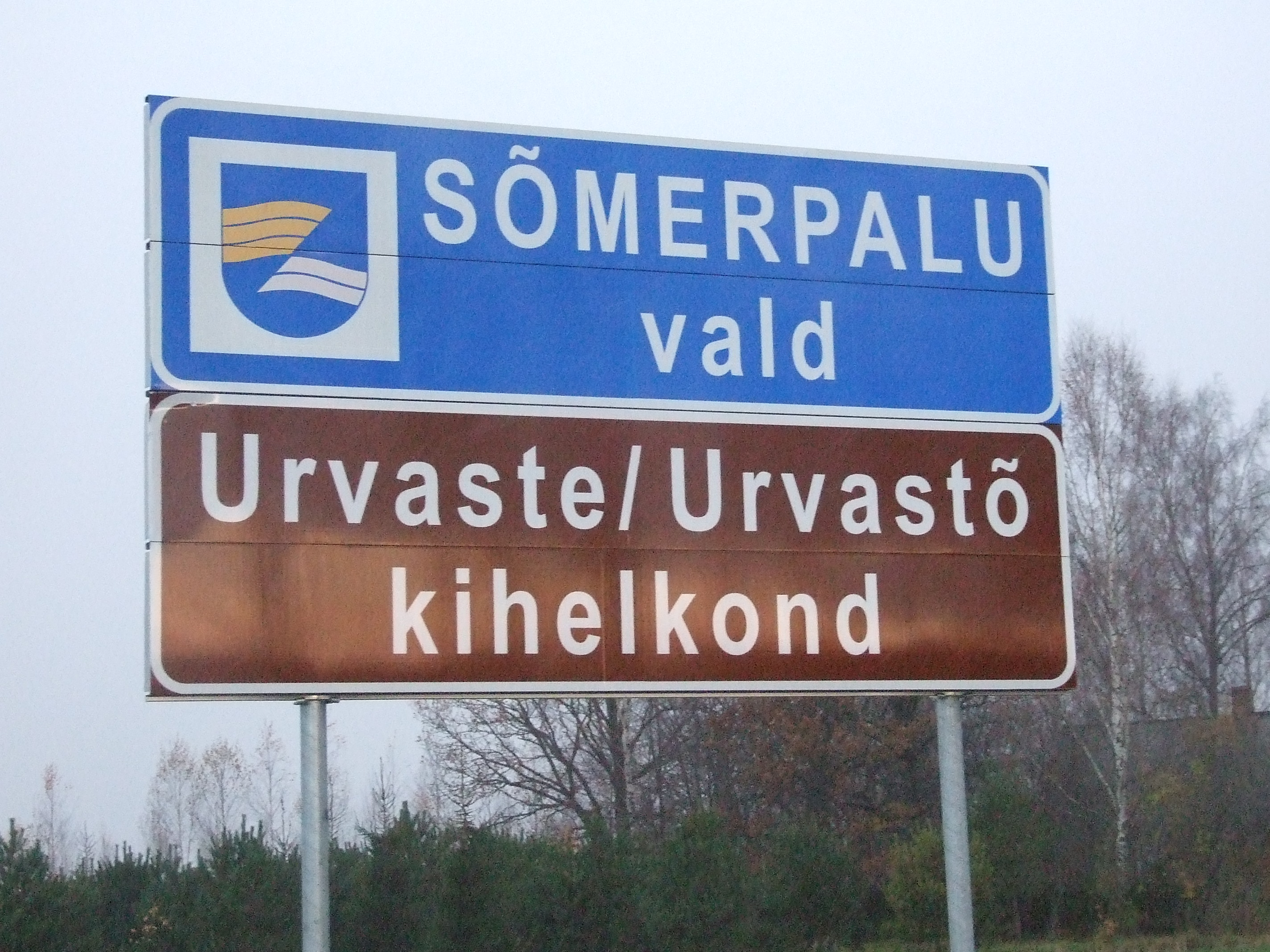
A bilingual Estonian-Võro parish sign in Võrumaa. The parish name with vowel harmony (Urvastõ) is in Võro.

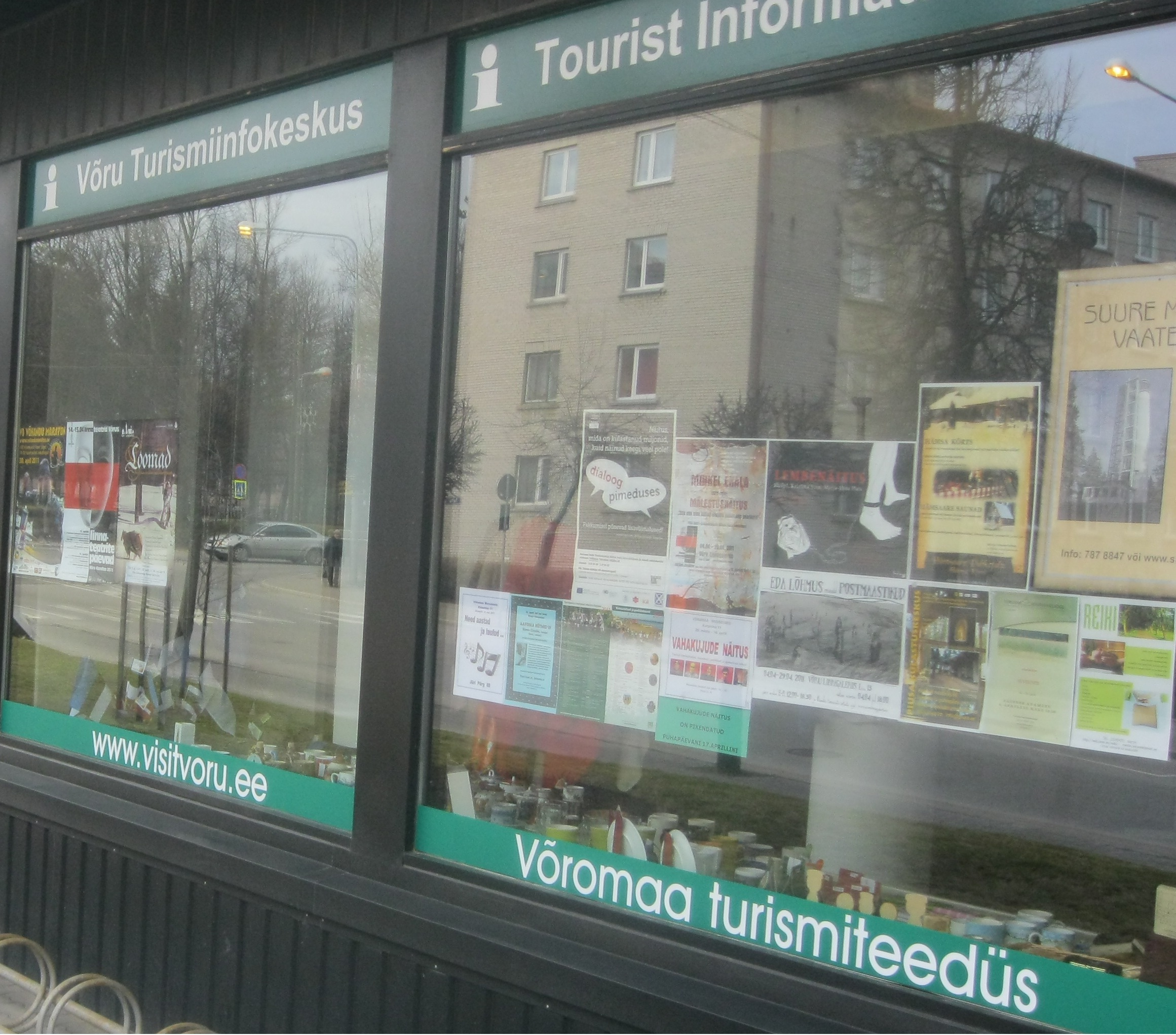
A trilingual (Estonian–English–Võro) sign on a tourist information center in Võru

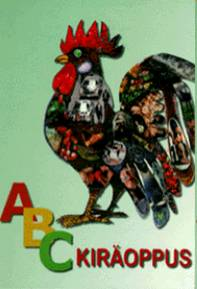
A 1998 ABC-book in Võro language written by Sulev Iva, Kauksi Ülle etc.: ABC kiräoppus

Võro (/ˈvɒroʊ/ VORR-oh; Võro: võro kiilʼ [ˈvɤro kʲiːlʲ], Estonian: võru keel) is a South Estonian language. It has its own literary standard and efforts have been undertaken to seek official recognition as an indigenous regional language of Estonia. Võro has roughly 75,000 speakers (Võros), mostly in southeastern Estonia, in the eight parishes of the historical Võru County: Karula, Harglõ, Urvastõ, Rõugõ, Kanepi, Põlva, Räpinä and Vahtsõliina. These parishes are currently centred (due to redistricting) in Võru and Põlva counties, with parts extending into Valga and Tartu counties. Speakers can also be found in the cities of Tallinn, Tartu, and the rest of Estonia.

== History ==
Võro is a descendant of the old South Estonian regional language and is the least influenced by Standard Estonian (which is based on Northern Estonian dialects). Võro was once spoken further south and east of historical Võromaa in South Estonian-speaking enclaves Ludza, Leivu and Kraasna in what is now Latvia and Russia. In addition to Võro, other contemporary South Estonian dialects are Mulgi, Tartu and Seto.

One of the earliest written evidences of South Estonian is a translation of the New Testament (Wastne Testament) published in 1686. Although the status of South Estonian began to diminish after the 1880s, the language began to undergo a revival in the late 1980s.

== Present situation ==
Today, Võro is used in the works of some of Estonia's best-known playwrights, poets, and authors (Madis Kõiv, Ülle Kauksi, Jaan Kaplinski, Ain Kaalep, etc.). One newspaper is printed in Võro: the fortnightly Uma Leht (literally Our Own Newspaper). Twenty-six public schools offer weekly special classes (mostly extracurricular) in modern Võro.

Estonia's contribution to the Eurovision Song Contest 2004 was the song "Tii", which was performed by Neiokõsõ in Võro.

The language is endangered, and according to Kadri Koreinik this is due to the government's lack of legal commitment to protect the language.

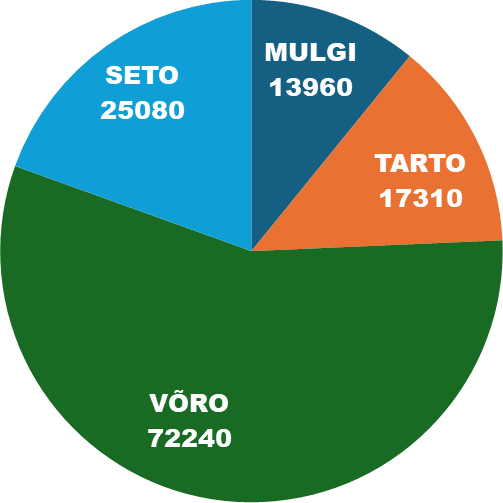
According to the 2021 Estonia census there were 128,590 speakers of South Estonian: 97,320 speakers of Võro (72,240 when excluding 25,080 Seto speakers), 17,310 Tartu language speakers and 13,960 Mulgi speakers.

== Phonology ==
=== Vowels ===
	Front		Back	
	unrounded	rounded	unrounded	rounded
Close	i	y	ɨ	u
Mid	e	ø	ɤ	o
Open	æ		ɑ	

==== Vowel harmony ====
Võro has preserved the system of vowel harmony that was present in Proto-Finnic. This distinguishes it from Estonian and some other Finnic languages, which have lost it.

The vowel harmony system distinguishes front, back and neutral vowels, much like the system found in Finnish. A word cannot contain both front and back vowels; suffixes automatically adapt the backness of the vowels depending on the type of vowels found in the word it is attached to. Neutral vowels can be combined with either type of vowel, although a word that contains only neutral vowels has front vowel harmony. The only neutral vowel is i, like in Votic but unlike Finnish and Karelian, where e is also neutral.

Võro vowel harmony
	Front	Back
Close rounded	y	u
Close unrounded	i (ɨ*)	
Mid rounded	ø	o
Mid unrounded	e	ɤ
Open	æ	ɑ

- The vowel ɨ (in the Võro orthography written with õ or y, see Orthography section) is considered a back vowel for harmony purposes, but does not participate in harmony itself, as it does not occur in suffixes and endings.

Some examples, with Estonian and Finnish included for comparison:

Võro	Estonian	Finnish	Meaning
külä	küla	kylä	village
küsünüq	küsinud	kysynyt	asked
hõbõhõnõ	hõbedane	hopeinen	silver (adj.)

=== Consonants ===
		Labial		Alveolar		Palatal	Velar		Glottal	
		plain	pala.	plain	pala.	Palatal	plain	pala.	plain	pala.
Nasal		m	mʲ	n	nʲ		ŋ	ŋʲ		
Plosive		p	pʲ	t	tʲ		k	kʲ	ʔ	
Affricate				ts	tsʲ					
Fricative	voiceless	f	fʲ	s	sʲ				h	hʲ
Fricative	voiced	v	vʲ							
Approximant				l	lʲ	j				
Trill				r	rʲ					

All Võro consonants (except /j/ and /ʔ/) can be palatalized. The glottal stop (q, IPA [ʔ]) is a very common sound in Võro.

== Orthography ==
Võro employs the Latin script, like Estonian and Finnish.

А /ɑ/	B /p/	C /t͡s/	D /t/	E /e/	F /f/	G /k/	H /h/	I /i/	J /j/	K /k/
L /l/	M /m/	N /n/	O /o/	P /p/	Q /ʔ/	R /r/	S /s/	Š /ʃ/	T /t/	U /u/
V /v/	W /v/	Õ /ɤ/	Ä /æ/	Ö /ø/	Ü /y/	X /ks/	Y /ɨ/	Z /s/	Ž /ʃ/	´ /◌ʲ/

Most letters (including ä, ö, ü, and õ) denote the same sounds as in Estonian, with a few exceptions. The letter q stands for the glottal stop /ʔ/ and y denotes /ɨ/, a vowel very close to Russian ы (from 2005 written õ).

Palatalization of consonants is marked with an acute accent (´) or apostrophe (' or ʼ). In proper typography and in handwriting, the palatalization mark does not extend above the cap height (except uppercase letters Ń, Ŕ, Ś, V́ etc.), and it is written above the letter if the letter has no ascender (ǵ, ḿ, ń, ṕ, ŕ, ś, v́ etc.) but written to the right of it otherwise (b', d', f', h', k', l', t'). In some sources, an apostrophe is placed after the letter in all cases.

== Grammar ==
=== Nouns ===
Endings are shown only in the back vowel harmony variant. The e of the illative ending does not undergo vowel harmony, so it never changes to õ.

Only the more common endings are shown. There are some unusual/irregular endings that are only found in a few words or word types.

Case	Singular ending	Plural ending	Meaning/use
Nominative (nimekäänüs)	-∅	-q	Subject
Accusative	-∅	-q	Telic/complete object
Genitive (umakäänüs)	-∅	-i, -(i)dõ	Possession, relation
Partitive (osakäänüs)	-∅, -d, -t	-i, -id, -it	Atelic/partial object
Illative (sissekäänüs)	-∅, -he, -htõ	-i, -(i)he, -dõhe	Motion into
Inessive (seenkäänüs)	-(h)n	-i(h)n, -(i)dõ(h)n	Being in/inside
Elative (seestkäänüs)	-st	-ist, -(i)dõst	Motion out of
Allative (päälekäänüs)	-lõ	-ilõ, -(i)dõlõ	Motion onto, towards
Adessive (päälkäänüs)	-l	-il, -(i)dõl	Being at, on
Ablative (päältkäänüs)	-lt	-ilt, -(i)dõlt	Motion off, from
Translative (saajakäänüs)	-s	-is, -(i)dõs	Changing into
Terminative (piirikäänüs)	-niq	-iniq, -(i)dõniq	Until, up to, as far as
Abessive (ilmakäänüs)	-ldaq	-ildaq, -(i)dõldaq	Without, lacking
Comitative (ütenkäänüs)	-gaq	-igaq, -(i)dõgaq	With, in company of, by means of

Notes:

- The accusative is not usually considered a separate case in Võro grammars, as it is always identical to either the nominative or the genitive.
- When an ending beginning with d is attached to a stem ending in an obstruent, it is devoiced to t automatically.

=== Verbs ===
The 3rd person singular of the indicative mood can be either without an ending or, alternatively, with an s-ending:

Võro	Estonian	Finnish	Meaning
kirotas	kirjutab	kirjoittaa	writes
and	annab	antaa	gives

Among the Finnic languages, such double verb conjugation can be found only in the South Estonian and Karelian languages.

==== Negation ====
Võro has a negative particle that is appended to the end of the verb, whereas standard Estonian and Finnish have a negative verb, which precedes the verb. In Estonian and Finnish, the negative verb ei (Finnish en/et/ei/emme/ette/eivät) is used in both present and past negation, whereas in Võro the same is expressed by different particles ending with -i(q) or -s:

Võro	Estonian	Finnish	Meaning
saq anna-aiq	sa ei anna	sinä et anna	You don't give
maq tulõ-õiq	ma ei tule	minä en tule	I don't come
saq anna-as	sa ei andnud	sinä et antanut	You didn't give
maq tulõ-õs	ma ei tulnud	minä en tullut	I didn't come

== Sample texts ==
=== Written examples ===
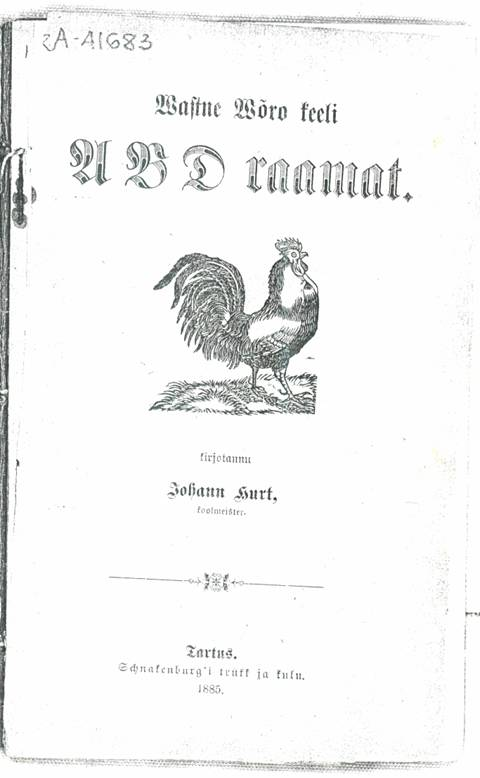
An 1885 ABC-book in Võro language written by Johann Hurt: Wastne Wõro keeli ABD raamat

Article 1 of the Universal Declaration of Human Rights in Võro:

Kyik inemiseq sünnüseq vapos ja ütesugumaidsis uma avvo ja õiguisi poolõst. Näile om annõt mudsu ja süämetunnistus ja nä piät ütsʼtõõsõga vele muudu läbi käümä.

As comparison the same sentence in Standard Estonian:

Kõik inimesed sünnivad vabadena ja võrdsetena oma väärikuselt ja õigustelt. Neile on antud mõistus ja südametunnistus ja nende suhtumist üksteisesse peab kandma vendluse vaim.

In Finnish:

Kaikki ihmiset syntyvät vapaina ja tasavertaisina arvoltaan ja oikeuksiltaan. Heille on annettu järki ja omatunto, ja heidän on toimittava toisiaan kohtaan veljeyden hengessä.

In English : All human beings are born free and equal in dignity and rights. They are endowed with reason and conscience and should act towards one another in a spirit of brotherhood.

=== Recorded videos ===
Egle speaking Võro

Sulev speaking Võro

Jaan speaking Võro

Maarika speaking Võro

Toomas speaking Võro

== See also ==
- Finnic languages
- South Estonian language
- Uma Leht, newspaper in the Võro language
- Võro Institute
