= Karula Parish =

Former municipality of Estonia

Coordinates: 57°45′19″N 26°18′01″E

Karula Parish Karula vald
- Municipality of Estonia
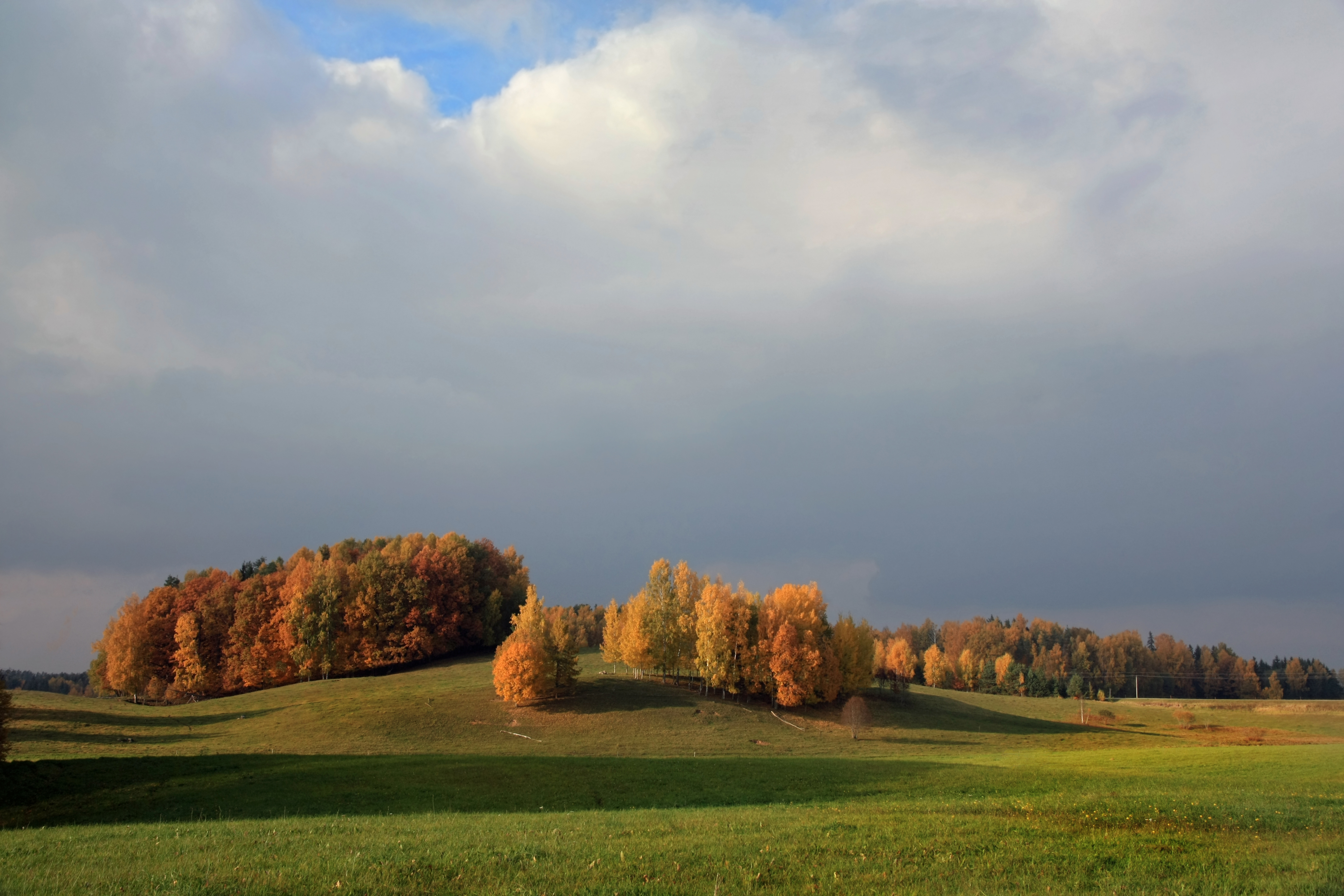
- Karula countryside

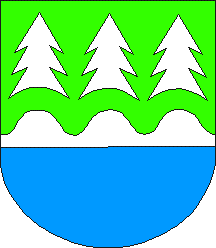
- Flag Coat of arms

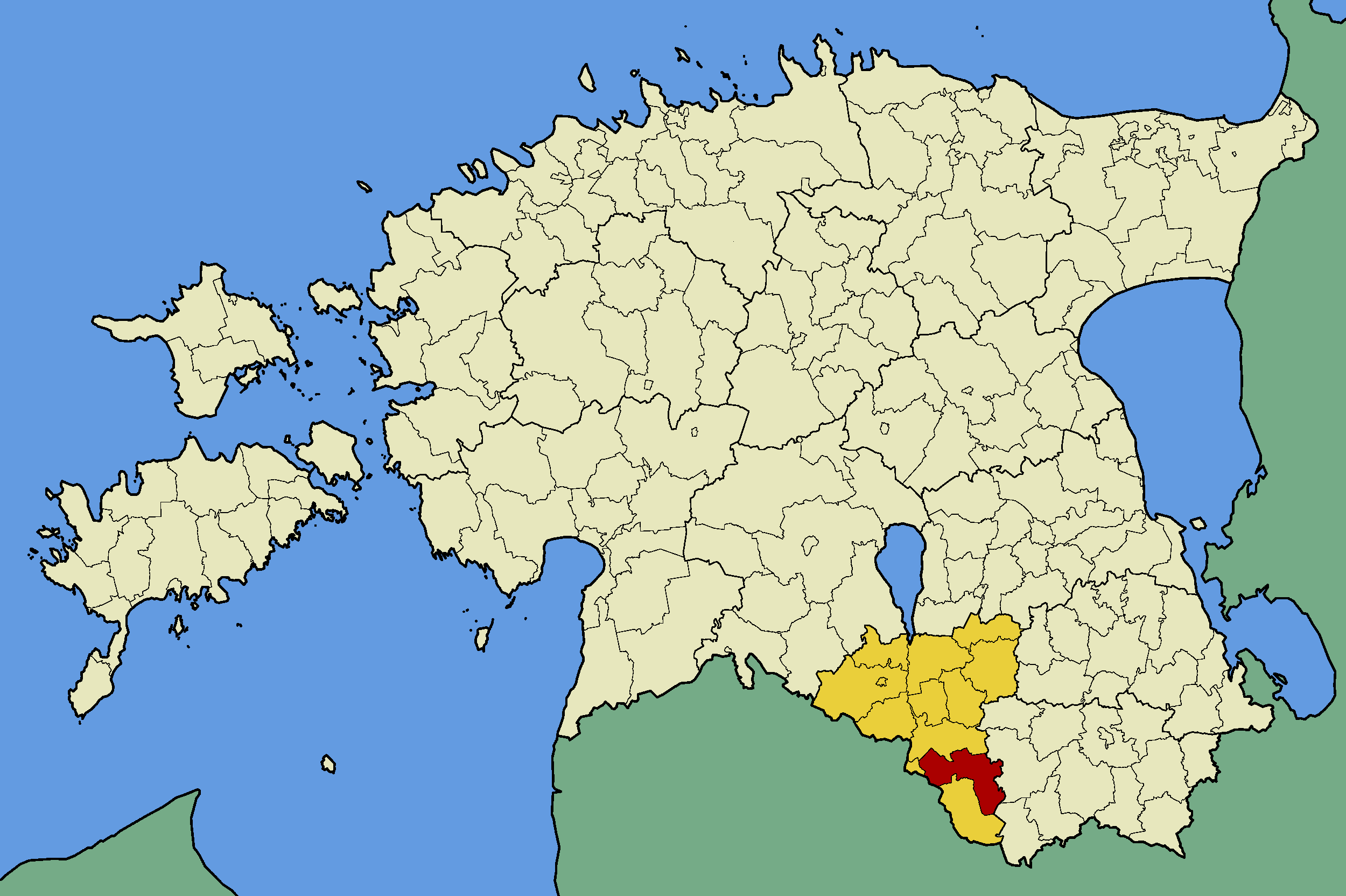
- Karula Parish within Valga County.
- Country: Estonia
- County: Valga County
- Administrative centre: Lüllemäe

Area
  - Total: 230 km^{2} (89 sq mi)

Population (01.01.2006)
  - Total: 1,101
  - Density: 4.8/km^{2} (12/sq mi)
- Website: www.karula.ee

Karula Parish (Estonian: Karula vald) was a rural municipality in Valga County, Estonia prior to the 2017 reform of Estonian municipalities.

== Settlements ==
Villages

Kaagjärve - Käärikmäe - Karula - Kirbu - Koobassaare - Londi - Lüllemäe - Lusti - Pikkjärve - Pugritsa - Raavitsa - Rebasemõisa - Väheru - Valtina
