= Kaagjärve =

Village in Estonia

- Village
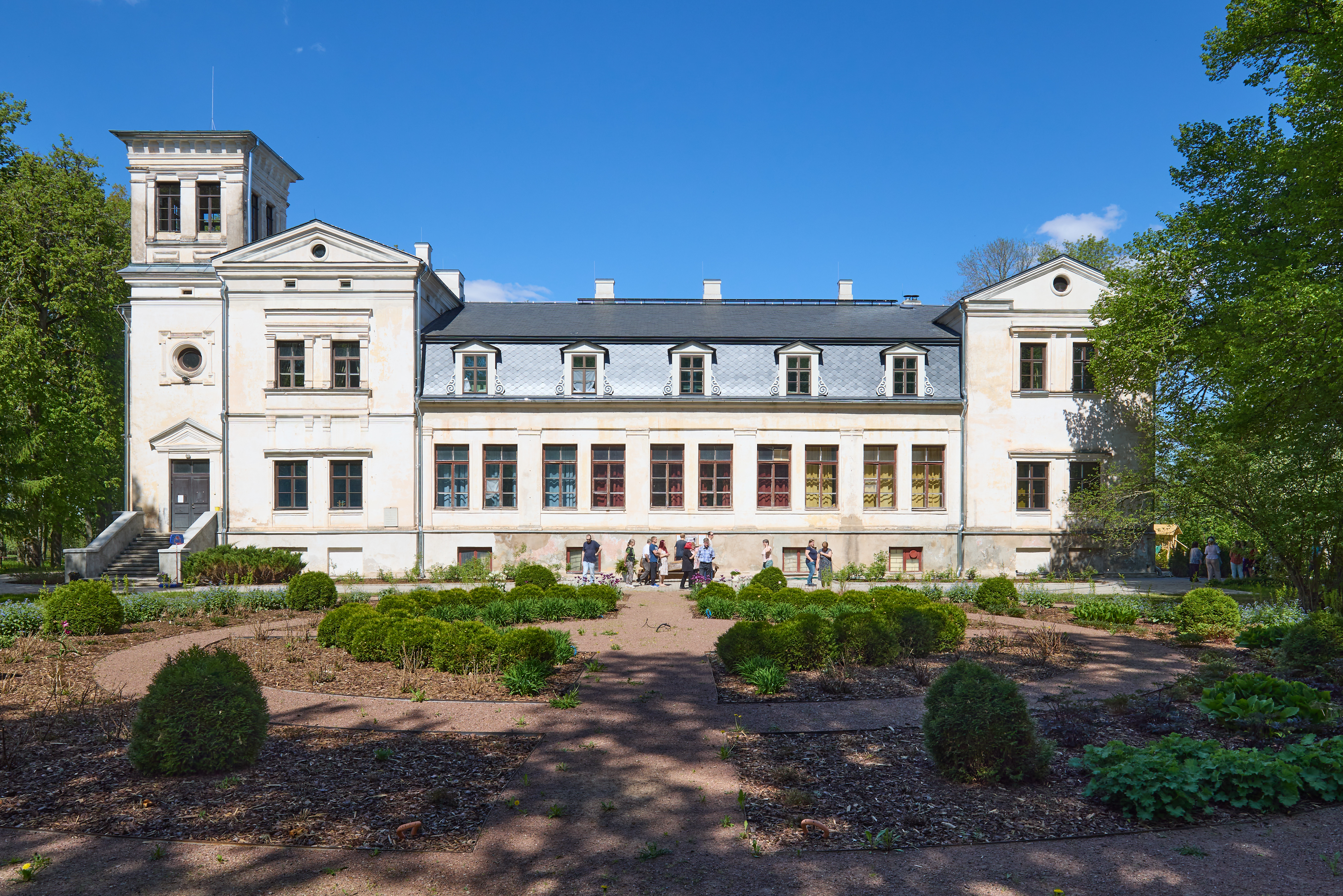
- Kaagjärve manor

- Location in Estonia
- Coordinates: 57°46′01″N 26°10′48″E
- Country: Estonia
- County: Valga County
- Municipality: Valga Parish

Population (2011 Census)
  - Total: 246

Kaagjärve (German: Kawershof) is a village in Valga Parish, Valga County, in southeastern Estonia, located about 9 km east of the border town Valga. As of the 2011 census, the settlement's population was 246.

The currently inactive Valga–Pechory railway passes Kaagjärve on its northern side, and there is a station named Ratsimäe.

Painter Eduard Ole (1898–1995), was born in Kaagjärve.
