= Hargla =

Village in Estonia

- Village
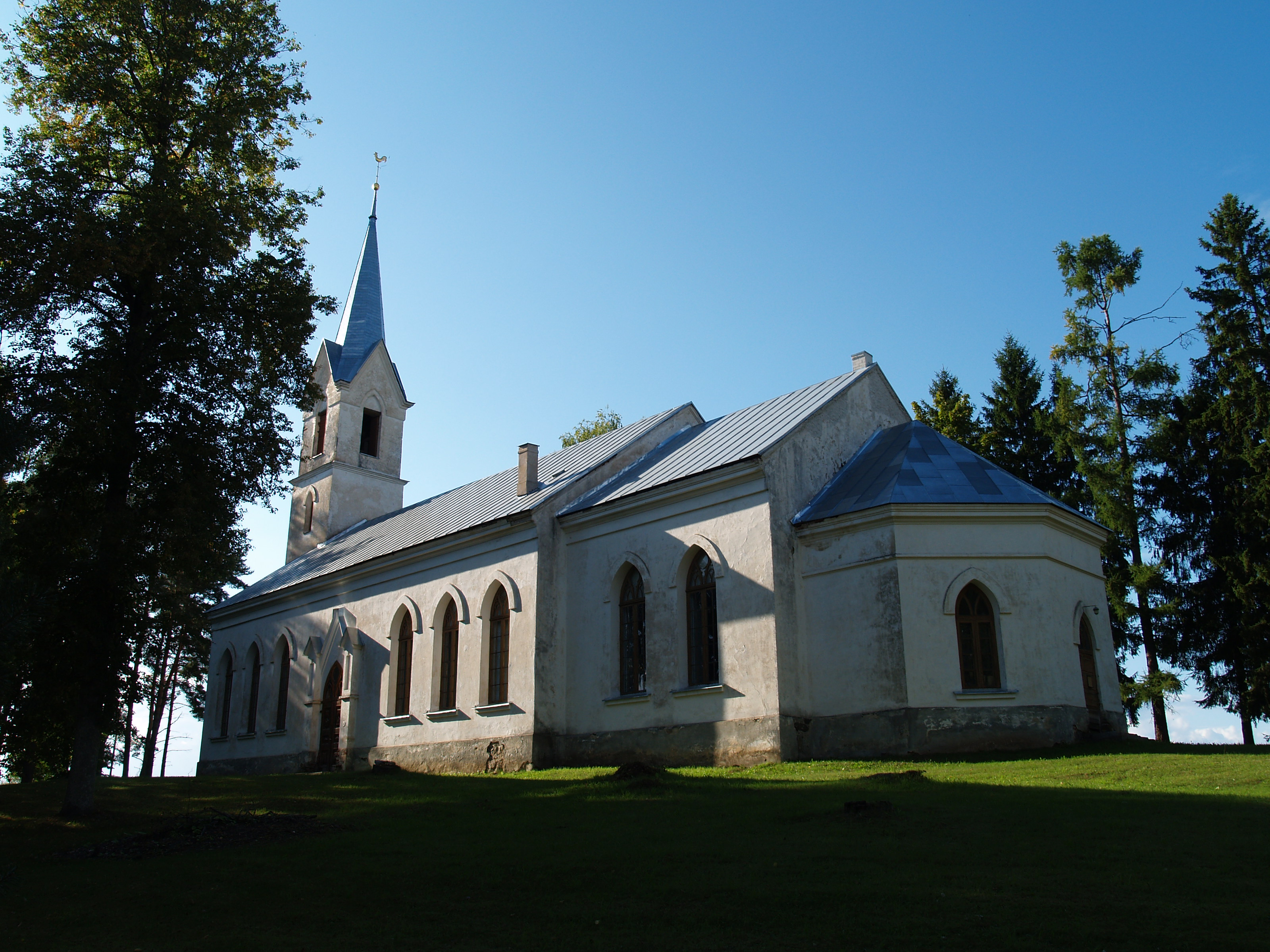
- Hargla church

- Location in Estonia
- Coordinates: 57°36′50″N 26°23′58″E
- Country: Estonia
- County: Valga County
- Municipality: Valga Parish

Population (2011 Census)
  - Total: 169

Hargla (Võro: Harglõ; German: Harjel) is a village in Valga Parish, Valga County in southern Estonia. As of the 2011 census, the settlement's population was 169. Before 2017, it was located in Taheva Parish.

== Gallery ==
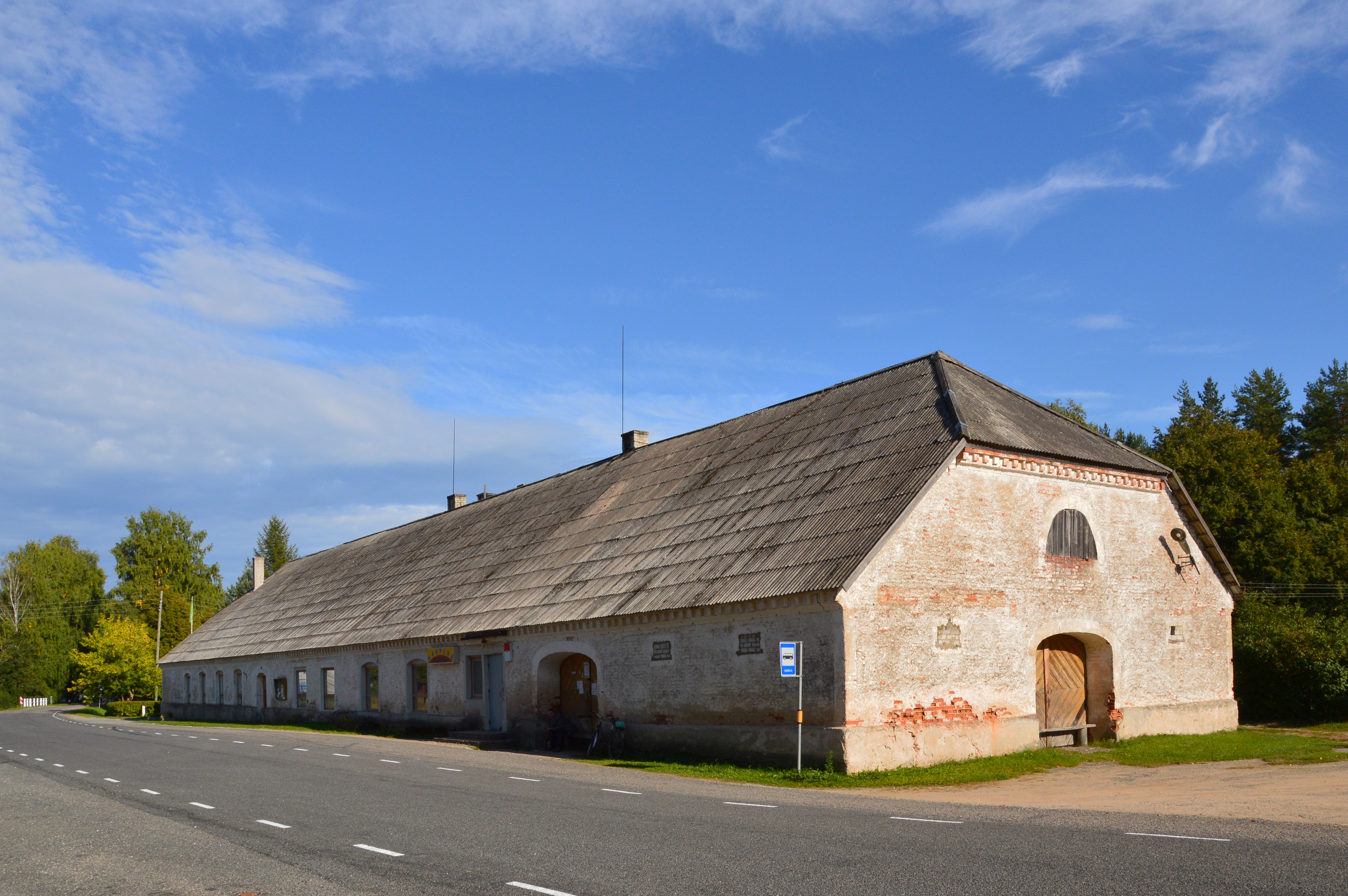
Hargla inn

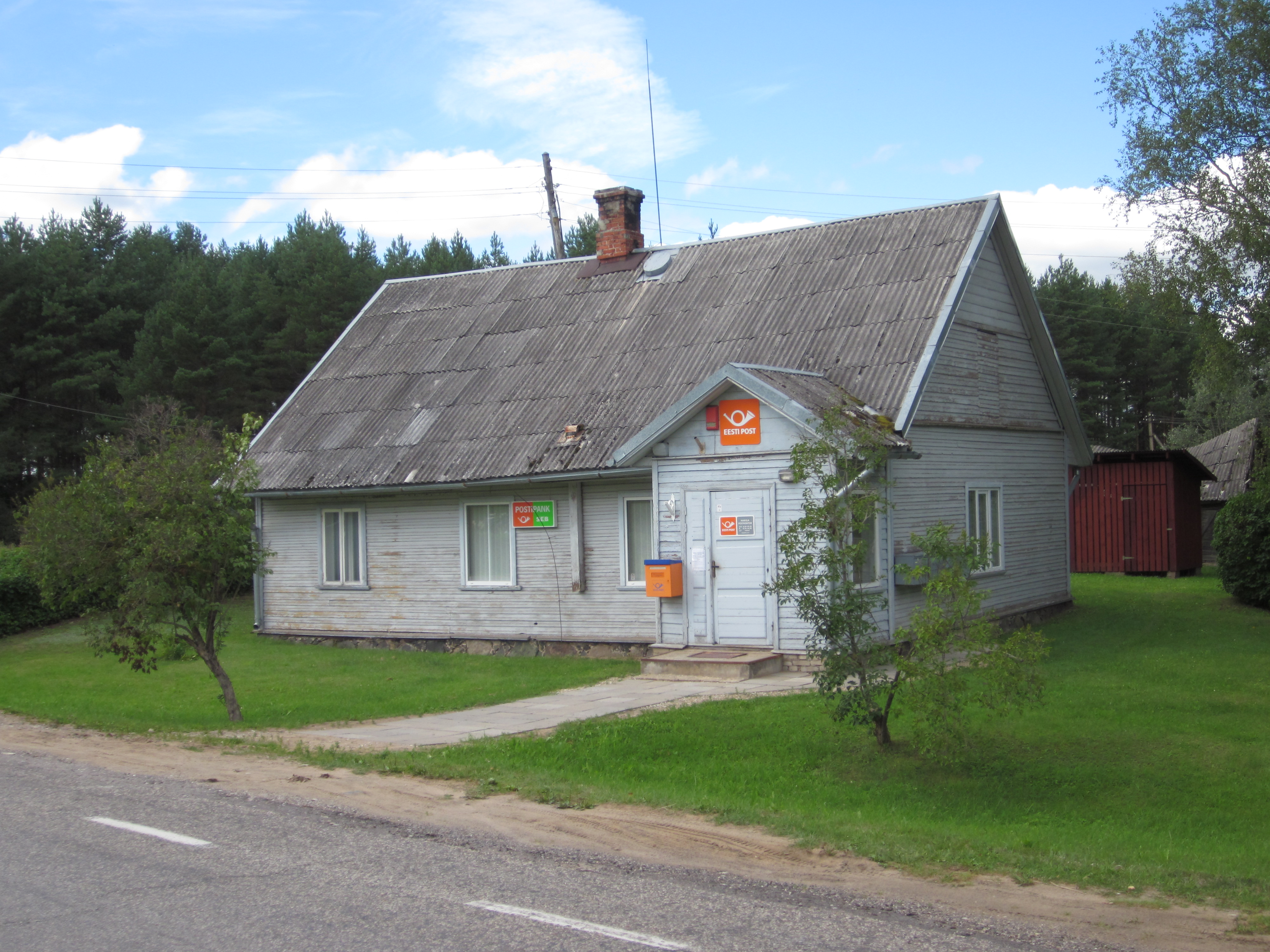
Hargla post office

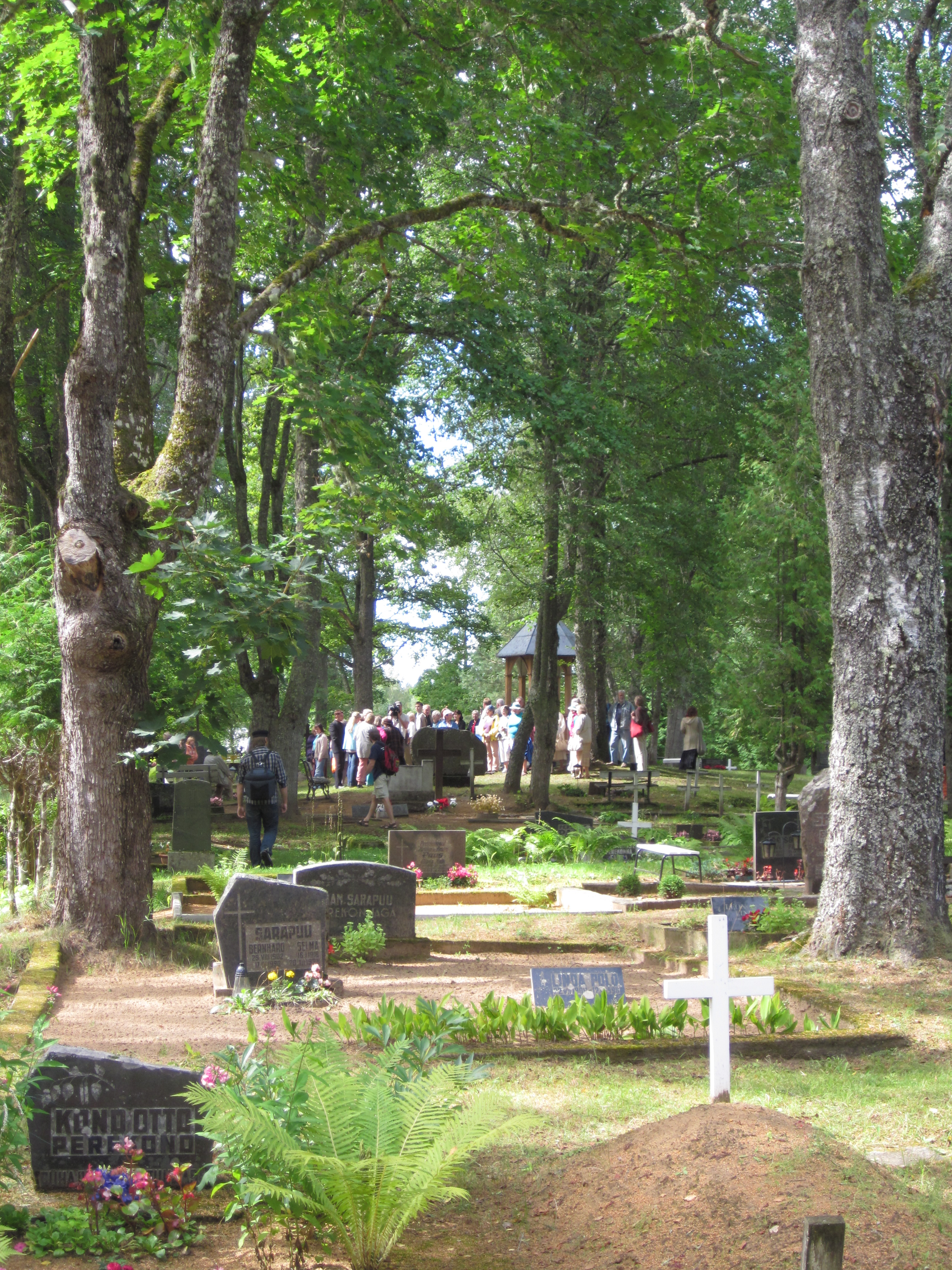
Hargla cemetery

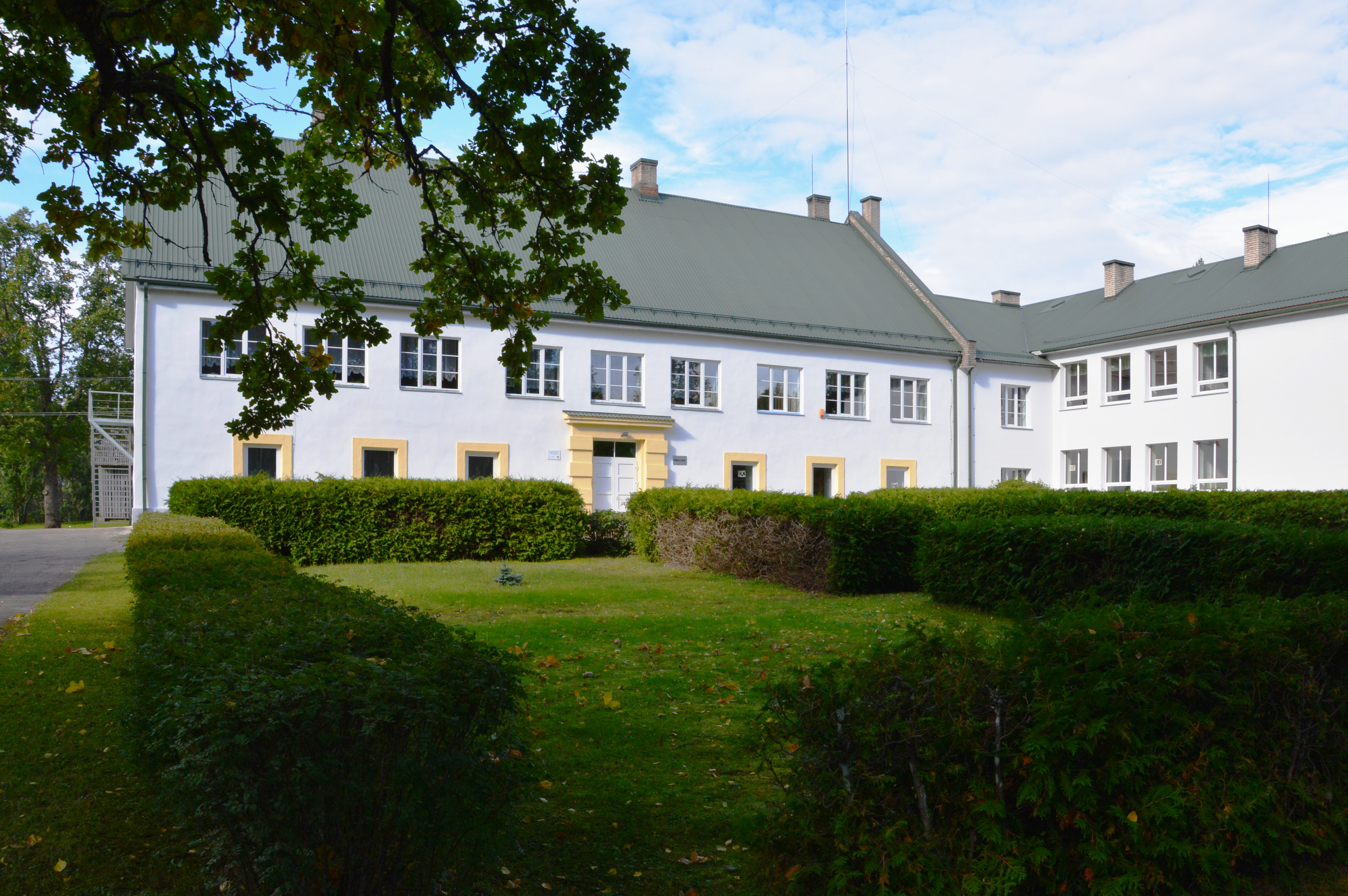
Hargla School
