= Uma Leht =

Estonian newspaper

- Type: Fortnightly newspaper
- Format: A3, 4 pages
- Owner: Foundation Võro Selts VKKF
- Editor: Ülle Harju
- Founded: 2000 as a fortnightly newspaper: 2004
- Language: Võro
- Headquarters: Võru, Estonia
- Circulation: 10,000 fortnightly
- Website: www.umaleht.ee

Uma Leht (literally Our Own Newspaper) is the only newspaper in the Võro language which is spoken in Southern Estonia. The newspaper is owned by the Foundation Võro Selts VKKF and issued every fortnight.
