= Urvaste Parish =

Former municipality of Estonia

Coordinates: 57°53′36″N 26°29′56″E

Urvaste Parish Urvaste vald (in Estonian) Urvastõ vald (in Võro)
- Former municipality of Estonia
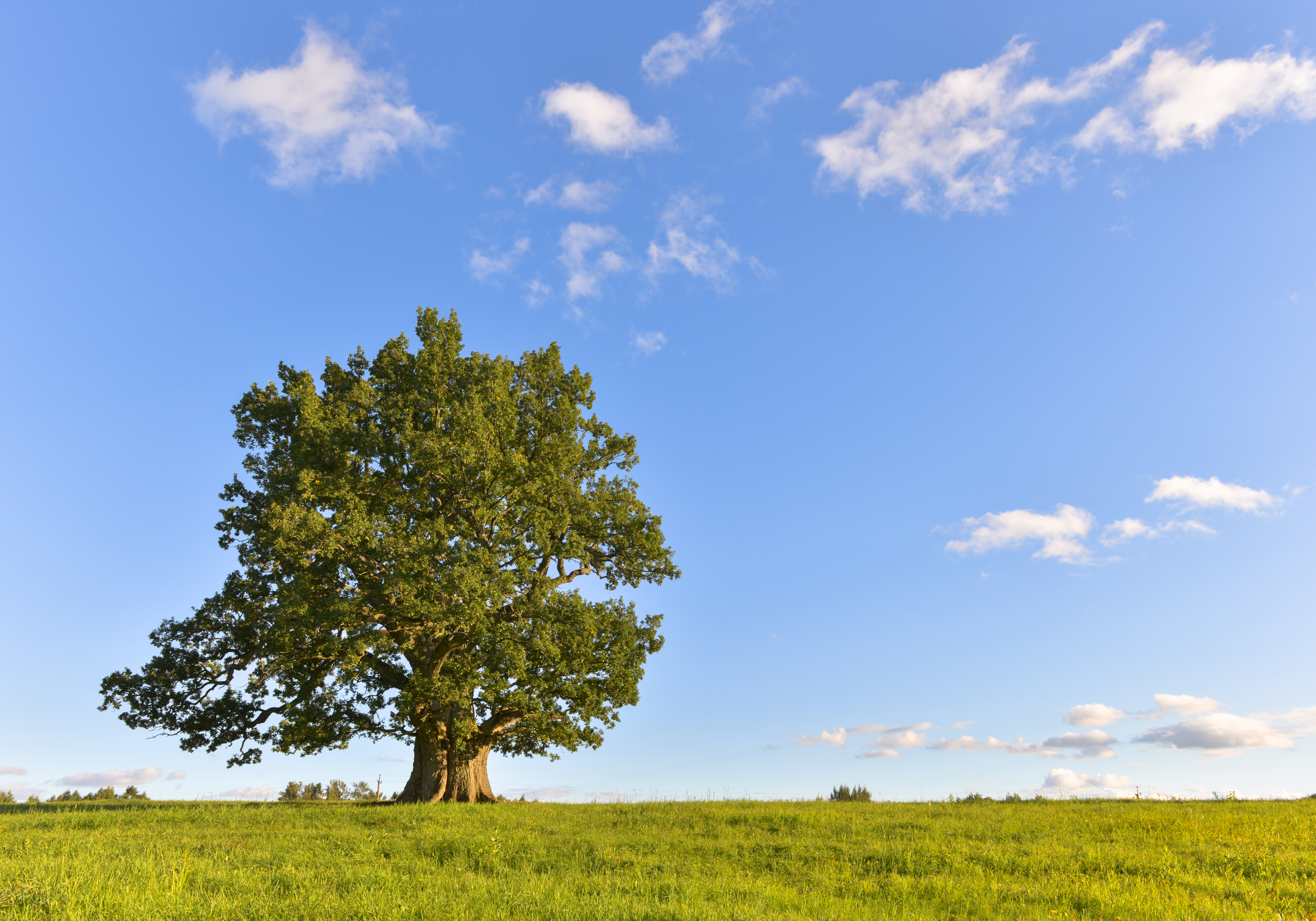
- Tamme-Lauri oak in Urvaste

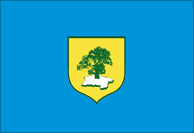
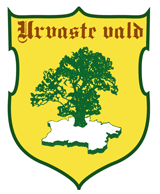
- Flag Coat of arms

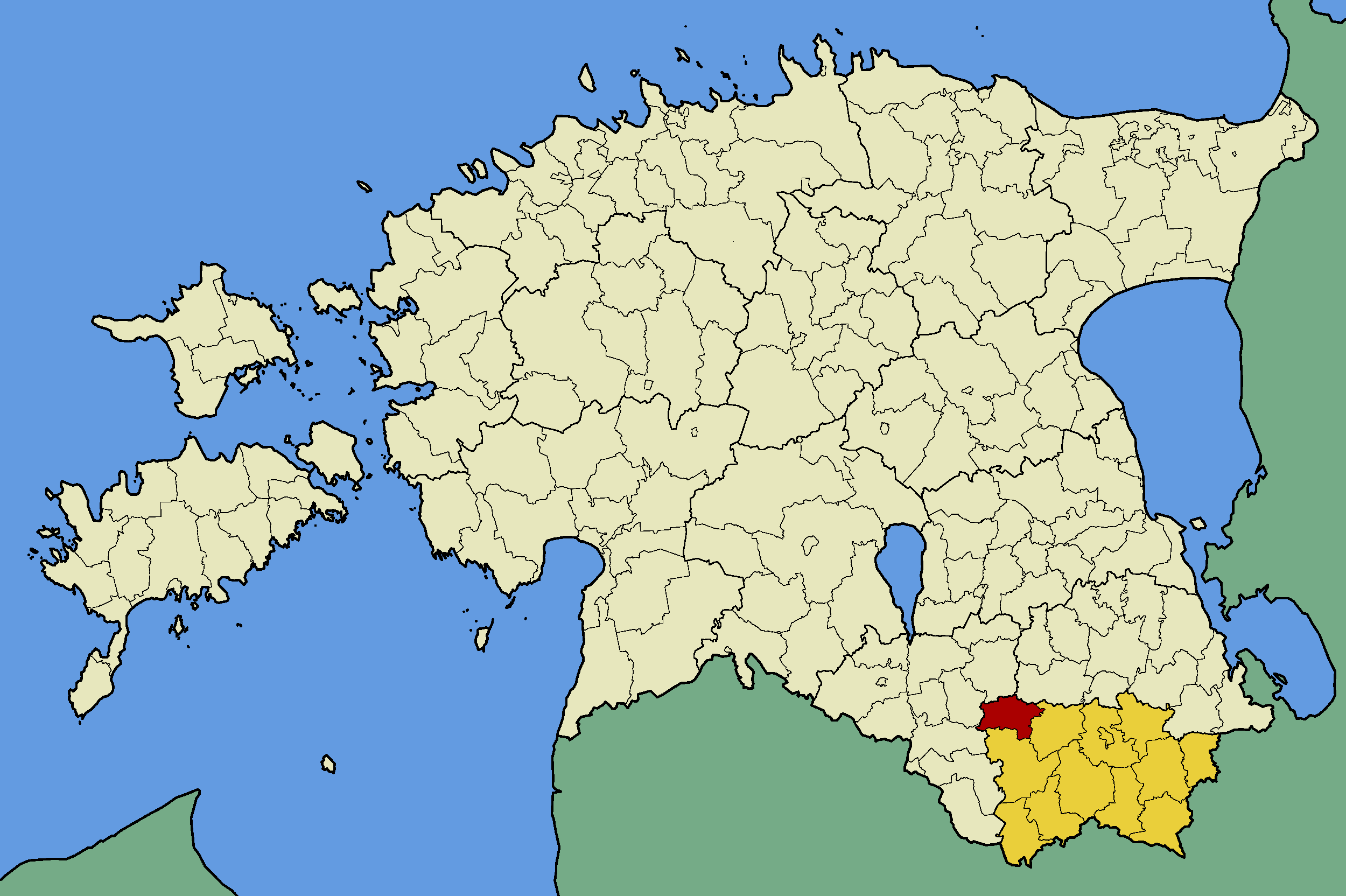
- Urvaste Parish within Võru County.
- Country: Estonia
- County: Võru County
- Administrative centre: Kuldre

Area
  - Total: 139.62 km^{2} (53.91 sq mi)

Population (01.01.2009)
  - Total: 1,413
  - Density: 10.12/km^{2} (26.21/sq mi)
- Website: www.urvaste.ee

Urvaste Parish (Estonian: Urvaste vald, Võro: Urvastõ vald) was a rural municipality of Estonia, in Võru County. It had a population of 1,413 (as of 1 January 2009) and an area of 139.62 km^{2}.

There are two main tourist attractions: Tamme-Lauri oak and Pokuland (Estonian: Pokumaa).

== Settlements ==
Villages

Kassi - Kirikuküla - Koigu - Kõlbi - Kuldre - Lümatu - Pihleni - Ruhingu - Toku - Uhtjärve - Urvaste - Uue-Antsla - Vaabina - Visela

== Gallery ==
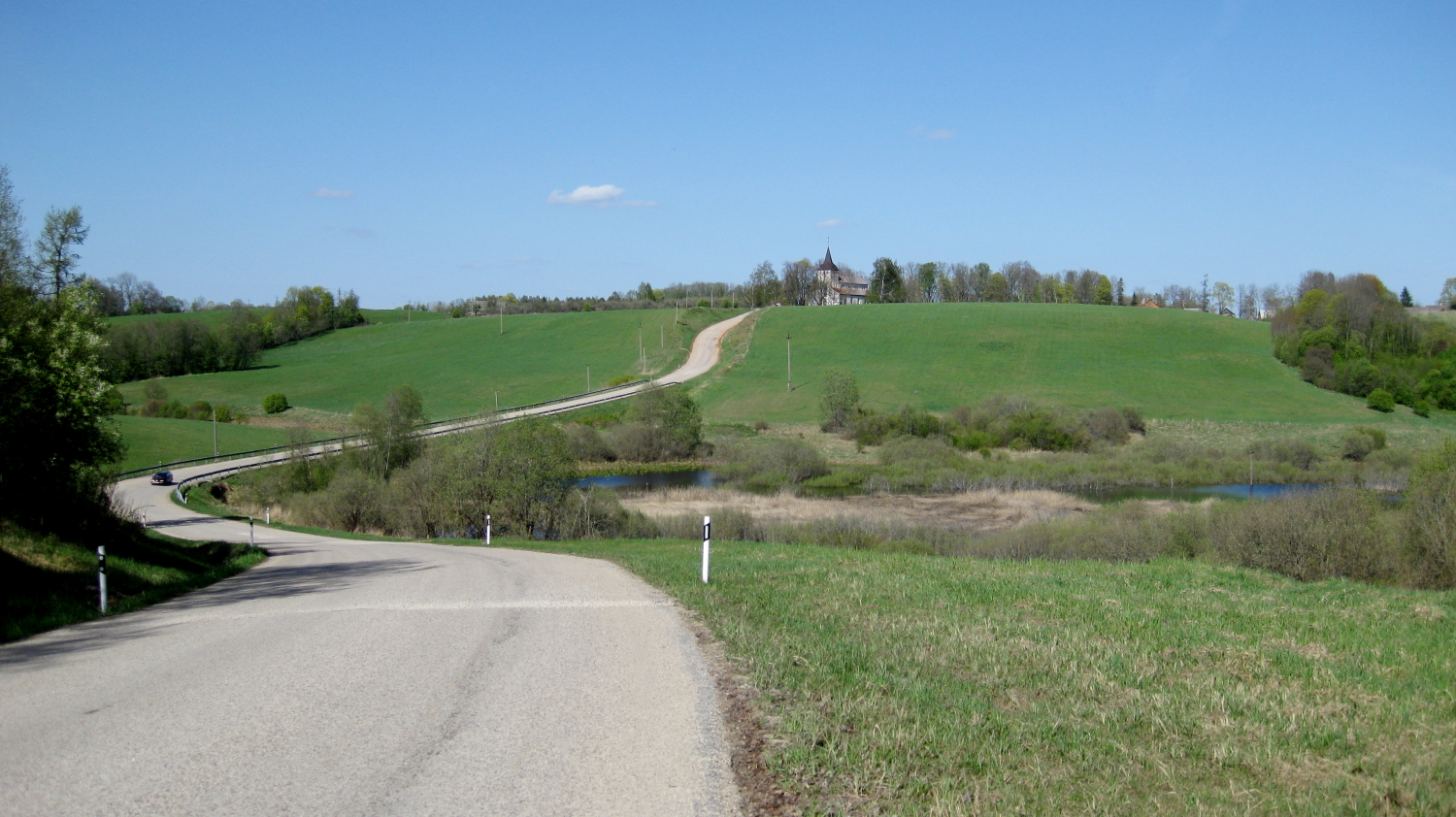
Landscape near Urvaste village.

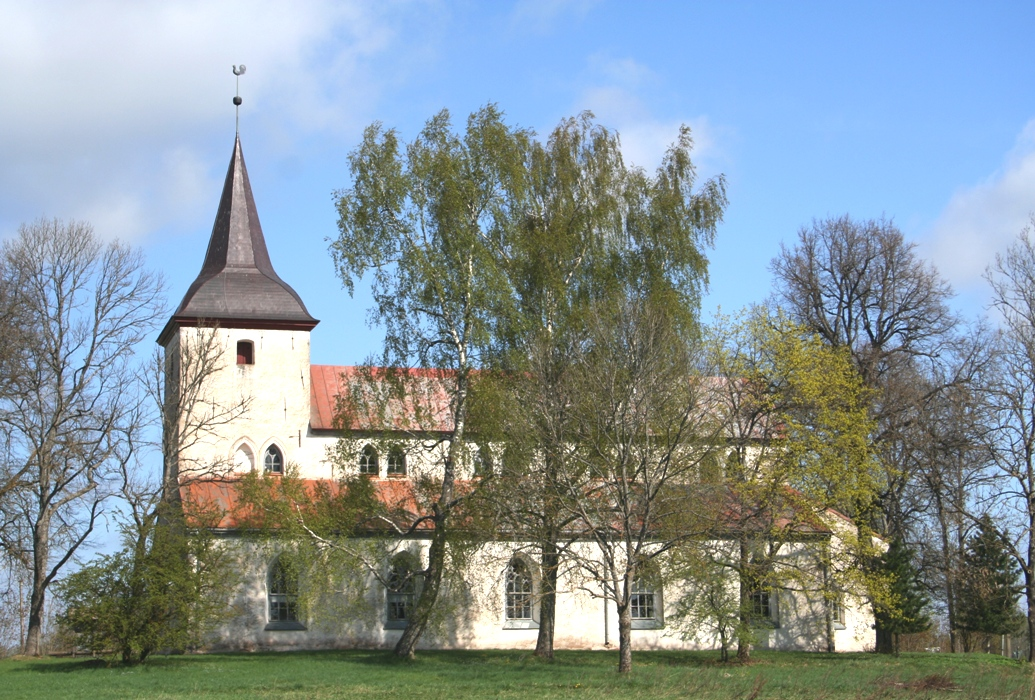
Urvaste church

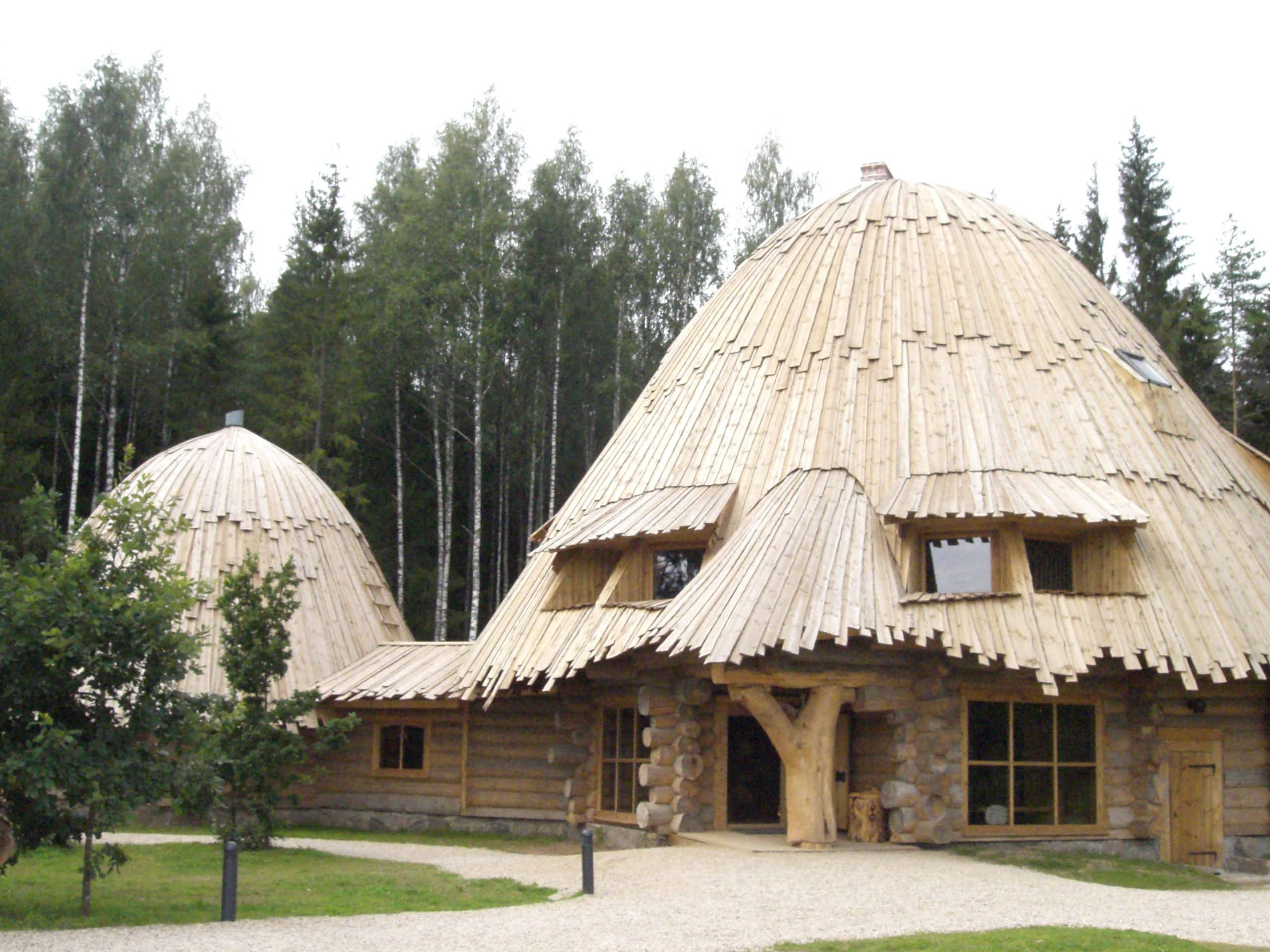
Pokuland, home of fictional characters Pokus, created by Edgar Valter.

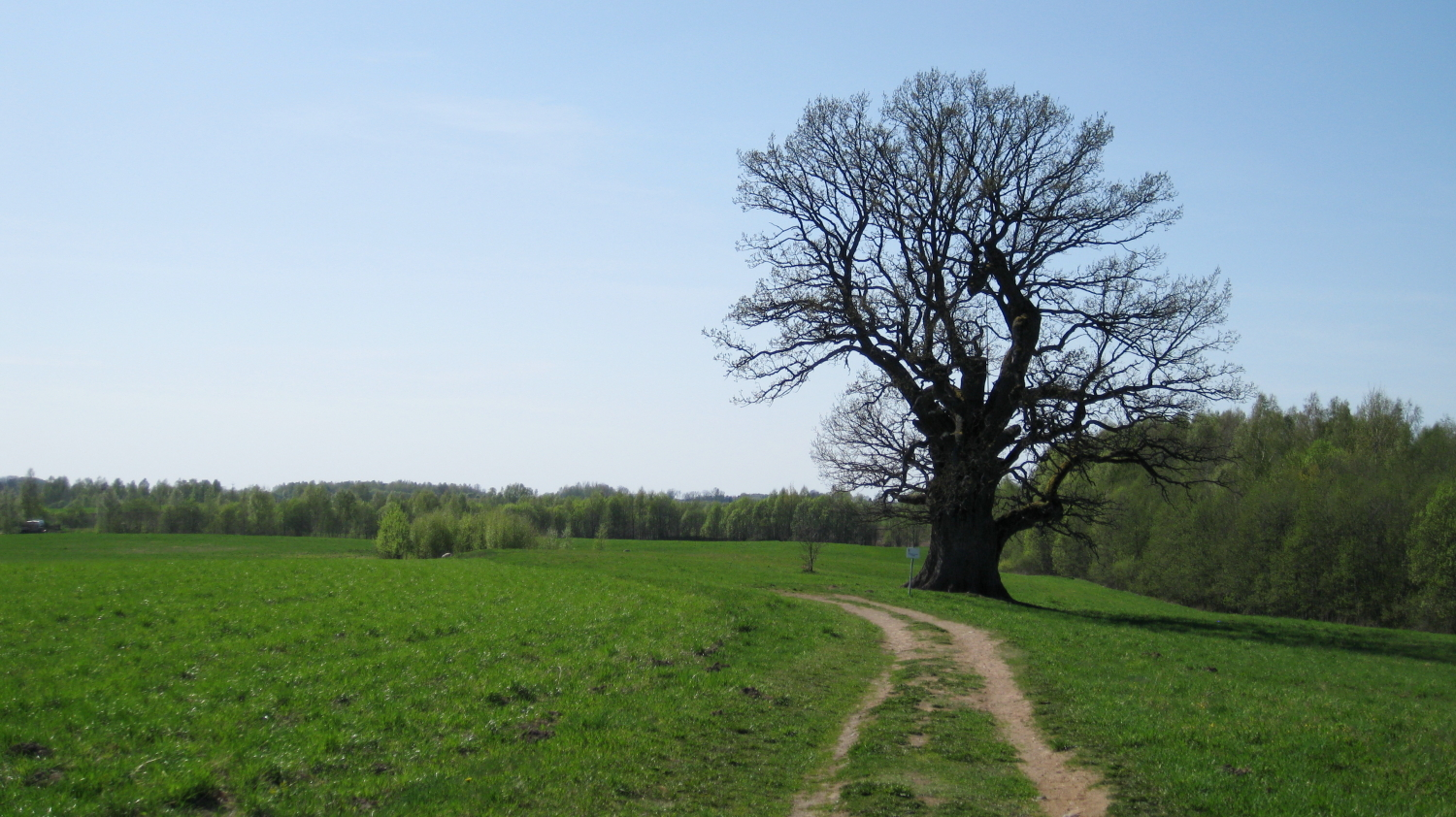
Tamme-Lauri oak

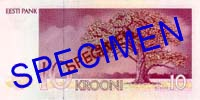
Tamme-Lauri oak, the thickest and oldest tree in Estonia, behind the Estonian 10 kroon banknote.
