= Kobela, Estonia =

Borough in Estonia

Kobela
- Small borough
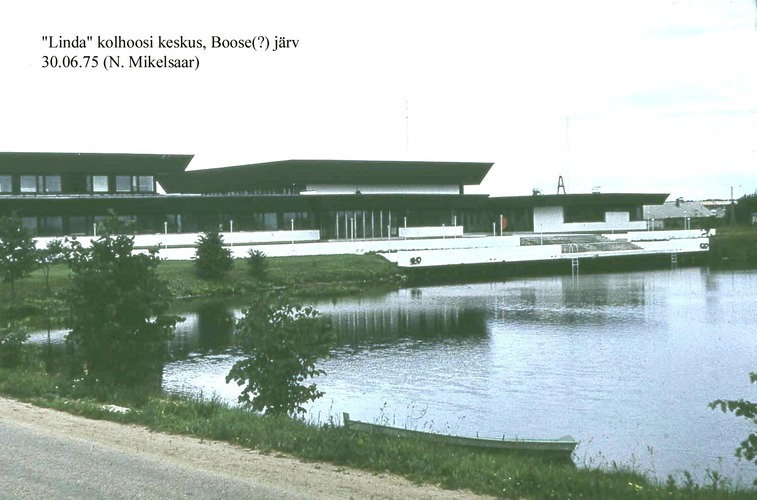
- Kobela

- Location in Estonia
- Coordinates: 57°50′28″N 26°28′27″E
- Country: Estonia
- County: Võru County
- Municipality: Antsla Parish
- First mentioned: 1405
- Small borough established: 1977

Population (2011 Census)
  - Total: 313

Kobela is a small borough (Estonian: alevik) in Võru County, in southeastern Estonia, located about 3 km (2 mi) northwest of the town of Antsla, near the Lake Vahtsõkivi. As of the 2011 census, the settlement's population was 313.

Kobela small borough was established in 1977 from Boose and Määrastu villages and parts of Lusti and Madise villages. The settlement that previously bore the name Kobela was renamed to Vana-Antsla.

Kobela is first mentioned in 1405 as Kowol. Later that area was divided into several villages and some cattle manors were established (Anne, Boose, Näsimetsa).

The nowadays settlement developed when the "Linda" kolkhoz' centre was built in the 1970s. The most notable building is the Linda civic centre, formerly used as the administrative and club building of the kolkhoz; architect Toomas Rein (1973).
