= Big Pehmejärv =

Lake in Estonia

- Suur Pehmejärv (Estonian)
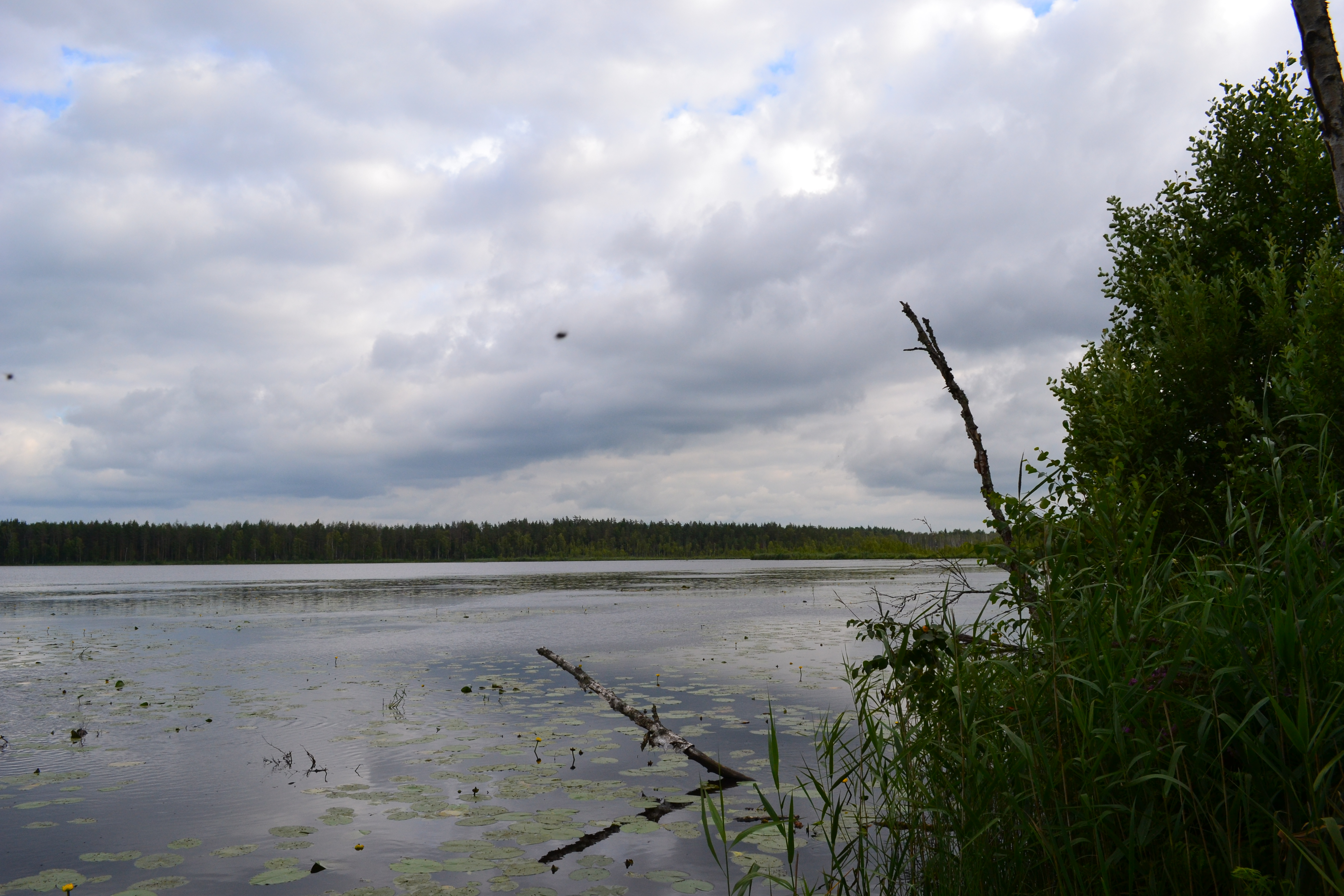

- Location within Estonia
- Coordinates: 57°42′N 26°34′E
- Basin countries: Estonia
- Max. length: 1,080 meters (3,540 ft)
- Surface area: 49.2 hectares (122 acres)
- Average depth: 1.7 meters (5 ft 7 in)
- Max. depth: 2.5 meters (8 ft 2 in)
- Shore length^{1}: 3,690 meters (12,110 ft)
- Surface elevation: 73.4 meters (241 ft)
- ^{1} Shore length is not a well-defined measure.

Big Pehmejärv (Estonian: Suur Pehmejärv, also simply Pehmejärv) is a lake in Estonia. It is located in the village of Ähijärve in Antsla Parish, Võru County.

== Physical description ==
The lake has an area of 49.2 hectares (122 acres). The lake has an average depth of 1.7 meters (5 ft 7 in) and a maximum depth of 2.5 meters (8 ft 2 in). It is 1,080 meters (3,540 ft) long, and its shoreline measures 3,690 meters (12,110 ft).

== Name ==
The lake was attested in historical sources as Pehemejerwe in 1638 and Pohame Siö in 1684. The name Suur Pehmejärv 'Big Pehmejärv' distinguishes the lake from neighboring Little Pehmejärv (Väikene Pehmejärv or Väike Pehmejärv), which is about one-tenth the size of the larger lake. The name Pehmejärv literally means 'soft lake'. If this is a continuation of the original name of the lake, the name may have been motivated either by the lake's marshy shores or the soft water (i.e., water with low mineral content) in the lake. The nearby hamlet of Kaudsi (or Kautsi) to the east in the village of Viirapalu was also formerly named after the lake; it was attested in historical sources as Poehama Kuella in 1627, and as Pehomekyllo and Pehama kyllo in 1638 (literally, 'soft village').

== See also ==
- List of lakes of Estonia
