= Lusti =

Lusti may refer to several places in Estonia:

- Lusti, Valga County, village in Valga Parish, Valga County
- Lusti, Võru County, village in Antsla Parish, Võru County
