= Contra (writer) =

Estonian writer (born 1974)

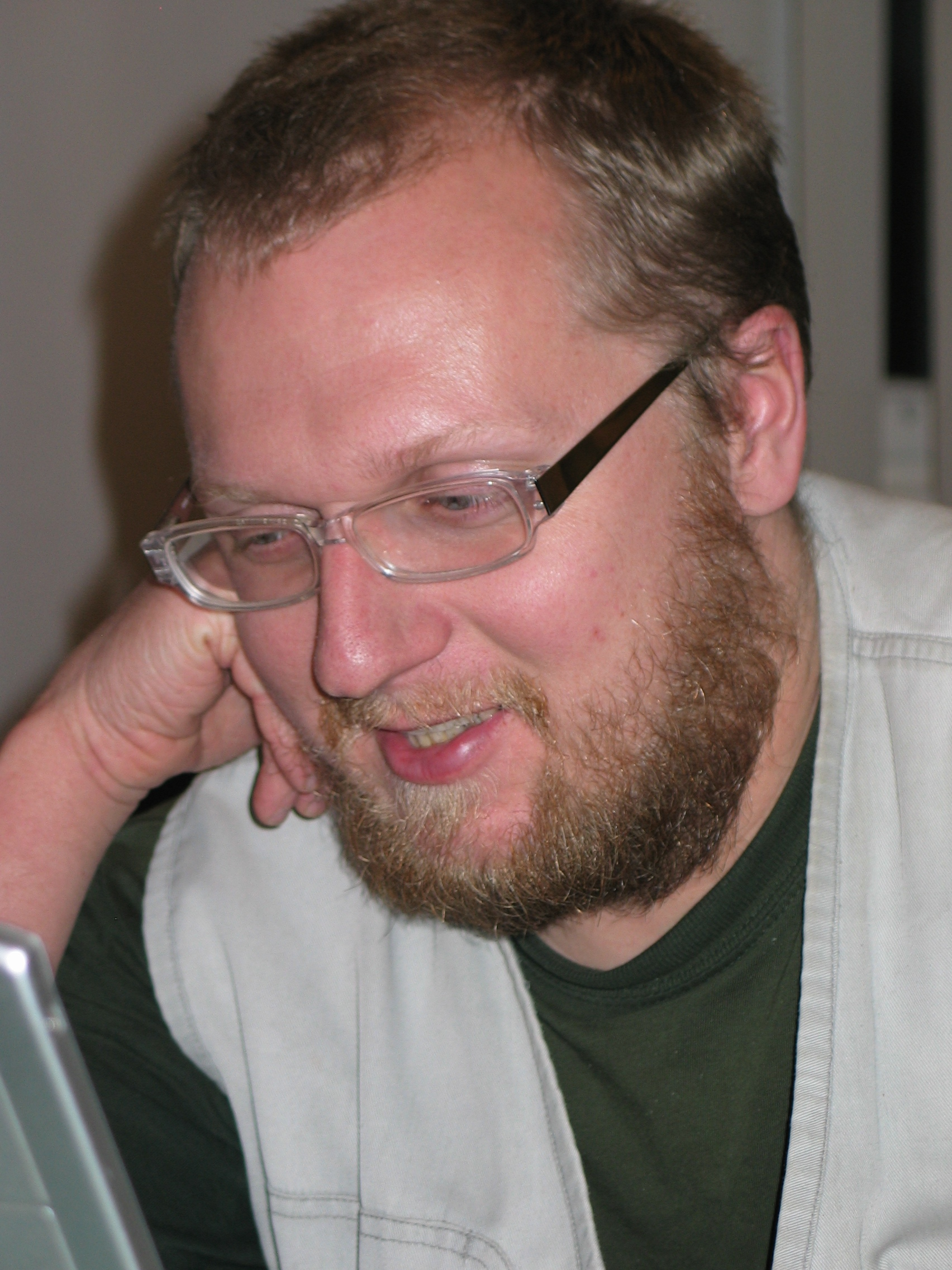
Contra (2006)

Contra (real name Margus Konnula; born 22 March 1974, in Urvaste, Võru County) is an Estonian poet and translator.

After 1994, he worked as a postman. From 1996 to 1999, he was the postmaster at Urvaste. After this job, he became a freelance writer and screenwriter. From 2004 to 2008, he was the editor of the local newspaper of the Urvaste Parish.

He has won numerous Estonian-related and also other country awards. For example, in 2017, he received the Eduards Veidenbaums Literary Award. In 2019, he received the Latvian Cross of Recognition (V class).

== Selected works ==
- 1995: poetry collection "Ohoh"
- 2001: poetry collection "Suusamütsi tutt" ('Ski Hat Bobble')
- 2019: poetry collection "Legoist"
