= Vana-Antsla =

Borough in Estonia

- Small borough
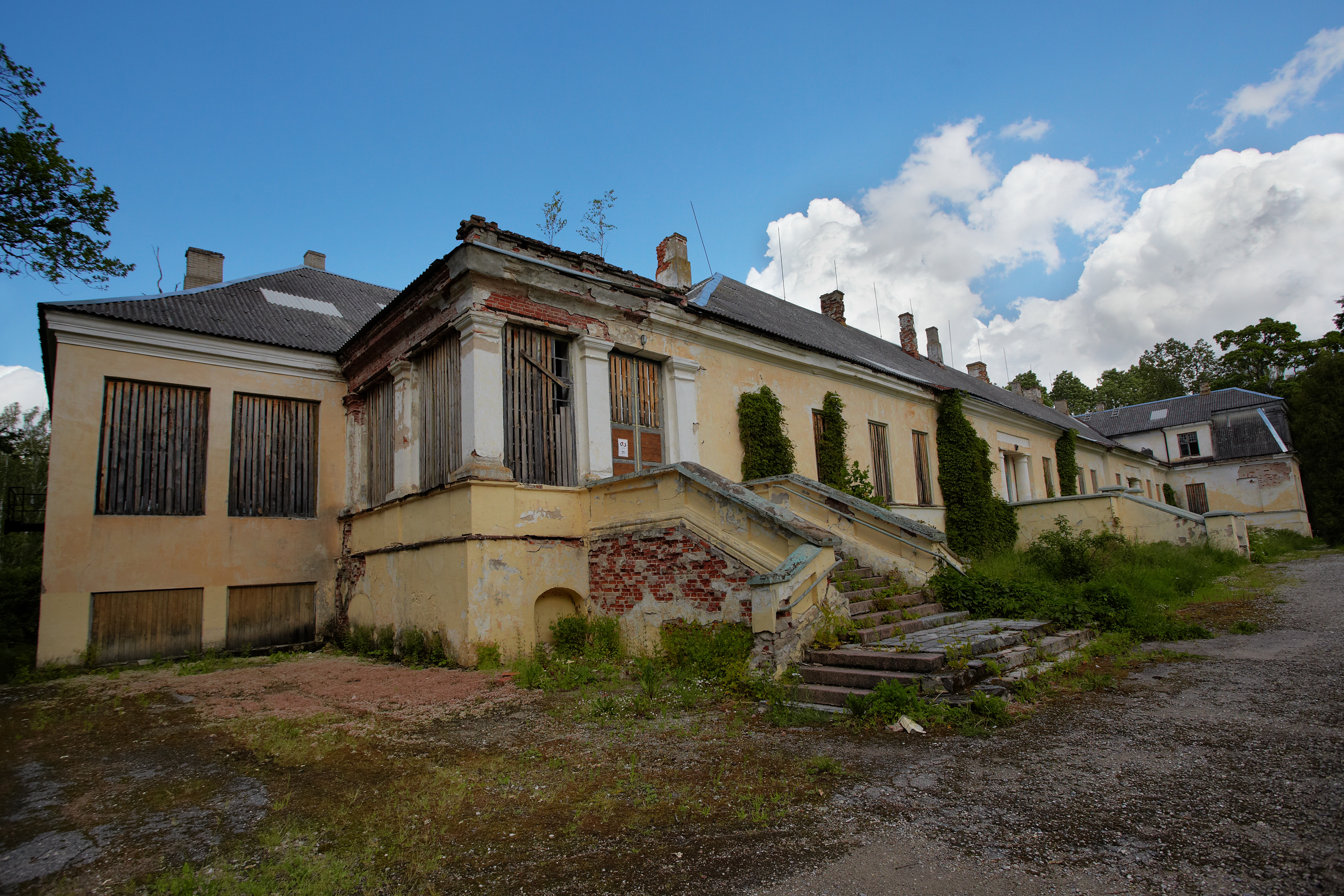
- The main building of the Vana-Antsla Manor.

- Location in Estonia
- Coordinates: 57°51′50″N 26°31′24″E
- Country: Estonia
- County: Võru County
- Municipality: Antsla Parish
- First mentioned: 1405

Population (2011 Census)
  - Total: 181

Vana-Antsla (German: Alt-Anzen) is a small borough (Estonian: alevik) in Võru County, in southeastern Estonia, located about 4 km (2 mi) north of the town of Antsla. As of the 2011 census, the settlement's population was 181.

The settlement is situated around the Vana-Antsla knight manor (Schloß Anzen), first mentioned in 1404. At first it was built as a vassal's stronghold and belonged to the Uexküll family. The stronghold was destroyed during the 17th century Polish-Swedish and Russo-Swedish wars. Swedish King Gustav II Adolf gave the manor to Åke Tott in 1625. In the end of the 17th century the Uue-Antsla (New Antsla) manor (Neu-Anzen) was detached from the manor, therefore the old one gained the name Vana-Antsla (Old Antsla). After the Great Northern War the manor was owned by the Löwenstern family and from 1883 by the Ungern-Sternbergs. After the Estonian independence in 1919 the manor was dispossessed like all the others around the country. The complex had since been used as an agricultural vocational school until it was closed in 2012. Most of the historical buildings have survived, including the single-storey main building from the 18th century.

Before 1977 the settlement was called Kobela, but was renamed to Vana-Antsla when a new small borough 4 km southwest was created and named Kobela.

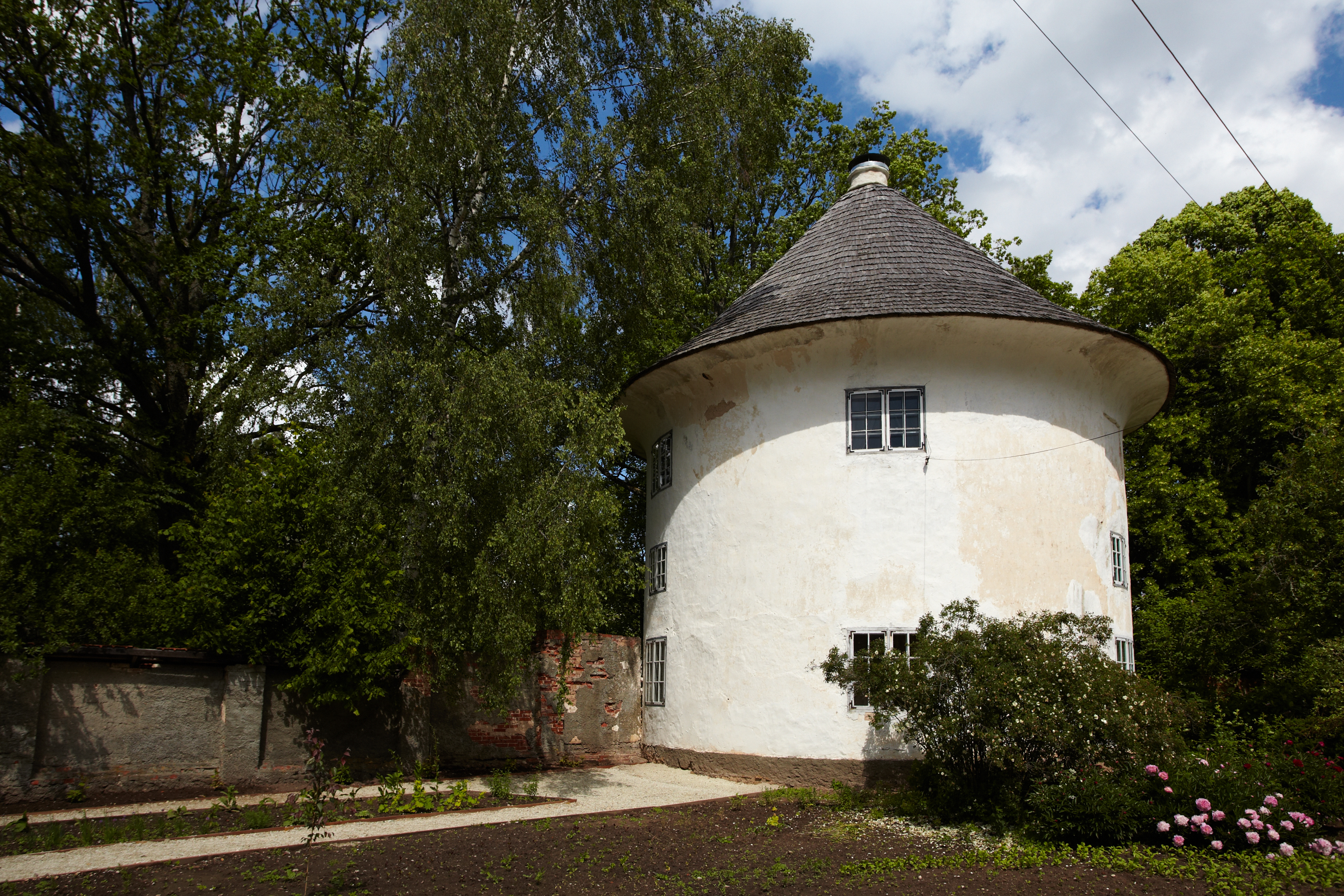
The gardener's house of the manor.
