= Uhtjärv =

Lake in Estonia

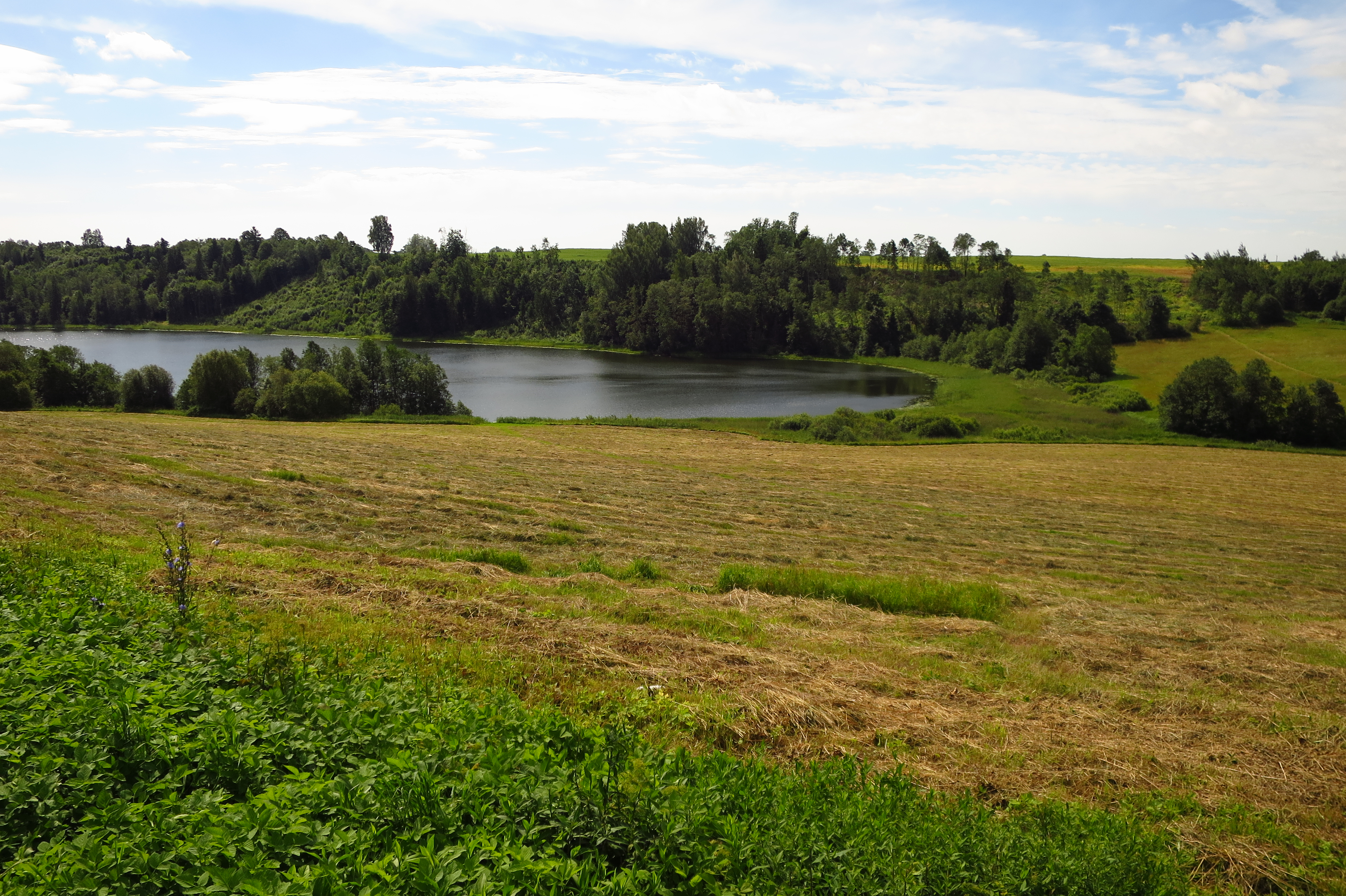

- Location within Estonia
- Coordinates: 57°54′N 26°34′E
- Basin countries: Estonia
- Max. length: 2,880 meters (9,450 ft)
- Surface area: 44.9 hectares (111 acres)
- Average depth: 8.9 meters (29 ft)
- Max. depth: 27.6 meters (91 ft)
- Water volume: 3,503,000 cubic meters (123,700,000 cu ft)
- Shore length^{1}: 6,480 meters (21,260 ft)
- Surface elevation: 91.1 meters (299 ft)
- ^{1} Shore length is not a well-defined measure.

Uhtjärv (also Uhtijärv) is a lake in Estonia. It is located in the village of Uhtjärve in Antsla Parish, Võru County.

== Physical description ==
The lake has an area of 44.9 hectares (111 acres). The lake has an average depth of 8.9 meters (29 ft) and a maximum depth of 27.6 meters (91 ft). It is 2,880 meters (9,450 ft) long, and its shoreline measures 6,480 meters (21,260 ft). It has a volume of 3,503,000 cubic meters (123,700,000 cu ft).

== See also ==
- List of lakes in Estonia
