= Vambola =

Male given name

- Gender: Male
- Language: Estonian
- Name day: 22 December

Origin
- Origin: From the title character of Andres Saal's 1889 short story Vambola
- Region of origin: Estonia

Other names
- Nickname: Vambo
- Related names: Vambo

Vambola is an Estonian masculine given name.

The name is derived from the title character of Estonian author Andres Saal's 1889 short story Vambola; part of a trilogy, along with Aita (1891) and Leili (1892–1893), which deal with the ancient struggle for freedom of the Estonians and Livonians between the 12th and 13th-centuries. The name was possibly derived by Saal from the Varbola Stronghold; a 10th through 12th-century circular rampart fortress and trading centre built in present-day Rapla County, or modeled on the name Wamba, the chief of forces, in Friedrich Reinhold Kreutzwald's 1885 poem Lembitu. Recorded usages of the name among the populace can be found in Tartu church registers as early as 1905.

As of 1 January 2021, Vambola was the 350th most popular male name in Estonia. People with the given name Vambola range in age from 85 plus years at the eldest, to ten to fourteen at the youngest, with the median age of 66. The name is most commonly found in Põlva County, where there 6.06 per 10,000 male inhabitants of the county bear the name.

Individuals bearing the name Vambola include:

- Vambola Helm (1934–2020), motorcycle racer and coach
- Vambola Krigul (born 1981), percussionist, chamber musician and singer
- Vambola Kurg (1898–1981), actor
- Vambola Laanmäe (1916–2005), animal husbandry scientist and researcher
- Vambola Maavara (1928–1999), entomologist and travel writer
- Vambola Põder (1929–1993), politician
- Vambola Raudsepp (born 1941), economist
