= Kaika =

Kaika may refer to:

- Emperor Kaika of Japan
- Kaika (yōkai), a phenomenon of mysterious flames of unknown cause.
- Kaika, Tibet, village in Tibet
- Kaika, Estonia, village in Antsla Parish, Võru County, Estonia
- Kāinga, traditional Māori villages, spelt kaika in southern dialects of Māori
