= Lake Vahtsõkivi =

Lake in Estonia

- Vahtsõkivi järv (Estonian)
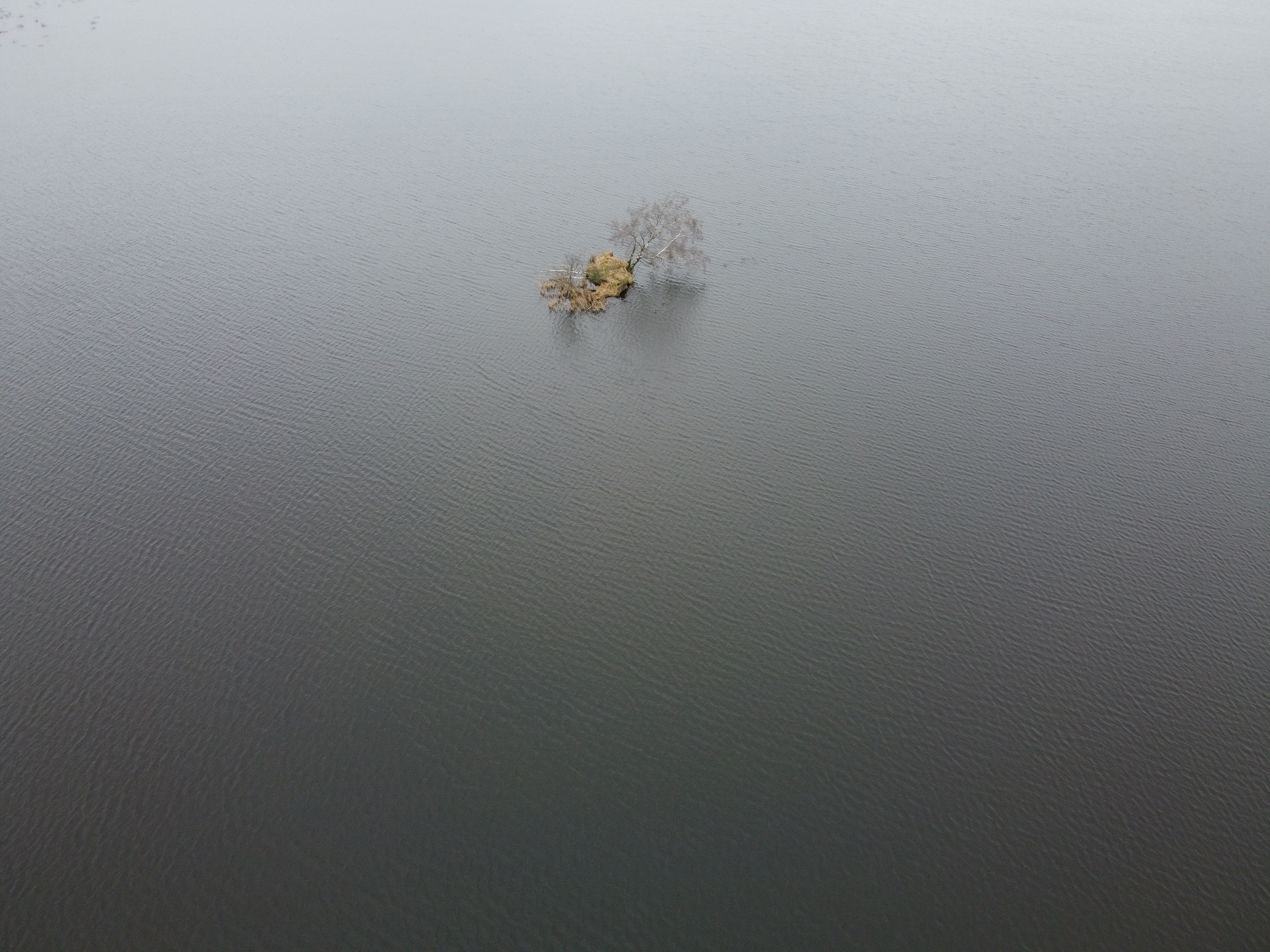

- Location within Estonia
- Location: Antsla Parish, Võru County, Estonia
- Coordinates: 57.8497°N 26.4708°E
- Basin countries: Estonia
- Surface area: 69.6 hectares (172 acres)
- Average depth: 2 metres (6 ft 7 in)
- Max. depth: 4.6 metres (15 ft)

Lake Vahtsõkivi (Estonian: Vahtsõkivi järv, also known as Vastsekivi järv or Aladi 4) is a lake in Estonia. It is located in the village of Antsu in Antsla Parish, Valga County.

== Physical description ==
The lake has an area of 67.2 hectares (166 acres), and it has four islands with a combined area of 0.1 hectares (0.25 acres). The lake has an average depth of 1.2 meters (3 ft 11 in) and a maximum depth of 4.6 meters (15 ft). It is 1,620 meters (5,310 ft) long, and its shoreline measures 6,380 meters (20,930 ft). It has a volume of 907,000 cubic meters (32,000,000 cu ft).

== See also ==
- List of lakes of Estonia
