= Koigu =

Koigu may refer to several places in Estonia:

- Koigu, Valga County, village in Estonia
- Koigu, Võru County, village in Estonia
