= Soome =

Soome may refer to:

- Soome, Estonia, a village
- The name for Finland in the Estonian language
