= Jõepera =

Jõepera may refer to several places in Estonia:

- Jõepera, Põlva County, village in Räpina Parish, Põlva County
- Jõepera, Võru County, village in Antsla Parish, Võru County
