= Palumõisa =

Former village in Estonia

- Former village
- Location within Estonia
- Coordinates: 57°52′26″N 26°36′57″E
- Country: Estonia
- County: Võru County
- Village abolished: 1977
- Time zone: UTC+2 (EET)
  - Summer (DST): UTC+3 (EEST)

Palumõisa (also known as Kirsi) was a village in present day Võru County. Today, the areas of the village remain in the villages of Lümatu and Vaabina. The village was abolished in 1977.
