= Litsmetsa =

Village in Estonia

- Location within Estonia
- Coordinates: 57°45′30″N 26°37′39″E
- Country: Estonia
- County: Võru County
- Time zone: UTC+2 (EET)

Litsmetsa (Võro: Litsmõtsa) is a settlement in Antsla Parish, Võru County in southeastern Estonia.

Elias Lönnrot, author of the Finnish epic Kalevala, stayed in Litsmetsa for six days in September 1844.
