= Säre =

Village in Estonia

- Village
- Location in Estonia
- Coordinates: 57°49′45″N 26°34′30″E
- Country: Estonia
- County: Võru County
- Municipality: Antsla Parish

Säre is a village in Antsla Parish, Võru County in southeastern Estonia.
