= Marie Heiberg =

Estonian poet

Marie Heiberg in 1911

Marie Heiberg (10 September 1890 – 15 February 1942) was an Estonian poet. When she was only about 15 years old she wrote her first poems, which were acclaimed for their youthful freshness. Heiberg spent the last twenty years of her life in a mental institution. There is a memorial to her in Urvaste.

== Biography ==
Heiberg was born on the Siimu farm near Lake Uhtjärv in southern Estonia in September 1890 (in August 1890 new style because Estonia did not change from the Julian calendar to the Gregorian calendar until 1917). Heiberg was brought up in a poor family environment. After attending local schools in the small village of Urvaste and the larger borough of Sangaste in 1905, Heiberg began to write poetry when she was sixteen.

Her first poems appeared in an anthology published by the Estonian writer and critic Friedebert Tuglas. She and Tuglas exchanged letters for the next twelve years. When she was 16, she went to Tartu where she earned a living performing odd jobs and working as a freelance journalist. In 1906, she published her first collection of poems, Mure-lapse laulud (Songs of a Problem Child), followed in 1913 by her second and last collection, Luule (Poems). In 1910, she published a short story, Elukevade (Springtime of Life). The youthful freshness of Mure-lapse laulud was acclaimed whereas Luule was considered more sophisticated but less youthful. Her stories are not comparable with her talented approach to poetry with its recurrent themes of loneliness, sadness, and spiritual darkness. During all this time she corresponded with Tuglas despite him being in exile in various countries around Europe. He returned to Estonia in 1917.

Around 1919, Heiberg began to suffer from a mental illness, possibly schizophrenia, and spent some time in Tallinn's mental hospital. She returned home, but her condition deteriorated with the result that she spent the last 20 years of her life in a psychiatric institution until she died in February 1942.

== Legacy ==
In 2010 a book, Üks naine kurbade silmadega, was published about Heiberg, her correspondence and some of her poetry. A memorial to Marie Heiberg which includes a bust of her has been erected beside the church in Urvaste. Heiberg's words inspired Tõnu Kõrvits and Maarja Kangro to write an operetta Mu luiged, mu mõtted (My Swans, My Thoughts). The libretto premiered in 2006 and was performed at the Von Krahl Theatre in Tallinn and subsequently at the Tallinn City Theatre.

== Works ==
- 1906: Mure-lapse laulud (poetry)
- 1910: Elukevade (short stories)
- 1913: Luule (poetry)
- 1988: Käisin üksi tähte valgel (selected poetry)
