= Haabsaare =

Village in Estonia

- Location within Estonia
- Coordinates: 57°45′49″N 26°30′31″E
- Country: Estonia
- County: Võru County
- Time zone: UTC+2 (EET)

Haabsaare is a village in Antsla Parish, Võru County in southeastern Estonia.
