= Luhametsa =

Village in Estonia

Luhametsa Luhamõtsa (in Võro)
- Village
- Location in Estonia
- Coordinates: 57°46′24″N 26°43′40″E
- Country: Estonia
- County: Võru County
- Municipality: Antsla Parish

Luhametsa (Võro: Luhamõtsa) is a village in Antsla Parish, Võru County in southeastern Estonia.
