= Kraavi =

Village in Estonia

- Village
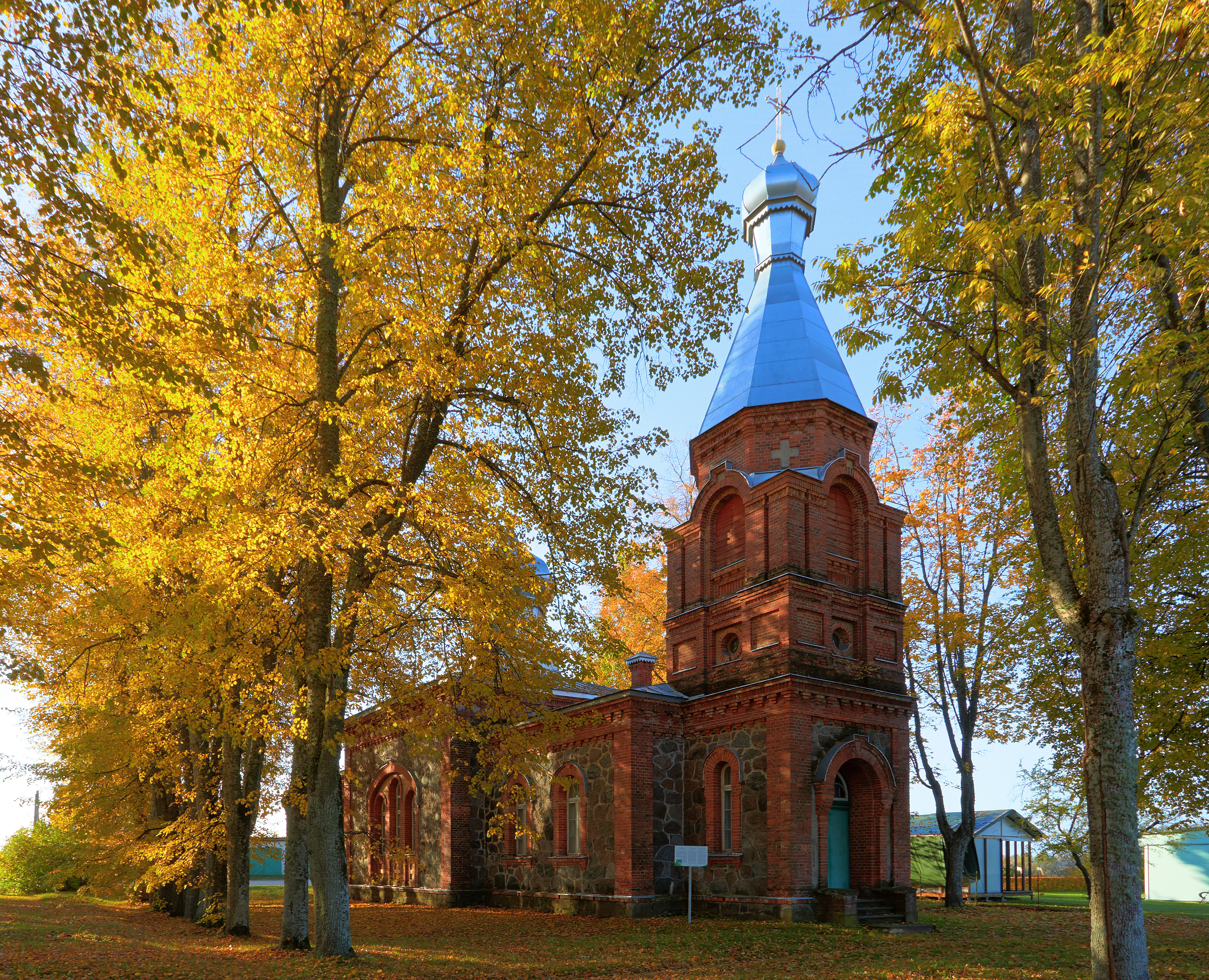
- Antsla-Kraavi Prophet Elijah Church

- Location in Estonia
- Coordinates: 57°50′39″N 26°33′21″E
- Country: Estonia
- County: Võru County
- Municipality: Antsla Parish

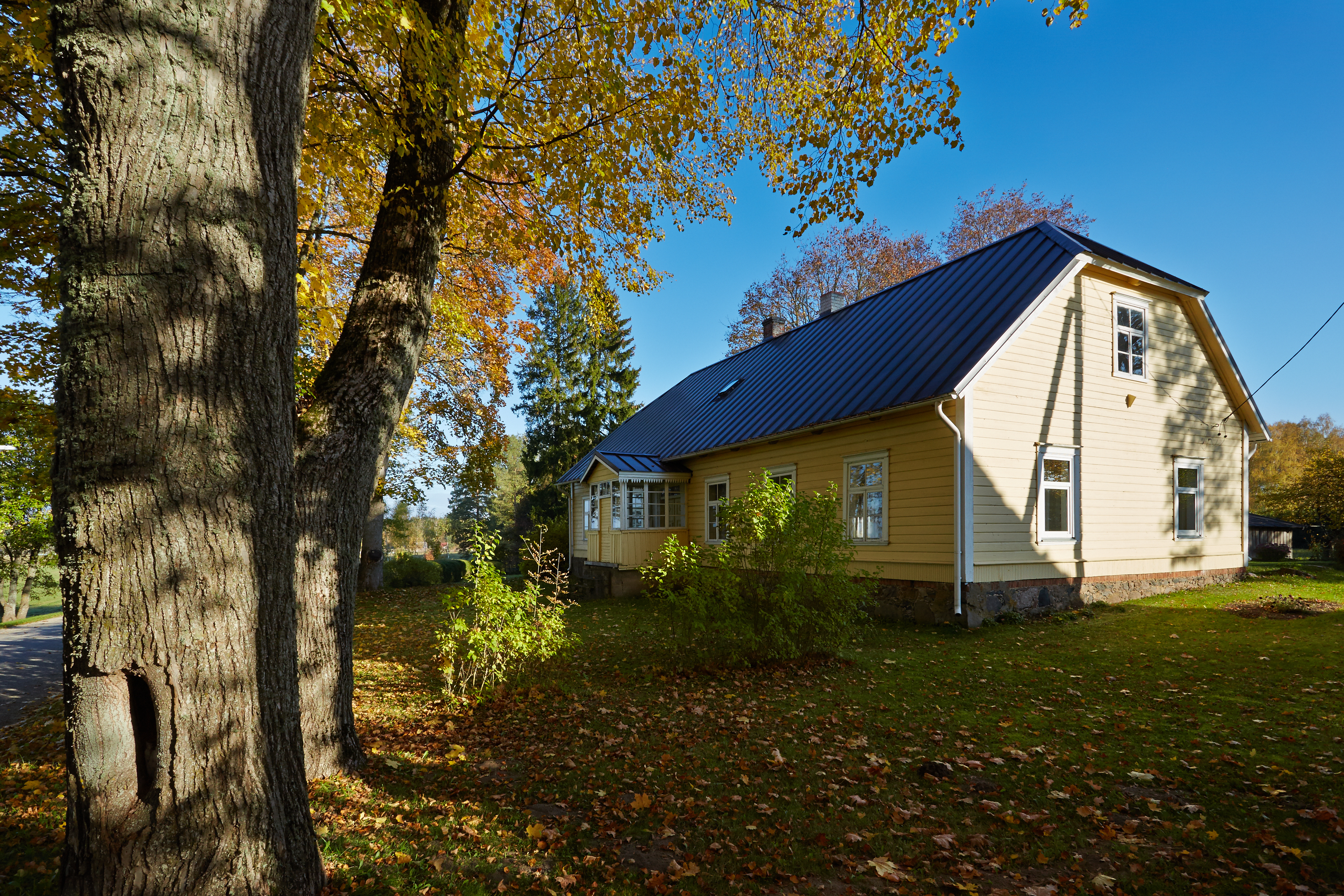
The old Kraavi schoolhouse, now a national historical monument

Kraavi is a village in Antsla Parish, Võru County in southeastern Estonia.
