= Lustimõisa =

Village in Estonia

- Village
- Location in Estonia
- Coordinates: 57°46′46″N 26°29′07″E
- Country: Estonia
- County: Võru County
- Municipality: Antsla Parish

Lustimõisa is a village in Antsla Parish, Võru County in southeastern Estonia.

Before 2024, the village was part of Lusti in Valga Parish, Valga County. On 1 January 2024, Lustimõisa was formed from parts of Lusti.
