= Kikkaoja =

Village in Estonia

- Location within Estonia
- Coordinates: 57°43′0″N 26°41′20″E
- Country: Estonia
- County: Võru County
- Time zone: UTC+2 (EET)

Kikkaoja is a village in Antsla Parish, Võru County in southeastern Estonia.
