= Mähkli =

Village in Estonia

- Location within Estonia
- Coordinates: 57°43′51″N 26°28′17″E
- Country: Estonia
- County: Võru County
- Time zone: UTC+2 (EET)

Mähkli is a settlement in Antsla Parish, Võru County in southeastern Estonia. As of the 2021 census, the population was 32.
