= Savilöövi =

Village in Estonia

- Location within Estonia
- Coordinates: 57°45′10″N 26°40′51″E
- Country: Estonia
- County: Võru County
- Time zone: UTC+2 (EET)

Savilöövi is a settlement in Antsla Parish, Võru County in southeastern Estonia.
