= Kollino =

Village in Estonia

- Village
- Location in Estonia
- Coordinates: 57°49′00″N 26°33′24″E
- Country: Estonia
- County: Võru County
- Municipality: Antsla Parish

Kollino is a village in Antsla Parish, Võru County in southeastern Estonia.
