= Roosiku =

Village in Estonia

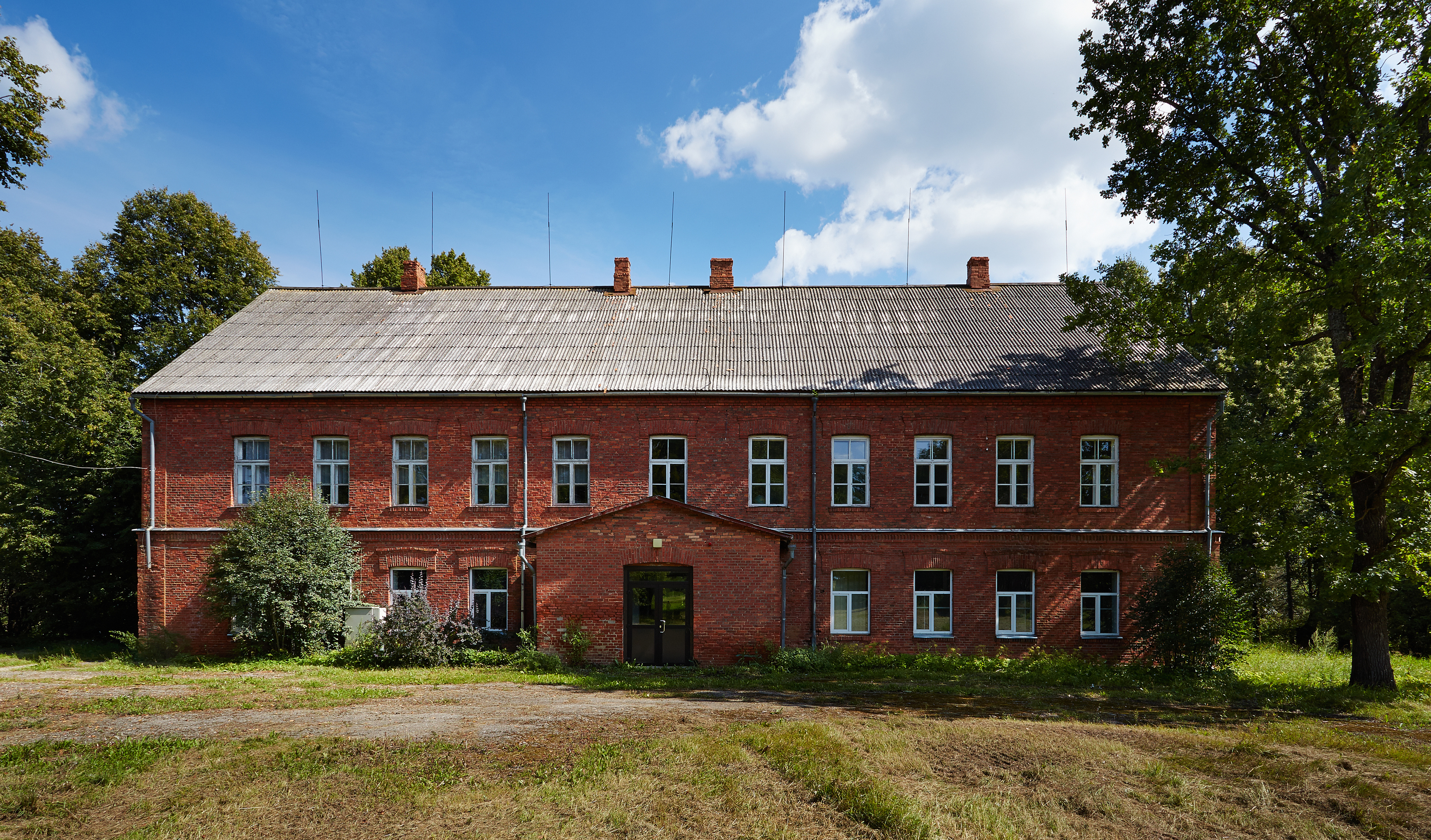
- The former Lepistu primary school, closed in 2008

- Location within Estonia
- Coordinates: 57°44′28″N 26°42′34″E
- Country: Estonia
- County: Võru County
- Time zone: UTC+2 (EET)

Roosiku is a settlement in Antsla Parish, Võru County in southeastern Estonia.
