= Lusti, Valga County =

Village in Estonia

- Village
- Location within Estonia
- Coordinates: 57.7775°N 26.4495°E
- Country: Estonia
- County: Valga County
- Parish: Valga Parish
- Time zone: UTC+2 (EET)
  - Summer (DST): UTC+3 (EEST)

Lusti is a village in Valga Parish, Valga County in Estonia.

On 1 January 2024, Lustimõisa was formed from the eastern parts of the village, which were transferred to Antsla Parish, Võru County.
