= Tsooru =

Village in Estonia

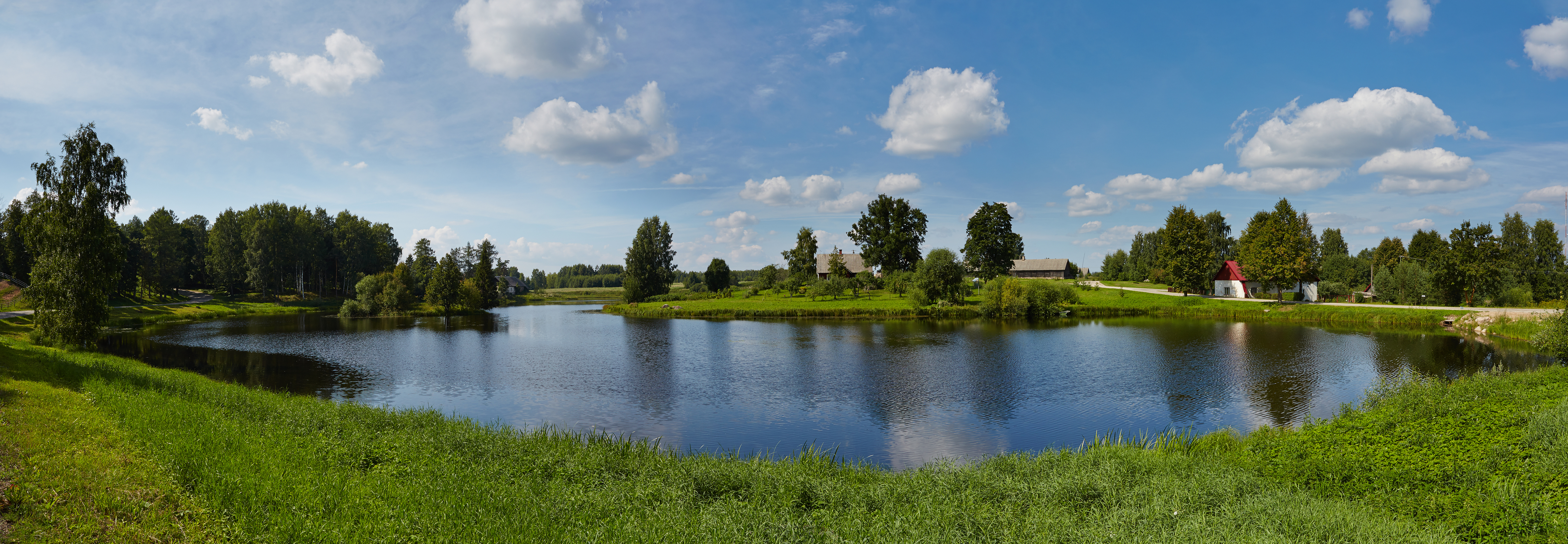
- Lake Tsooru

- Location within Estonia
- Coordinates: 57°44′25″N 26°39′20″E
- Country: Estonia
- County: Võru County
- Time zone: UTC+2 (EET)

Tsooru is a settlement in Antsla Parish, Võru County in southeastern Estonia.

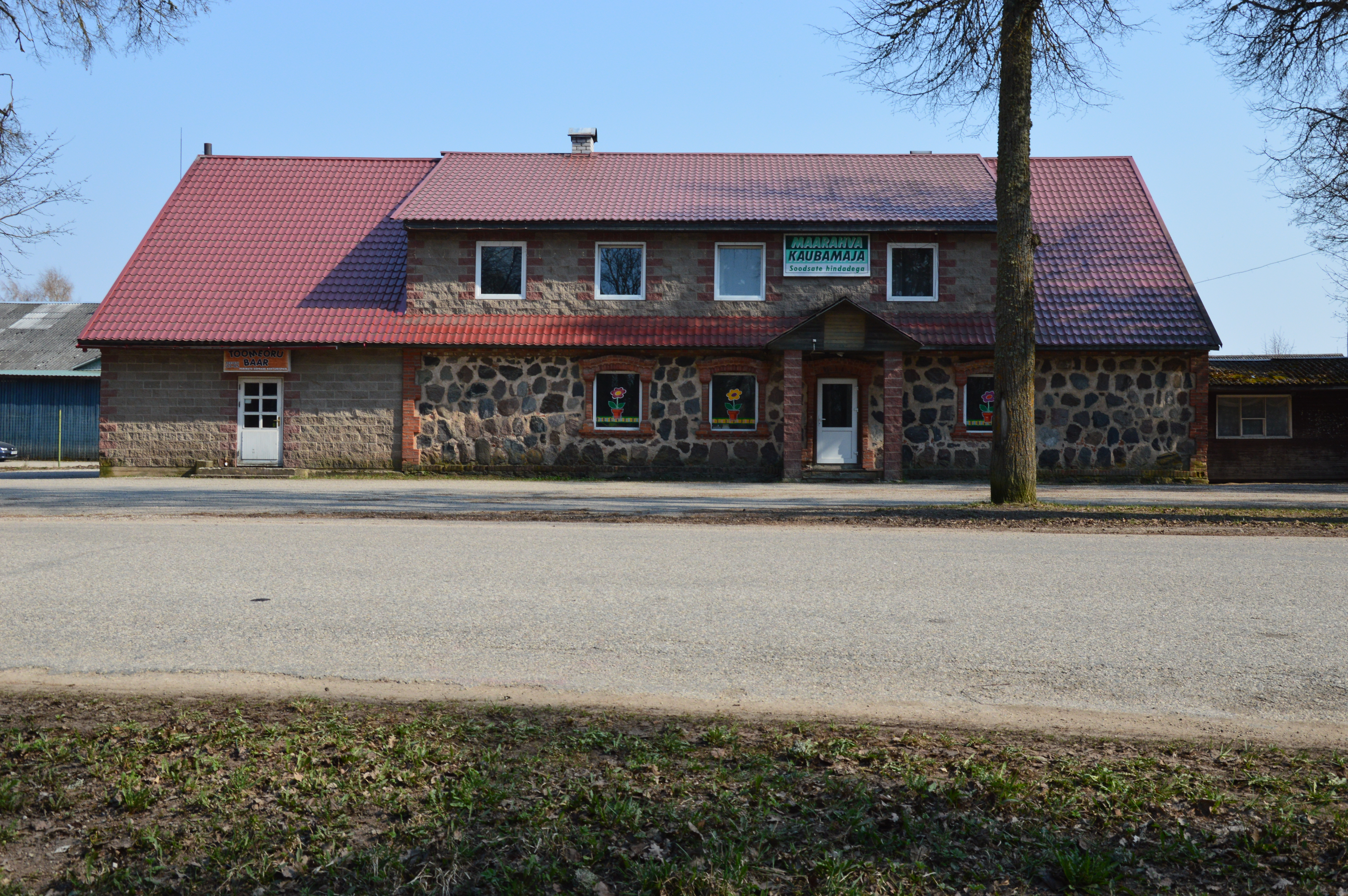
Rural store

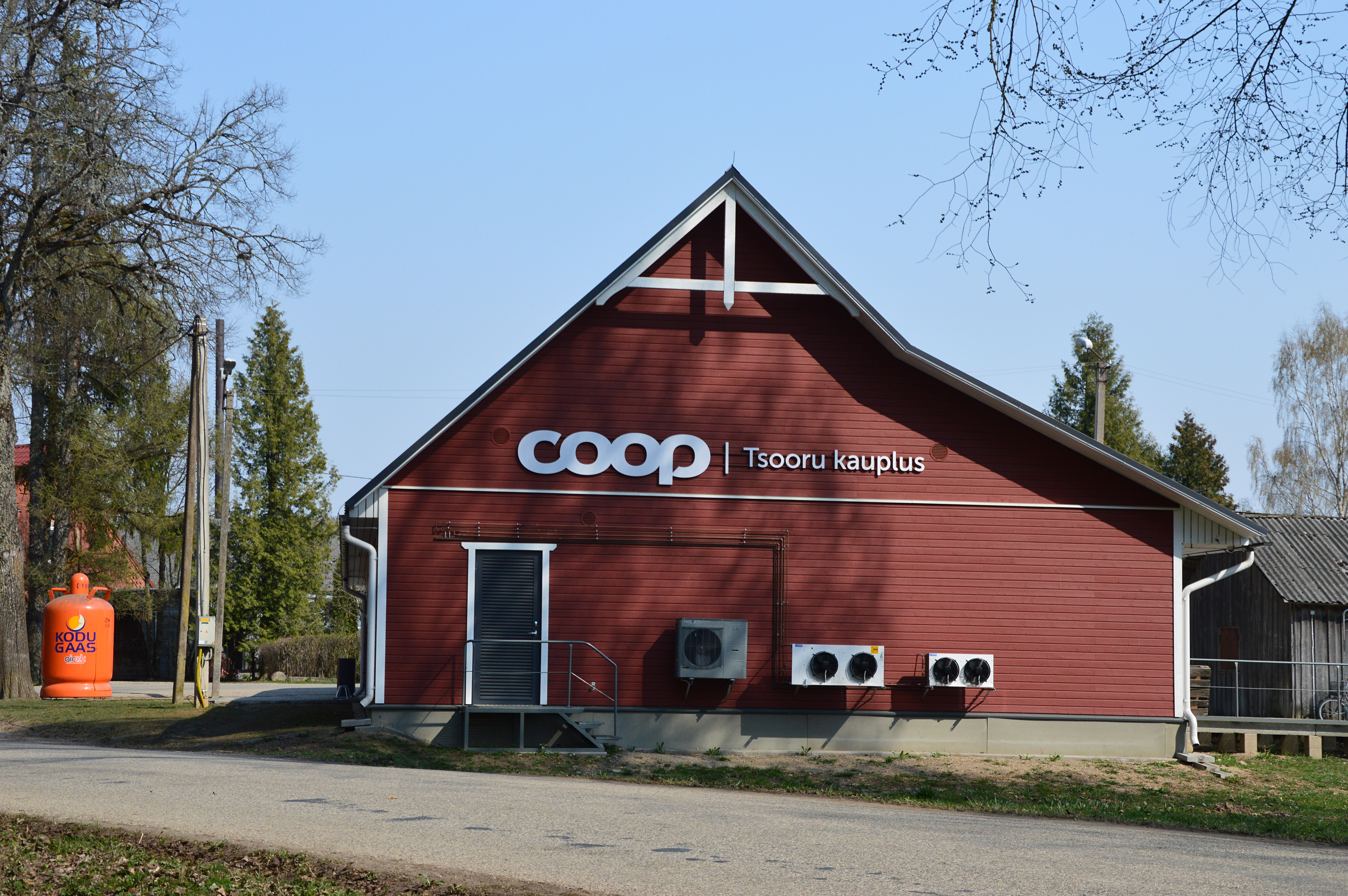
Tsooru Co-op

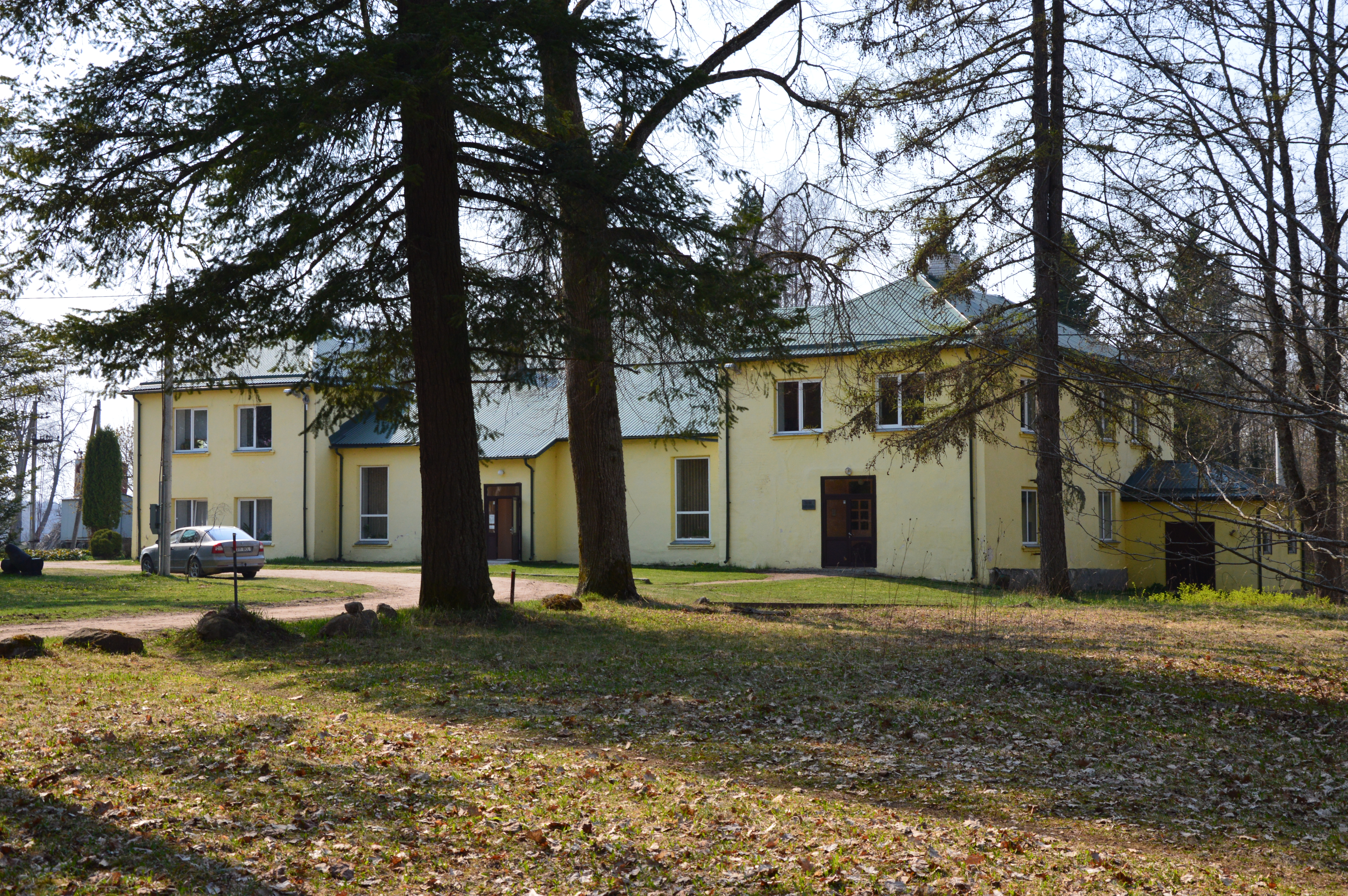
Tsooru library

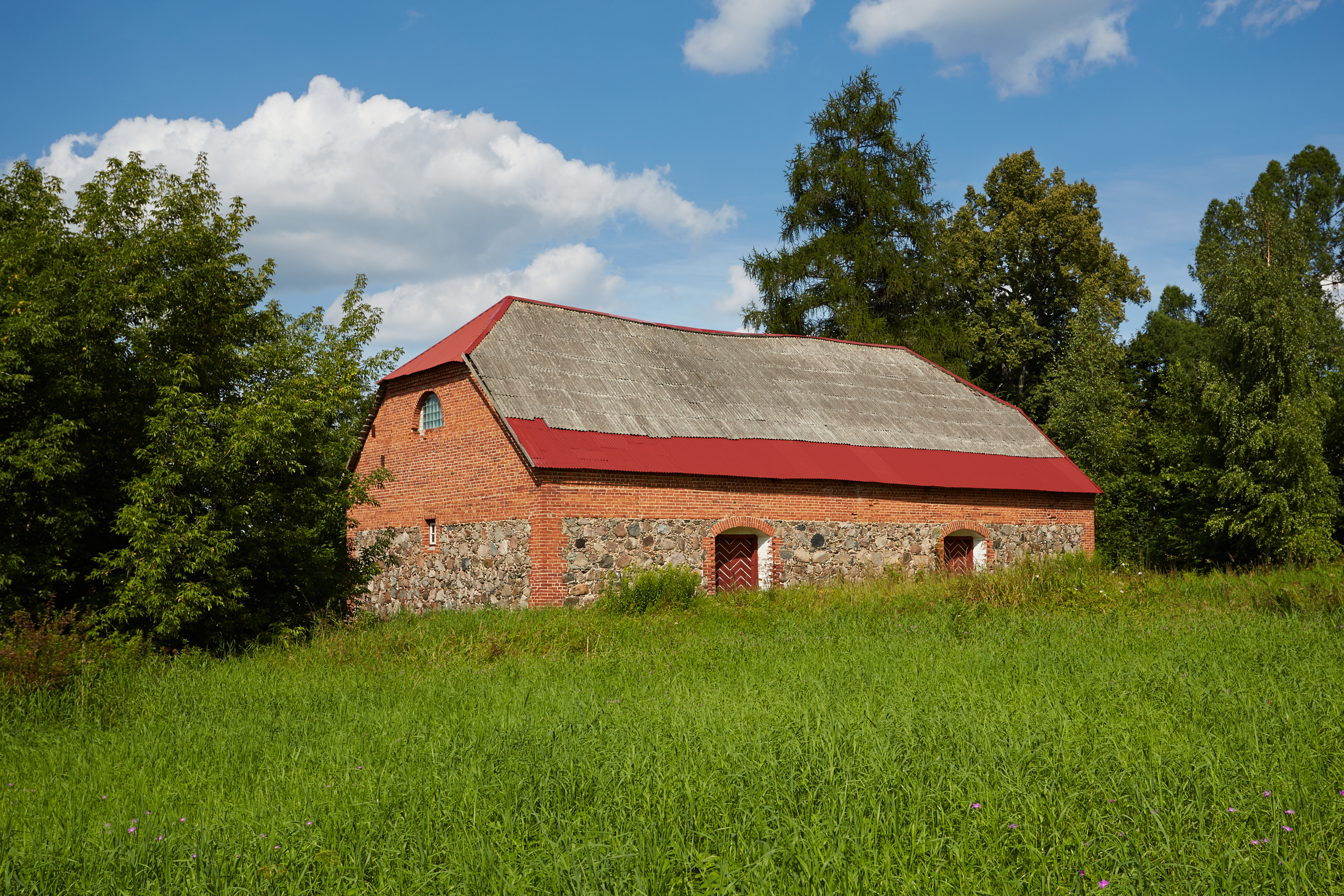
Tsooru manor granary

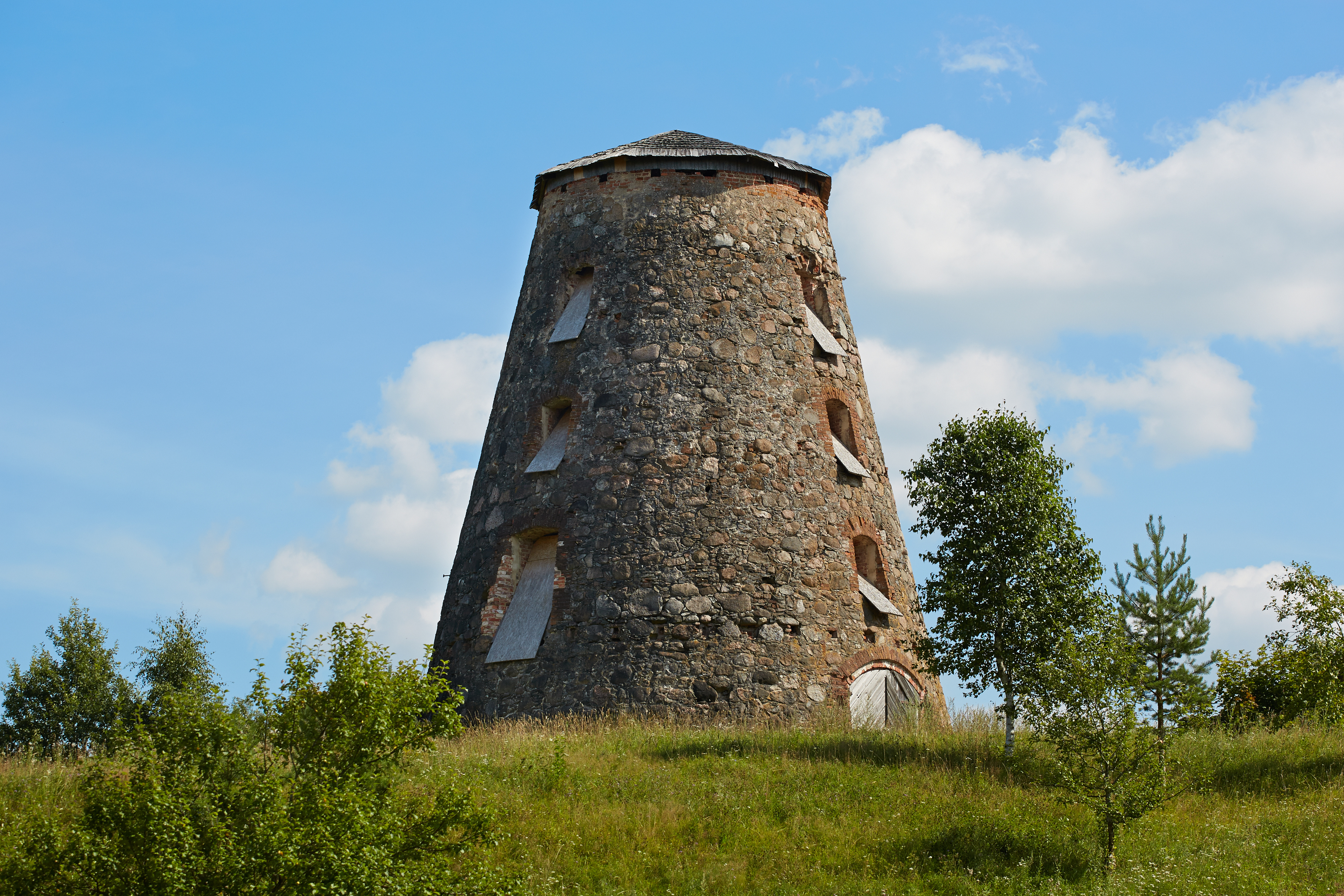
Tsooru manor windmill
