= Piisi =

Village in Estonia

- Village
- Location in Estonia
- Coordinates: 57°46′32″N 26°45′58″E
- Country: Estonia
- County: Võru County
- Municipality: Antsla Parish

Piisi is a village in Antsla Parish, Võru County in southeastern Estonia.
