= Kuldre =

Village in Estonia

Kuldre Kuldri (in Võro)
- Village
- Location in Estonia
- Coordinates: 57°53′34″N 26°29′47″E
- Country: Estonia
- County: Võru County
- Municipality: Antsla Parish

Population (26.05.2004)
  - Total: 202

Kuldre (Võro: Kuldri) is a village in Võru County, in Antsla Parish, in southeastern Estonia. It was the administrative centre of Urvaste Parish. Kuldre has a population of 202 (as of 26 May 2004).

== Gallery ==
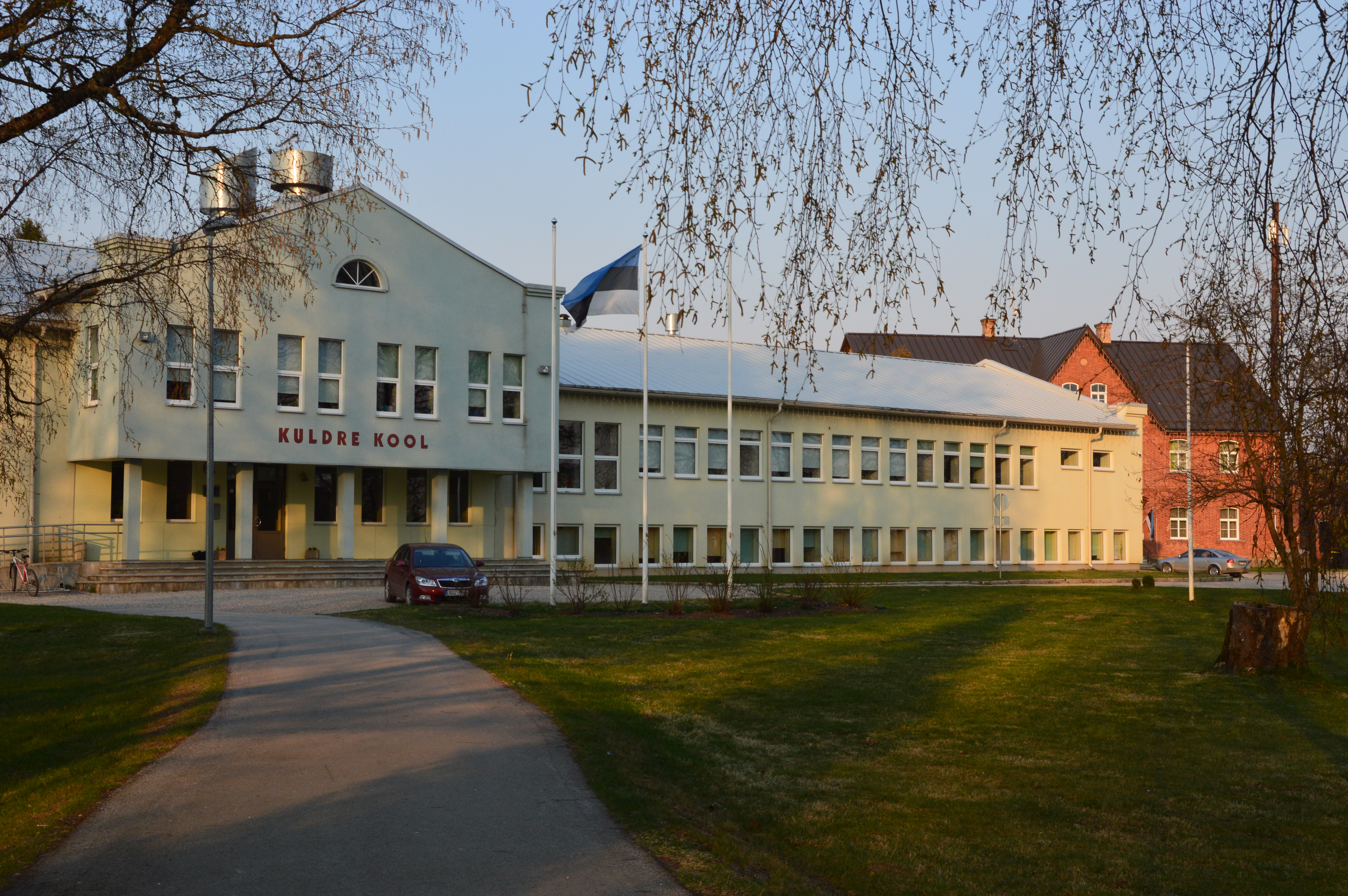

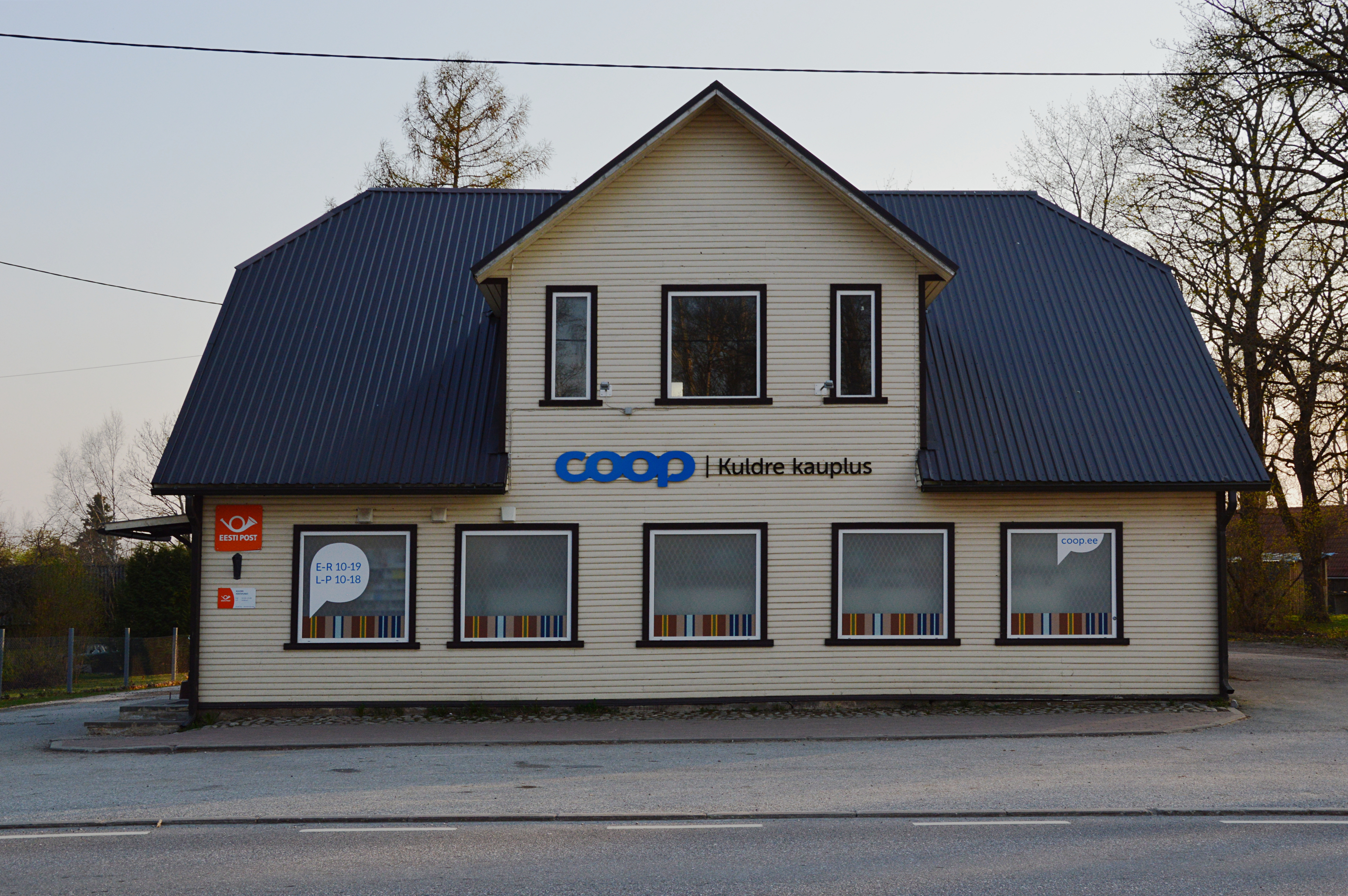
