= Taberlaane =

Village in Estonia

Taberlaane Tabõrlaanõ (in Võro)
- Village
- Location in Estonia
- Coordinates: 57°50′55″N 26°30′57″E
- Country: Estonia
- County: Võru County
- Municipality: Antsla Parish

Taberlaane (Võro: Tabõrlaanõ) is a village in Antsla Parish, Võru County in southeastern Estonia. It has a population of 96.
