= Toku, Estonia =

Village in Estonia

Toku
- Village
- Location in Estonia
- Coordinates: 57°52′57″N 26°26′10″E
- Country: Estonia
- County: Võru County
- Municipality: Antsla Parish

Population (26.05.2004)
  - Total: 42

Toku (also known as Toku-Suntsi) is a village in Antsla Parish, Võru County, in southeastern Estonia. With a population of 42 (as of 26 May 2004) it's the smallest village in the municipality.

== See also ==
- Toku Lake
