= Soome, Estonia =

Village in Estonia

Soome
- Village
- Location in Estonia
- Coordinates: 57°47′08″N 26°33′59″E
- Country: Estonia
- County: Võru County
- Municipality: Antsla Parish

Soome is a village in Antsla Parish, Võru County in southeastern Estonia.
