= Antsu =

Village in Estonia

- Village
- Location in Estonia
- Coordinates: 57°51′12″N 26°27′41″E
- Country: Estonia
- County: Võru County
- Municipality: Antsla Parish

Population (2011)
  - Total: 47

Antsu is a village in Antsla Parish, Võru County in southeastern Estonia. As of 2011, its population was 47.
