= Urvaste =

Village in Estonia

Urvaste Urvastõ (in Võro)
- Village
- Location in Estonia
- Coordinates: 57°54′54″N 26°35′00″E
- Country: Estonia
- County: Võru County
- Municipality: Antsla Parish

Population (1.01.2020)
  - Total: 91

Urvaste (Võro: Urvastõ; German: Anzen) is a village in Antsla Parish, Võru County, in southeastern Estonia.

Before the 2017 Administrative Reform, the village belonged to Urvaste Parish.

The Tamme-Lauri oak, the thickest and oldest tree in Estonia, is located near Urvaste.

== See also ==
- Kirikuküla, Võru County
