= Madise, Võru County =

Village in Estonia

Madise
- Village
- Location in Estonia
- Coordinates: 57°50′05″N 26°26′58″E
- Country: Estonia
- County: Võru County
- Municipality: Antsla Parish

Madise is a village in Antsla Parish, Võru County in southeastern Estonia.
