= Visela =

Village in Estonia

- Village
- Location within Estonia
- Coordinates: 57.931388888889°N 26.497777777778°E
- Country: Estonia
- County: Võru County
- Parish: Antsla Parish
- Time zone: UTC+2 (EET)
  - Summer (DST): UTC+3 (EEST)

Visela is a village in Antsla Parish, Võru County in Estonia.
