= Kaika, Estonia =

Village in Estonia

Kaika
- Village
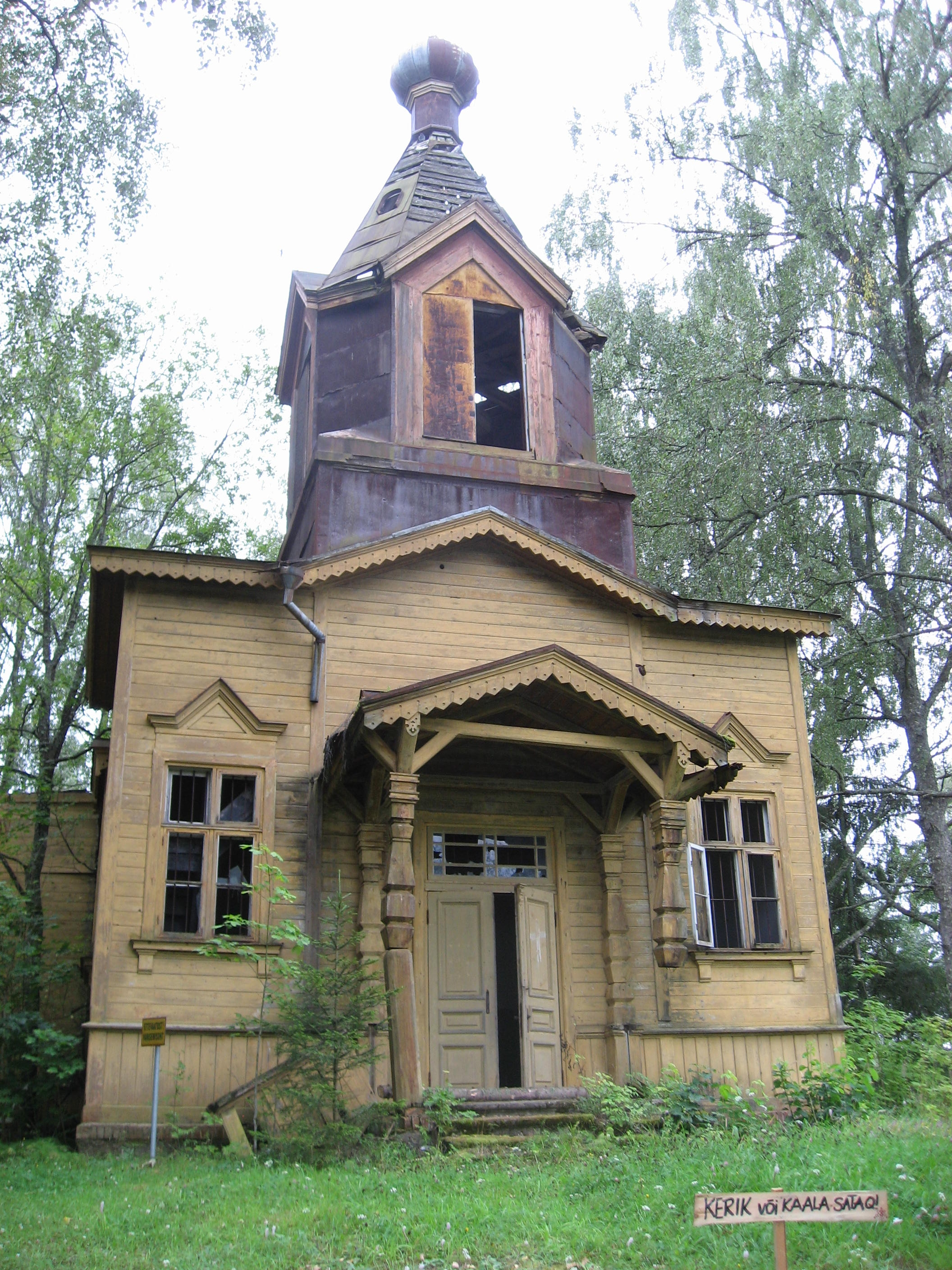
- Kaika Holy Trinity Orthodox Church

- Location in Estonia
- Coordinates: 57°45′03″N 26°31′25″E
- Country: Estonia
- County: Võru County
- Municipality: Antsla Parish

Kaika is a village in Antsla Parish, Võru County in southeastern Estonia.
