= Jõepera, Võru County =

Village in Estonia

Jõepera Iiperä (in Võro)
- Location within Estonia
- Coordinates: 57°45′34″N 26°34′57″E
- Country: Estonia
- County: Võru County
- Time zone: UTC+2 (EET)

Jõepera (Võro: Iiperä) is a settlement in Antsla Parish, Võru County in southeastern Estonia.
