= Kirikuküla, Võru County =

Village in Estonia

Kirikuküla
- Village
- Location within Estonia
- Coordinates: 57°54′40″N 26°32′40″E
- Country: Estonia
- County: Võru County
- Parish: Antsla Parish
- Time zone: UTC+2 (EET)
  - Summer (DST): UTC+3 (EEST)

Kirikuküla is a village in Antsla Parish, Võru County in Estonia.

Urvaste church dates from the early 14th century and is the only medieval rural church in Estonia built in the form of a basilica. The interior dates mainly from the late 19th century.

Marie Heiberg had some of her education in the village. A memorial to Marie Heiberg, which includes a bust of her, has been erected beside Urvaste church.

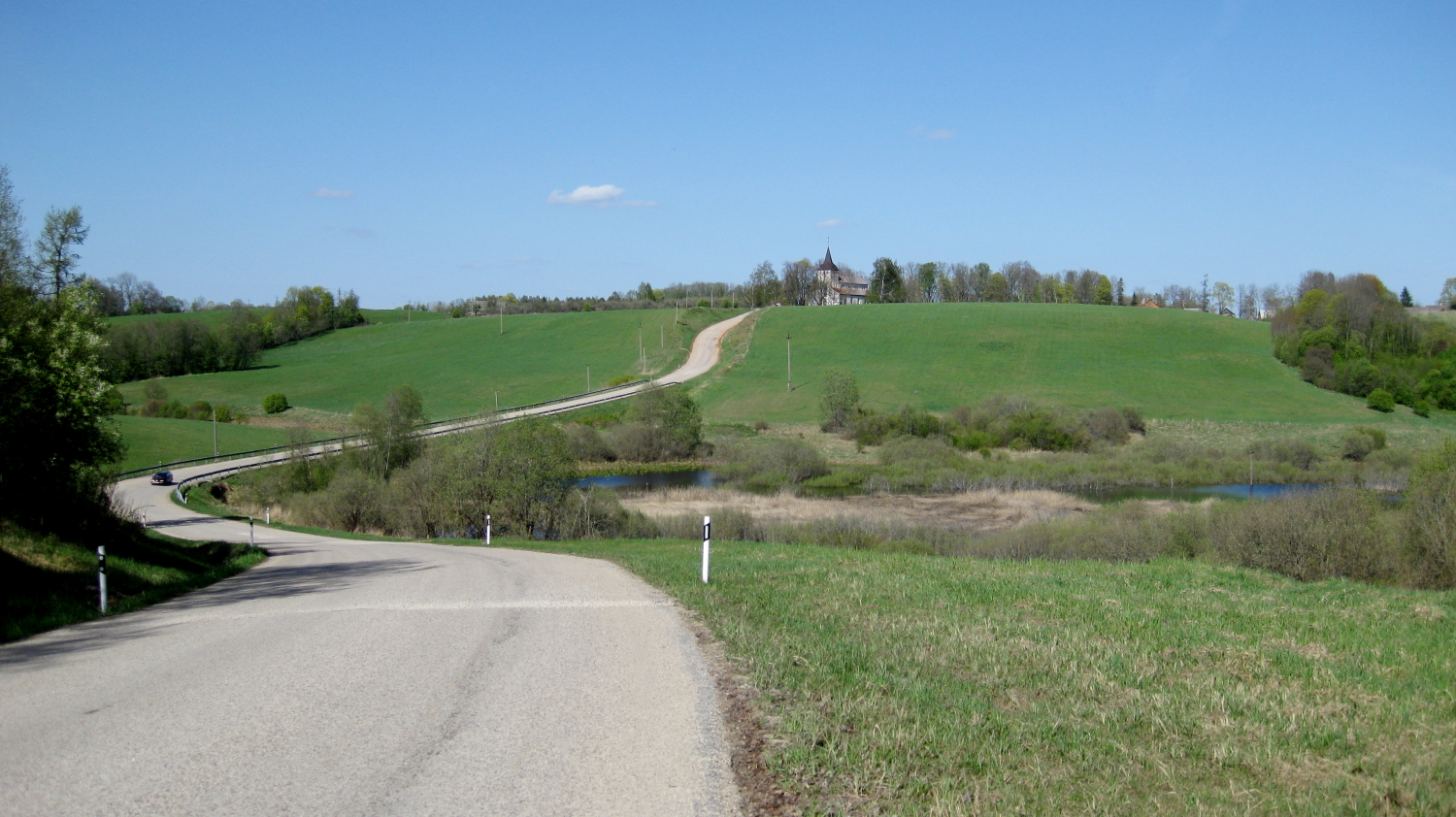

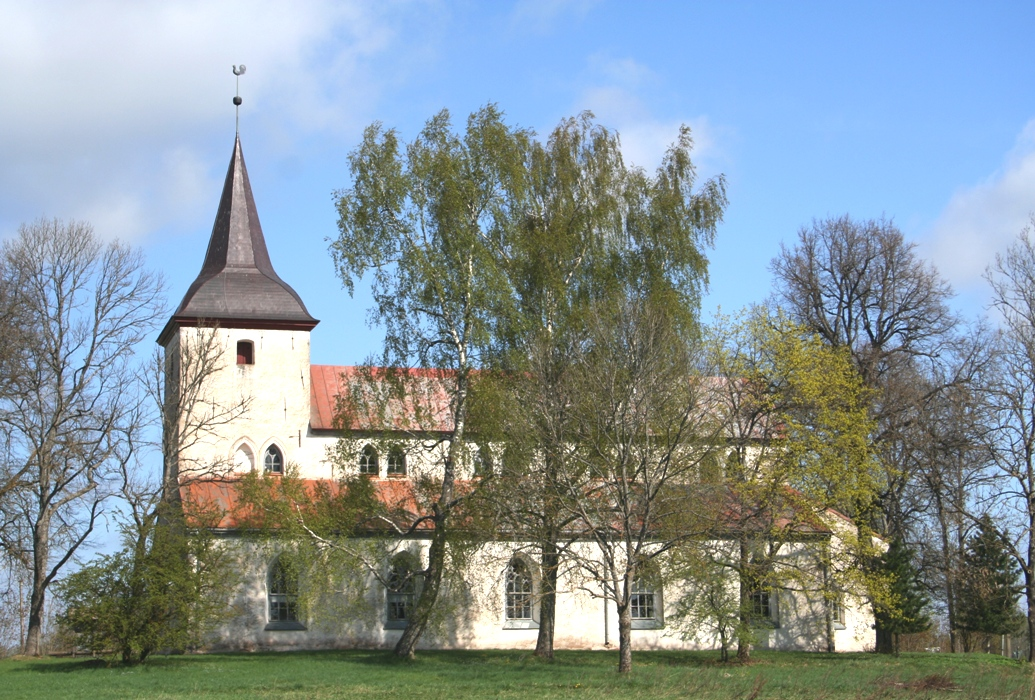
Urvaste church
