= Ruhingu =

Village in Estonia

- Village
- Location within Estonia
- Coordinates: 57.9239°N 26.6506°E
- Country: Estonia
- County: Võru County
- Parish: Antsla Parish
- Time zone: UTC+2 (EET)
  - Summer (DST): UTC+3 (EEST)

Ruhingu is a village in Antsla Parish, Võru County in Estonia.
