= Ähijärve =

Village in Estonia

- Location within Estonia
- Coordinates: 57°43′18″N 26°30′39″E
- Country: Estonia
- County: Võru County
- Municipality: Antsla Parish

Population (2011)
  - Total: 30
- Time zone: UTC+2 (EET)

Ähijärve is a settlement in Antsla Parish, Võru County in southeastern Estonia. As of 2011, its population was 30.

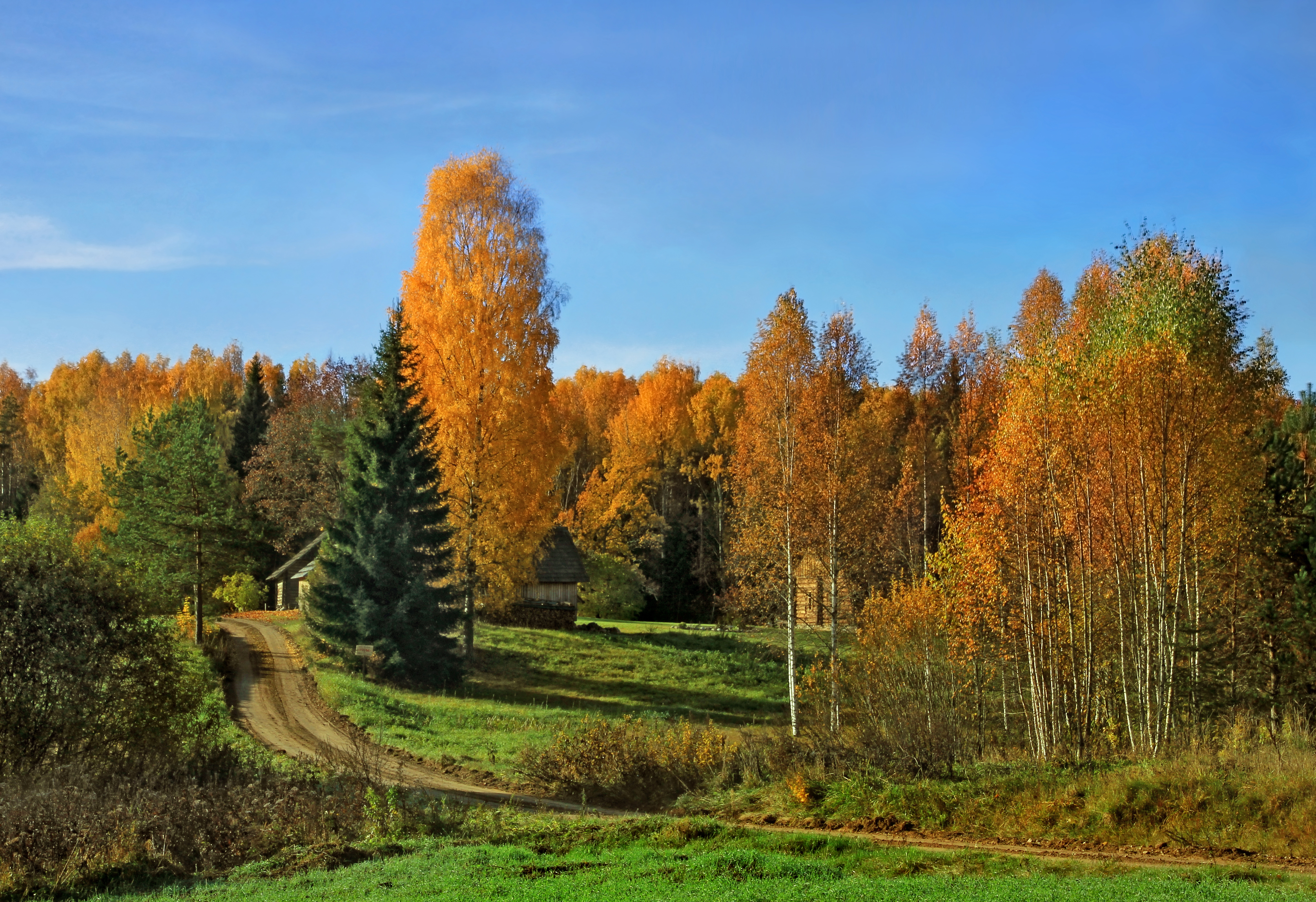
Ähijärve village.Antsla Parish, Võru County
