= Viirapalu =

Village in Estonia

- Location within Estonia
- Coordinates: 57°43′33″N 26°39′16″E
- Country: Estonia
- County: Võru County
- Time zone: UTC+2 (EET)

Viirapalu is a settlement in Antsla Parish, Võru County in southeastern Estonia.
