= Uue-Antsla =

Village in Estonia

- Village
- Location within Estonia
- Coordinates: 57.876944444444°N 26.544722222222°E
- Country: Estonia
- County: Võru County
- Parish: Antsla Parish
- Time zone: UTC+2 (EET)
  - Summer (DST): UTC+3 (EEST)

Uue-Antsla is a village in Antsla Parish, Võru County in Estonia.
