= Lümatu, Võru County =

Village in Estonia

- Village
- Location within Estonia
- Coordinates: 57.890277777778°N 26.605555555556°E
- Country: Estonia
- County: Võru County
- Parish: Antsla Parish
- Time zone: UTC+2 (EET)
  - Summer (DST): UTC+3 (EEST)

Lümatu is a village in Antsla Parish, Võru County in Estonia. As of the 2021 census, the population was 80.
