= Antsla Parish =

Municipality of Estonia (2017)

Antsla Parish Antsla vald
- Municipality
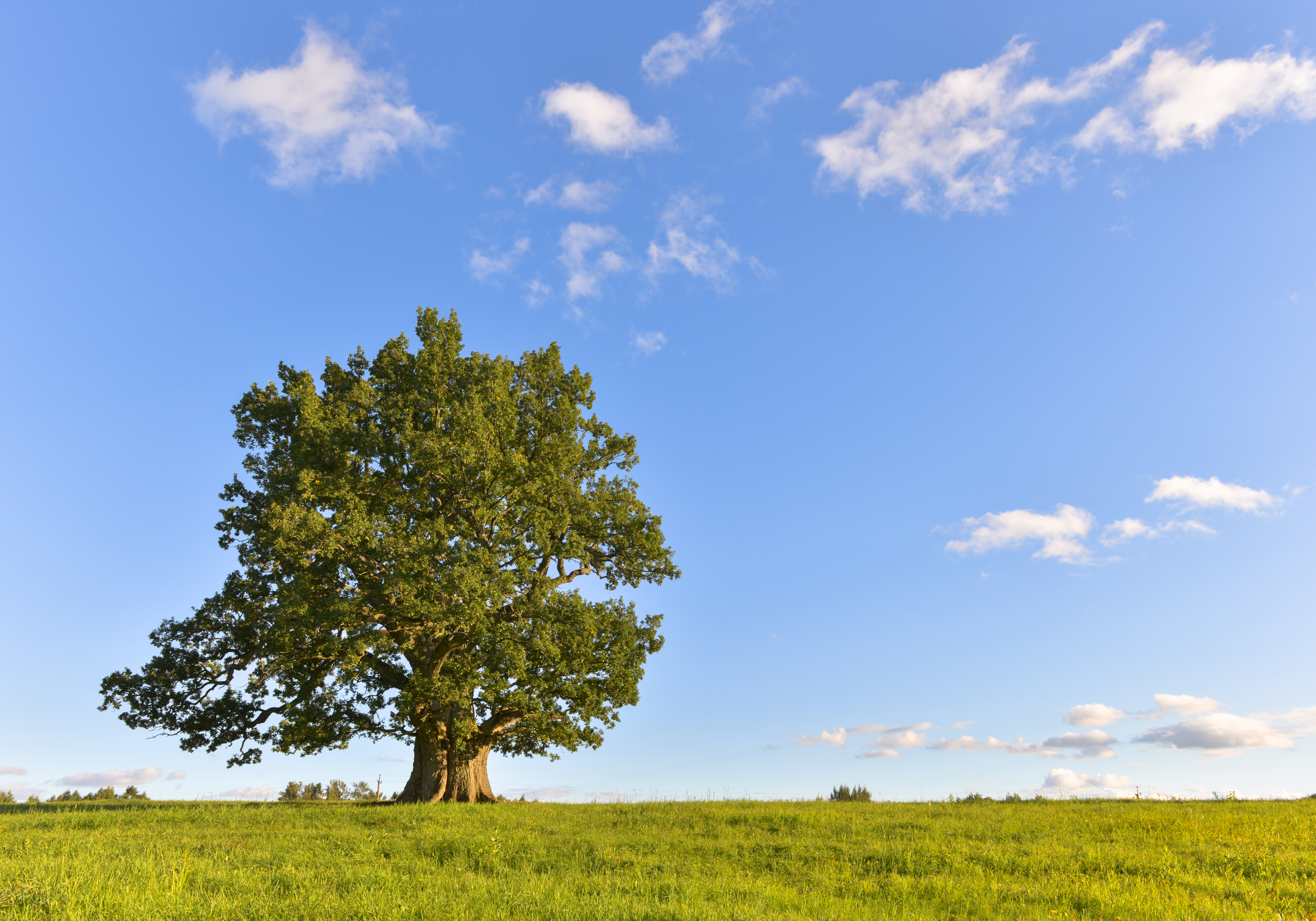
- The Tamme-Lauri oak, which is depicted on the municipality's flag.

- Flag Coat of arms

- Antsla Parish within Võru County.
- Country: Estonia
- County: Võru County
- Administrative centre: Antsla

Area
  - Total: 414 km^{2} (160 sq mi)

Population (2026)
  - Total: 4,144
  - Density: 10.0/km^{2} (25.9/sq mi)
- ISO 3166 code: EE-142
- Website: antsla.ee

Antsla Parish (Estonian: Antsla vald) is a rural municipality of Estonia, in Võru County.

In the territory of the current Antsla Parish, a small castle was mentioned in 1405 and Urvaste church in 1413. From 1950 to 1959, the Antsla district existed more or less on the territory of the current parish.

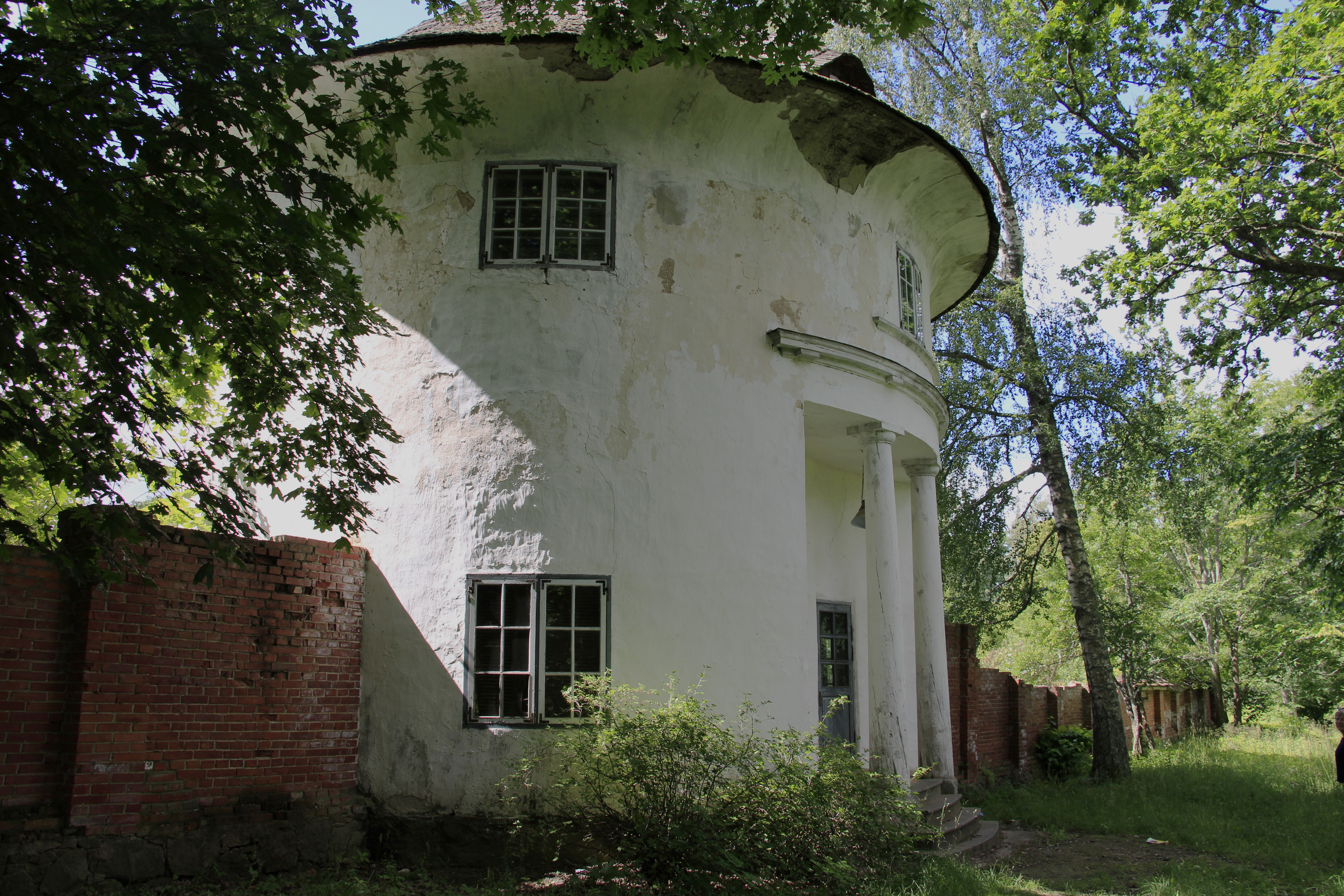
Gardener's house of Vana-Antsla Manor from the 19th century

Karula National Park national park is partly located within the municipality.

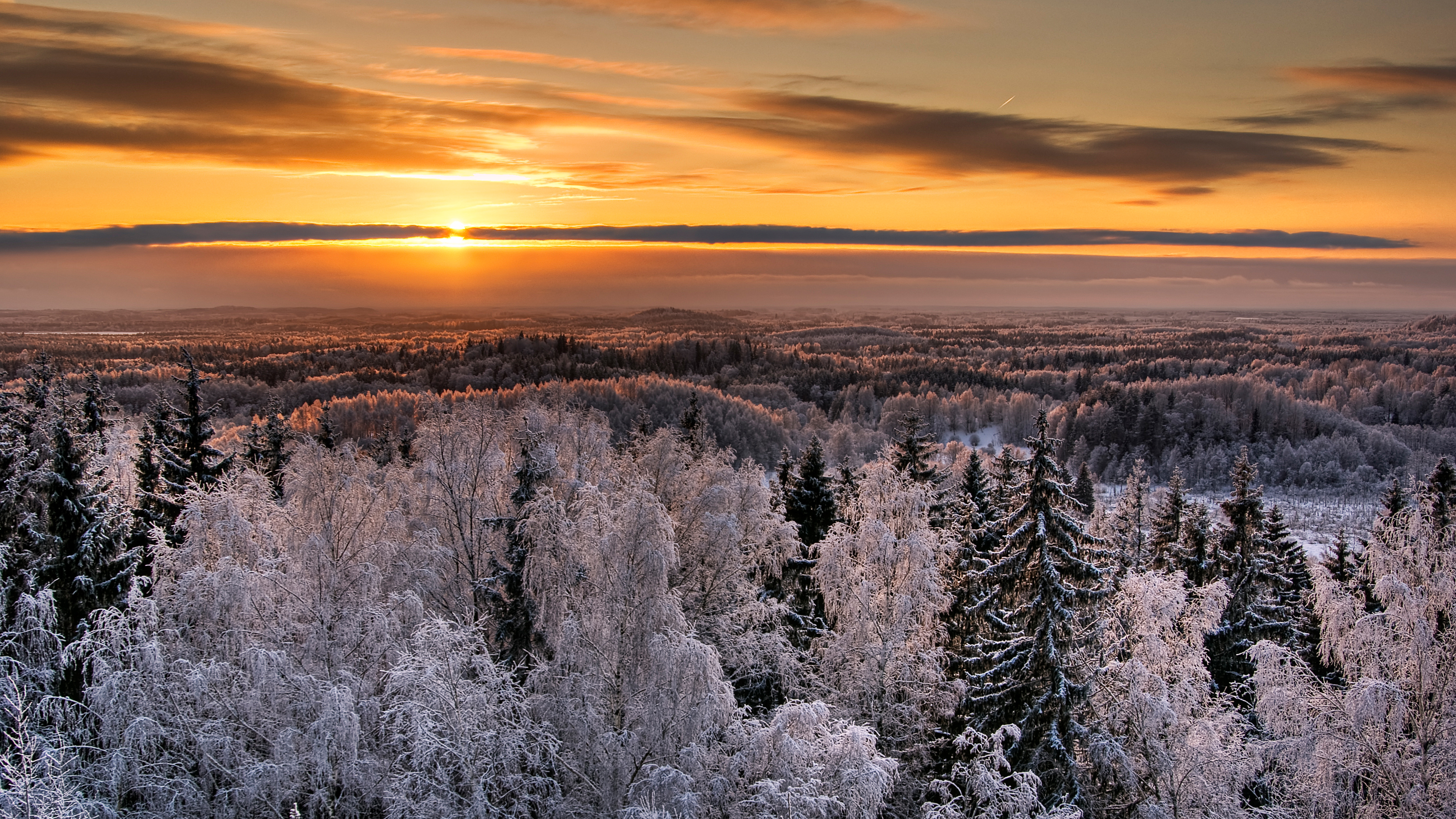
Karula national park

== Settlements ==
Town

Antsla

Small boroughs

Kobela - Vana-Antsla

Villages

Anne - Antsu - Haabsaare - Jõepera - Kaika - Kassi - Kikkaoja - Kirikuküla - Koigu - Kollino - Kraavi - Kuldre - Kõlbi - Litsmetsa - Luhametsa - Lusti - Lustimõisa - Lümatu - Madise - Mähkli - Oe - Pihleni - Piisi - Rimmi - Roosiku - Ruhingu - Savilöövi - Soome - Säre - Taberlaane - Toku - Tsooru - Uhtjärve - Urvaste - Uue-Antsla - Vaabina - Viirapalu - Visela - Ähijärve

== Demographics ==
As of 1 January 2026, the parish had 3,959 residents, of which 2,030 (51.3%) were women and 1,929 (48.7%) were men.

=== Religion ===
Among residents of the parish above 15 years of age, 14.2 per cent declared themselves to be Lutheran, 2.4 per cent to be Orthodox while other Christian denominations made up 1.1 per cent of the population. The majority of residents of the parish, 80.0 per cent, were religiously unaffiliated. 2.3 per cent of the population followed other religions or did not specify their religious affiliation.

== Twinnings ==
Antsla Parish is twinned with:

- Perho, Finland
- Säffle, Sweden
- Uusikaupunki, Finland

== Notable people ==
- Peeter Koemets (1868 in Vana-Antsla – 1950), a Lutheran clergyman and politician, Mayor of Vana-Antsla Parish.
- Karl-Ferdinand Kornel (1882 in Tsooru – 1953), jurist, journalist, diplomat and politician.
- Emma Asson (1889 in Vaabina – 1965), politician, the first woman to be elected to the Estonian parliament.
- Marie Heiberg (1890 in Uhtjärv – 1942), a poet who began writing when she was about 15 years old
- Robert Keres (1907 in Urvaste – 1946), basketball player and track and field athlete, competed at the 1936 Summer Olympics
- Bernard Kangro (1910 in Oe – 1994), writer and poet, he worked at the Vanemuine theater as a dramatist in 1943/44
- Valev Uibopuu (1913 in Vana-Antsla – 1997), a well known expatriate writer, worked for the Estonian Writers' Cooperative
- Vambola Maavara (1928 in Tsooru – 1999), an entomologist, he researched ecology and ethology of social insects
- Kaarel Kiidron (born 1990 in Urvaste), footballer who has played over 250 games and 1 for Estonia.
