= Koigu, Võru County =

Village in Estonia

- Village
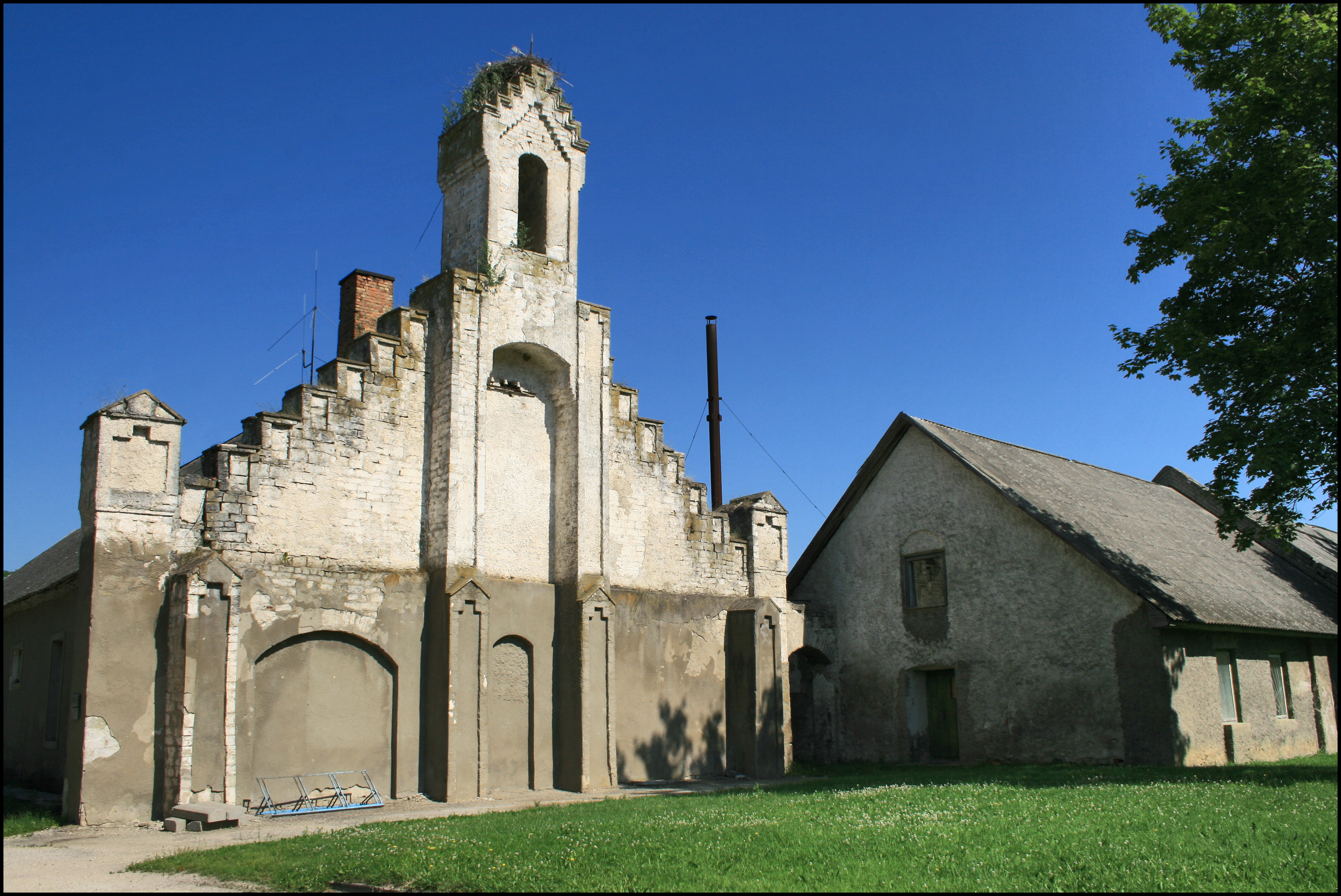

- Location within Estonia
- Coordinates: 57.935277777778°N 26.538611111111°E
- Country: Estonia
- County: Võru County
- Parish: Antsla Parish
- Time zone: UTC+2 (EET)
  - Summer (DST): UTC+3 (EEST)

Koigu is a village in Antsla Parish, Võru County in Estonia.
