= Uhtjärve =

Village in Estonia

- Village
- Location within Estonia
- Coordinates: 57.892777777778°N 26.559166666667°E
- Country: Estonia
- County: Võru County
- Parish: Antsla Parish
- Time zone: UTC+2 (EET)
  - Summer (DST): UTC+3 (EEST)

Uhtjärve is a village in Antsla Parish, Võru County in Estonia. As of the 2021 census, the population was 71.

Uhtjärve has an area of 8.559 km² and a population density (2021) of 8.295/km².

Population structure in 2021
Gender	Number	Percentage
Male	39	54.9%
Female	32	45.1%
Total	71	100%
