= Lusti, Võru County =

Village in Estonia

Lusti
- Village
- Location in Estonia
- Coordinates: 57°49′38″N 26°29′41″E
- Country: Estonia
- County: Võru County
- Municipality: Antsla Parish

Lusti is a village in Antsla Parish, Võru County in southeastern Estonia. As of 2021, the population was 178, with a population density of 31.51 people per square kilometer.
