= Vambola Maavara =

Estonian entomologist and travelog writer

Vambola Maavara (10 February 1928 Tsooru Parish – 14 May 1999 Tartu) was an Estonian entomologist and travelog writer.

In 1951 he graduated from Tartu State University in biology. From 1947 to 1991 he worked at the Estonian Institute of Zoology and Botany. From 1992 to 1998 he worked at Estonian University of Life Sciences' Plant Protection Institute.

His main fields of research were ecology and ethology of social insects, forest entomology, myrmecology, sociobiology. He was one of the most prominent ant researcher in Estonia. He discovered about 20 new ant species.

== Works ==
- Noore entomoloogi käsiraamat (1956, with author's illustrations)
- Metsakaitse (1961, one of the authors and illustrator)
- Taimekaitse aktuaalsed küsimused (1970)
- Mägedest mägedeni (1979, with author's illustrations)
- Sotsiobioloogia arenguloost ja olemusest. – Biosüsteemide kooseksisteerimise teooria, 1986
- Madal- ja siirdesoode loomastik. Rabade loomastik. – Eesti sood, 1988
