= Paul Friedrich von Benckendorff =

Baltic German politician (1784-1841)

- Павел Ермолаевич Бенкендорф
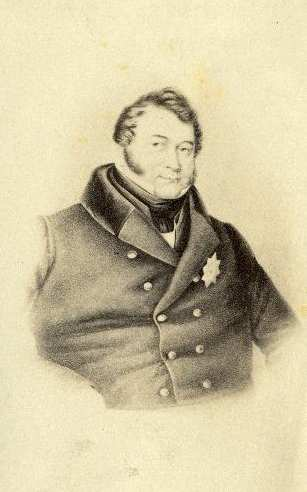
- Benckendorff in the early 19th century

Civil Governor of the Governorate of Estonia
- In office 1833–1841
- Preceded by: Otto Wilhelm von Essen
- Succeeded by: Johann Engelbrecht Christoph von Grünewaldt

Head of the Estonian Knighthood
- In office 1824–1827

Personal details
- Born: 7 December 1784 Gatchina, Saint Petersburg Governorate, Russian Empire
- Died: 14 December 1841 (aged 57) Reval, Governorate of Estonia, Russian Empire
- Resting place: St Mary's Cathedral, Tallinn
- Spouse: Dorothea Helene Margarethe Elisabeth von Rehbinder
- Children: 5, including Gustav Hermann Christoph von Benckendorff
- Parent: Hermann Johann von Benckendorff (father)
- Relatives: Johann Michael von Benckendorff (grandfather)
- Awards: Order of Saint Anna, 1st class

Paul Friedrich von Benckendorff (Russian: Павел Ермолаевич Бенкендорф; 7 December [O.S. 26 November] 1784 - 14 December [O.S. 2 December] 1841) was a Baltic German landowner and politician in the Russian Empire. He served as head of the Estonian Knighthood from 1824 to 1827, as a member of the provincial council from 1827, and as civil governor of the Governorate of Estonia from 1833 until his death in 1841.

== Early life and military service ==
Benckendorff was born at Gatchina in the Saint Petersburg Governorate. He belonged to the Benckendorff family of the Baltic German nobility. His father, Hermann Johann von Benckendorff, was an officer, landowner and district marshal in Estonia; his mother was Christine Elisabeth von Brevern. His paternal grandfather was the Russian lieutenant general Johann Michael von Benckendorff.

In 1802, Benckendorff entered the Semyonovsky Life Guards Regiment. He left regular military service in 1804 with the rank of second lieutenant and subsequently managed the family estates at Ass and Sternhof. In 1806, he became a company commander in the Estonian mobile militia. He later acquired the estates of Warrang and Lammasküll.

== Political career ==
Benckendorff entered provincial administration in 1813, when he was elected a district magistrate, or Hakenrichter. He held that office until 1818 and then served as a district deputy from 1818 to 1824. From 1824 to 1827 he was Ritterschaftshauptmann, or head, of the Estonian Knighthood, the corporate body representing the province's predominantly Baltic German landed nobility.

In 1827 he became a Landrat, a member of Estonia's senior provincial council, and received the civil-service rank of state councillor. He remained a member of the council until 1834. In October 1833, he was appointed civil governor of the Governorate of Estonia, whose administrative centre was at Reval. He held the governorship until his death in 1841 and attained the rank of Actual State Councillor.

During his governorship, Benckendorff supported the reconstruction of St. Olaf's Church in Reval after it had been damaged by fire. In 1835, he joined a consortium established to create a seminary for village schoolteachers. The institution opened at Alexanderhof in 1837.

In October 1840, he was awarded the Order of St. Anna, first class, for his service to the Russian Empire.

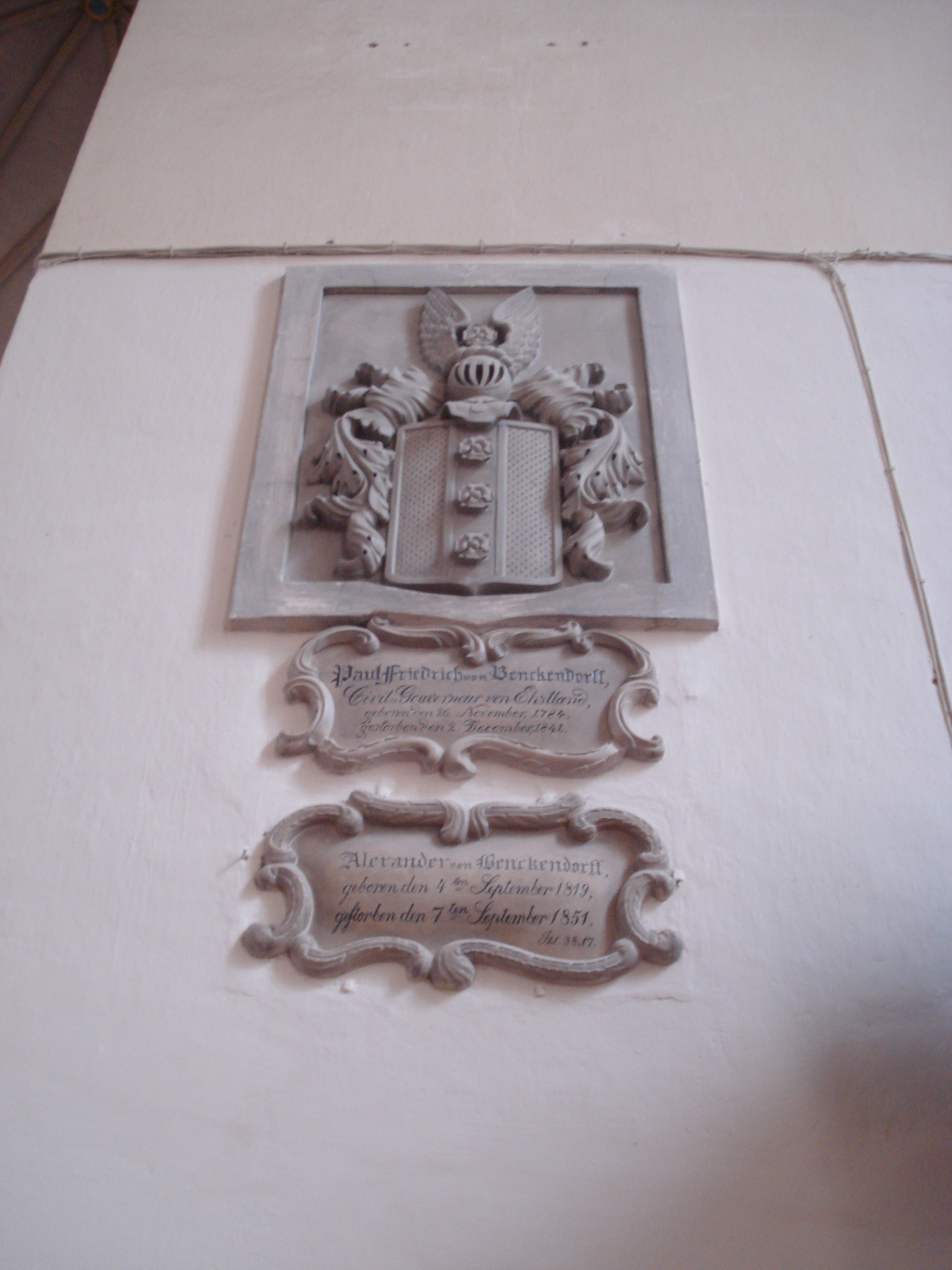
The epitaphs of Paul Friedrich von Benckendorff and his son Alexander in St. Olaf's Church, Tallinn

== Family ==
In 1805, Benckendorff married Dorothea Helene Margarethe Elisabeth von Rehbinder (1788-1856) at Löwenwolde in Estonia. They had five children:

- Sophie Christine Wilhelmine von Benckendorff (1806-1863);
- Gustava Magdalena Marie von Benckendorff (1811-1892);
- Gustav Hermann Christoph von Benckendorff (1815-1883), who later served as head of the Estonian Knighthood and as a provincial councillor;
- Gustav Christoph Karl von Benckendorff (1817-1842), an officer in Russian service; and
- Gotthard Alexander Konstantin von Benckendorff (1819-1851), a Russian military officer.

Benckendorff died in Reval on 14 December 1841 and was buried at St Mary's Cathedral, Tallinn. He was succeeded as civil governor by Johann Engelbrecht Christoph von Grünewaldt.
