= Governorate of Estonia =

1796–1917 unit of Russia

Coordinates: 59°26′14″N 24°44′43″E

Estonia Governorate: Эстляндская губерния (Russian); Eestimaa kubermang (Estonian); Gouvernement Estland (German)
- Governorate
- Coat of arms

- Location in the Russian Empire
- Country: Russian Empire
- Established: 1796
- Abolished: 1917
- Capital: Reval (present-day Tallinn)
- Counties: 4

Area
  - Total: 20,246.7 km^{2} (7,817.3 sq mi)
- Highest elevation (Emumägi): 166 m (545 ft)

Population (1897)
  - Total: 412,716
  - Density: 20.3844/km^{2} (52.7952/sq mi)
  - Urban: 18.68%
  - Rural: 81.32%

The Estonia Governorate, (Note: Russian: Эстля́ндская губе́рния, pre-reform orthography: Эстля́ндская губе́рнія, romanized: Estlyándskaya gubérniya; German: Gouvernement Estland; Estonian: Eestimaa kubermang) also historically known as the Estland or Esthonia Governorate, was a province (guberniya) and one of the Baltic governorates of the Russian Empire. It was located in northern Estonia and included some islands in the West Estonian archipelago, including Hiiumaa and Vormsi. Previously, the Reval Governorate existed during Peter I's reign and was confirmed by the Treaty of Nystad, which ceded territory from Sweden to the newly established Russian Empire. The Estonia Governorate was established in 1796 when Paul I's reforms abolished the Reval Viceroyalty. The port city of Reval (known in Russian as Revel, contemporary Tallinn) was the administrative centre where the governor had his seat.

From the 1850s to 1914, the Estonian national awakening influenced and characterized the governorate by general modernization, the reorganization into a modern European society, and the success of the newly emerged nationalist awareness. The accession of Alexander III in 1881 marked the beginning of a period of more rigid Russification; the previous Baltic civil and criminal codes were replaced with Russian ones, and the Russian language replaced the German language and Estonian language. Jaan Tõnisson founded the National Liberal Party and organized its first congress in 1905, in the course of the First Russian Revolution; in response, the Russian government suppressed the revolution by declaring martial law, causing Konstantin Päts and the radical leader Jaan Teemant to flee abroad. The governorate gained more territories from the Governorate of Livonia and was granted autonomy on 12 April 1917, and lasted for nearly a year. The Estonian independence that came on 24 February 1918 marked the permanent end for the governorate.

Until the late 19th century the governorate was administered independently by the local Baltic German nobility through a feudal Regional Council.

== History ==
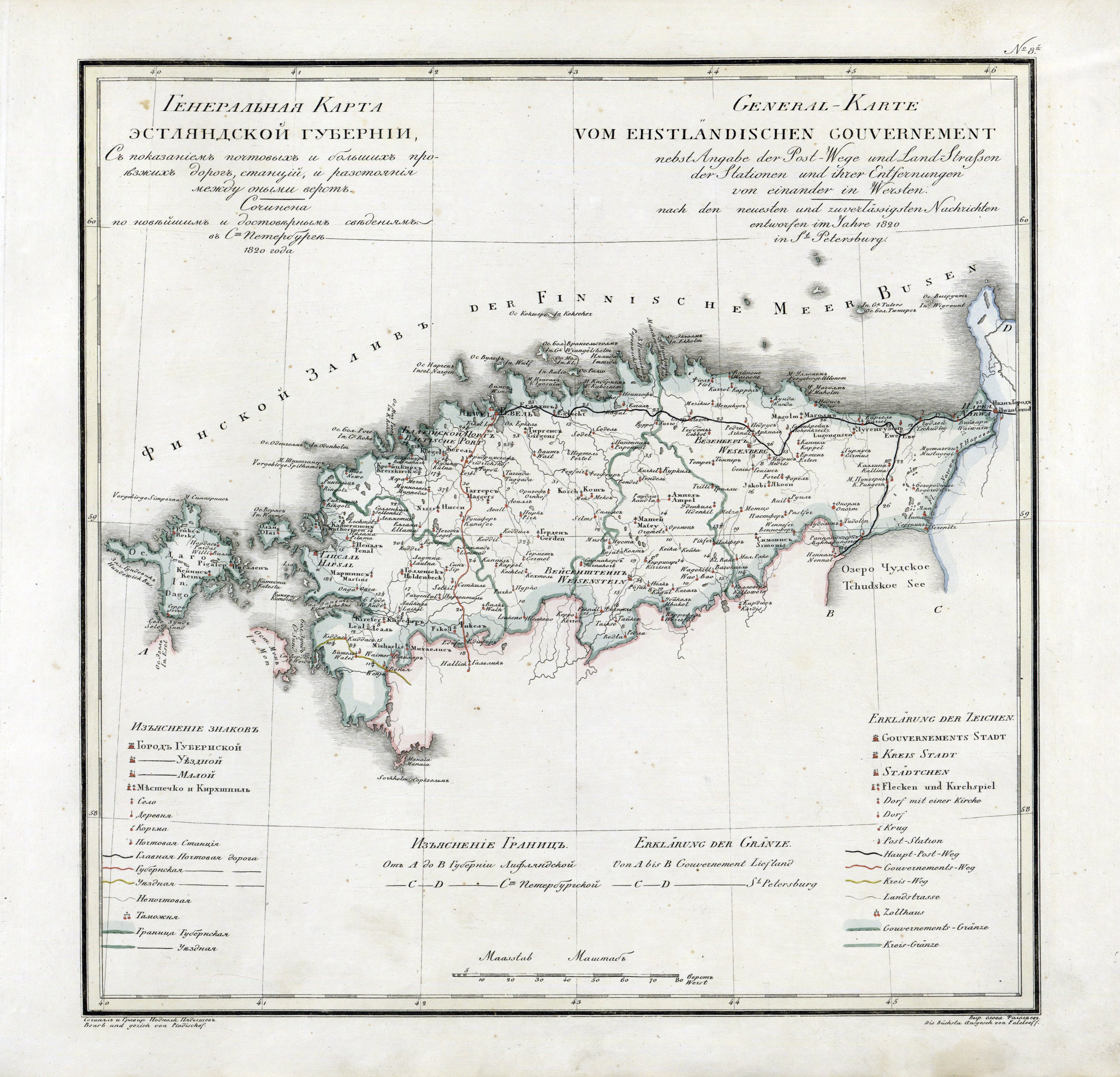
German and Russian map of Governorate of Estonia

From 1561, Estonia had been under the control as a dominion of the Swedish Empire following the annexation of the northern part of the Livonian Confederation, in which nobles swore obedience to the Swedish king Eric XIV as the Russians, in 1558, invaded Livonia, which prompted the Livonian War. The Treaty of Plussa forced Russia to cede to Sweden possessions along the southern shore of the Gulf of Finland, including northern Livonia and Ingria.

Seeking to regain lost territories, in 1700, Tsar Peter I and his allies invaded Sweden, beginning the Great Northern War. He initially met with setbacks by King Charles XII but later gained triumphs. In 1710, the Russians advanced into Estonia and Livonia, which were incorporated into Russia. In the Treaty of Nystad of 1721, Sweden formally ceded its former dominion of Estonia, Livonia, and its other territories to Russia, whereas Russia paid Sweden compensation of 2 million efimki (1.3 million rubles).

Initially named Reval Governorate after the city of Reval (now known as Tallinn), it was established in 1719 by decree of Peter the Great on 29 May, on the territory that was acquired from Sweden, along with the Riga Governorate. In 1783, the Reval Viceroyalty was formed from Reval Governorate, and in 1796, with the abolition of the viceroyalty system, the Estonia Governorate was formed. During the reign of the Swedish kings, there was a tendency towards granting more autonomy to the peasantry, but under the Russian tsars, there was a shift towards tighter regulation. Serfdom remained in place until its abolition in 1816.

=== Rise of the Estonian cultural identity ===
The early course of the reign of Alexander II marked the emergence of the Estonian national movement, which periodised the so-called Estonian age of awakening that led to the birth of a distinctive Estonian national culture and laid the groundwork for its growing roles in Baltic politics. As agricultural reforms, the spread of education, increasing communication beyond the Baltic, and the spirit of reformation were factors in the national awakening, from 1860, the Estonian national movement had gained more support from rising Estonians. Although many Estonians still continued to assimilate into the German and Russian cultures, many nationwide efforts to promote the Estonian culture were seen, especially for the Estonian-language Alexander School, the Society of Estonian Literati, and the all-Estonian song festivals.

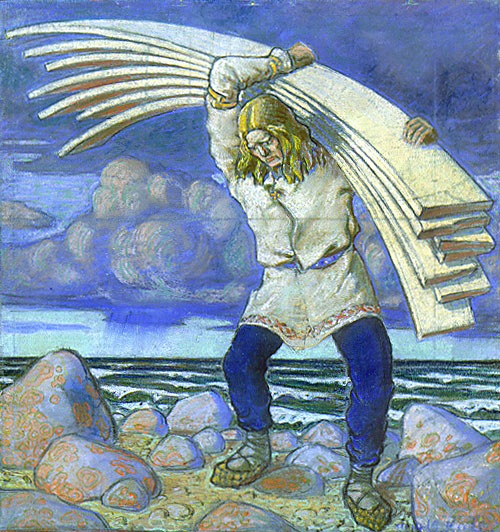
The national epic Kalevipoeg, written by Friedrich Reinhold Kreutzwald, published in 1862.

The prominent figure in the period was Carl Robert Jakobson from the neighbouring Governorate of Livonia; he opposed the Baltic German dominance and took an anti-clerical position on the Lutheran Church. He had also begun campaigning for the introduction of zemstvo, which had already existed in the empire; in June 1881, seventeen Estonian societies requested that they do so with equal representations for Germans and Estonians, in a memorandum to Alexander III. As a result, four of the ten points of the memorandum were implemented at the end of the 1880s.

Also in this era, poet Lydia Koidula had been a prominent figure in the advocation of Estonian literature; she wrote her most important work, Emajõe ööbik (The Nightingale of Emajõgi), which was published in 1867. Friedrich Reinhold Kreutzwald composed his epic Kalevipoeg, in which he portrayed the mythological adventures of the eponymous hero, who had ended up in chains at the gate of Hell and the promise of a return to home; Kalevipoeg has been later considered the national epic. Among Koidula and Kreutzwald were Mihkel Veske, Ado Reinvald, Friedrich Kuhlbars, and others. Many works in this era reflected the condition of rural people and satirised the elites. Publication of Estonian-language print grew rapidly from 1860 to 1900, and the number of books and brochures increased sixfold, from 55 to 312. According to the 1897 census, 96.9 per cent of Estonians, 10 years and older, could read and write, making the northern Baltic area the most literate region of the empire.

=== Russification ===
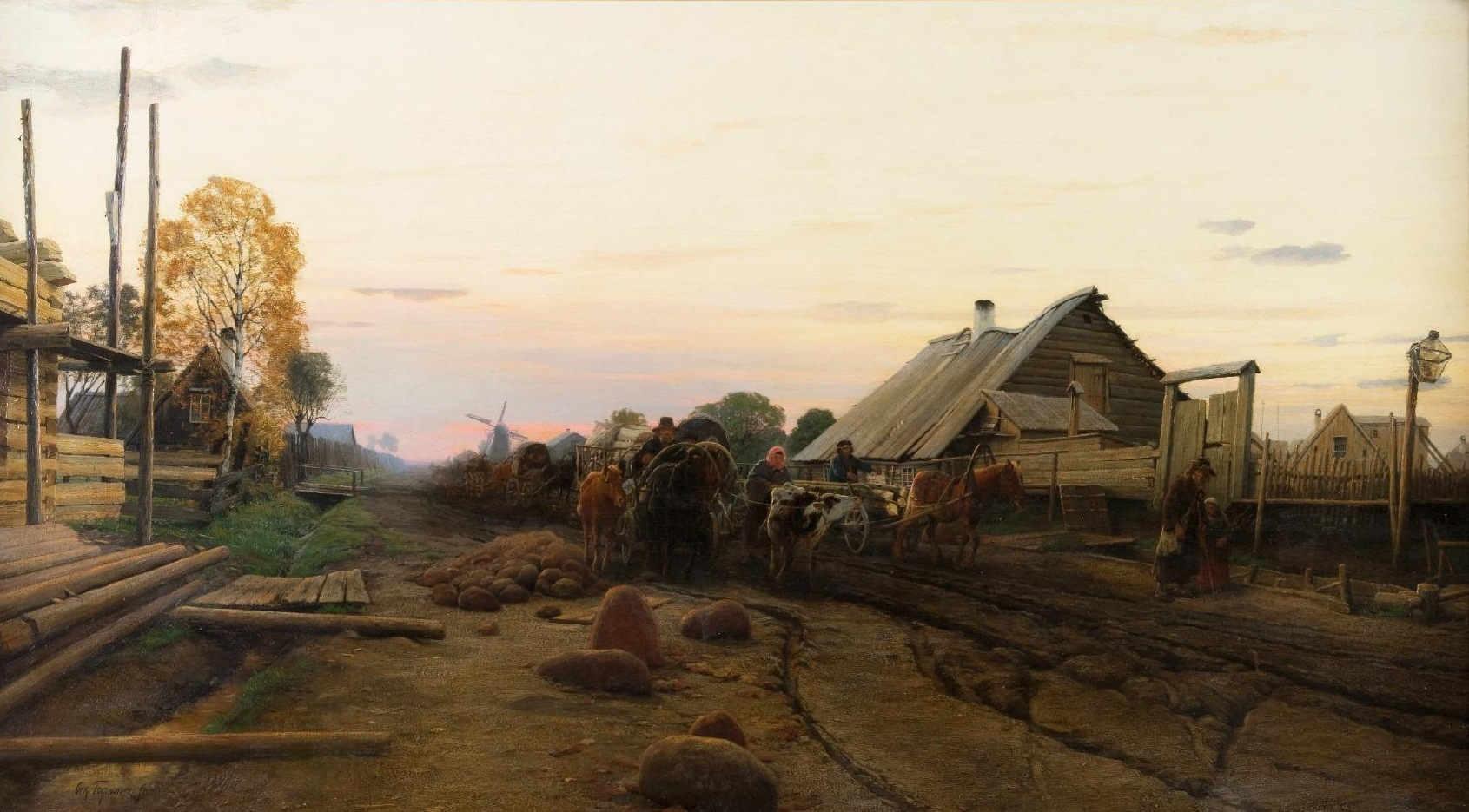
Road to Reval, painted by Oskar Hoffmann in 1900

In 1885, the appointment of Sergey Shakhovskoy to the governorship of Estonia by Emperor Alexander III marked the beginning of a process of Russification in Estonia. In 1877, the Russian urban reform of 1870 took place in the Baltic area. The new law enfranchised men 25 years of age and over, which was divided into three curiae according to the city taxes they paid, replacing the medieval estate-based system that had excluded Estonians from participation in the municipal government. Virtually all Estonians, in fact, belonged to the third curia since their bourgeoisie was only beginning to improve its economic position. The 1892 municipal law, in which the franchise base was determined by property value, was implemented in the Baltic provinces; for Estonians, it would increase the possibility of winning over the Baltic German hegemony, and for the bourgeoisie, it would be a step forward to put all voters in the same place.

In 1888–1889, the Russification of the police system took place: the Baltic Germans lost all police powers in the rural township, although they retained powers on their estates; and the police system at county and urban levels was reorganised and placed under the Minister of Internal Affairs, by which all higher police officers were appointed. The new Russian officers regarded Estonian local affairs with disinterest, and its population was more impartial than the German ones, although they were non-Estonian. The Russification of jurisdiction, although the Baltic legal codes remained unchanged, was taken as well, by which the peasantry had its own courts, the township court, with appeals to the higher court for the peasantry. In 1864, the Russian institution reform was introduced, which brought more impartial justice: the justice of the peace with appeals to the conference of justices of the peace; and the circuit court with appeals to the court chamber. The major problem was that proceedings in the higher court were conducted exclusively in Russian, which meant the Estonians, who were not fluent in Russian, were forced to hire translators or lawyers, involving a prohibitive expense for destitute Estonians.

Russification policies were also implemented in education: placing all Lutheran rural elementary schools under the jurisdiction of the Ministry of Education; creating the position of director and inspector so the ministry insured the state control; and introducing Russian as an instruction language in the third year of the school in 1887 and then the first year in 1892. Initially, the results of Russification were disorganization: many schools, which the Baltic Germans withdrew support for in protest, were closed; much of the teaching personnel were unable to teach Russian; and the number of pupils in the governorate declined, from 25,646 to 20,565 between 1886 and 1892.

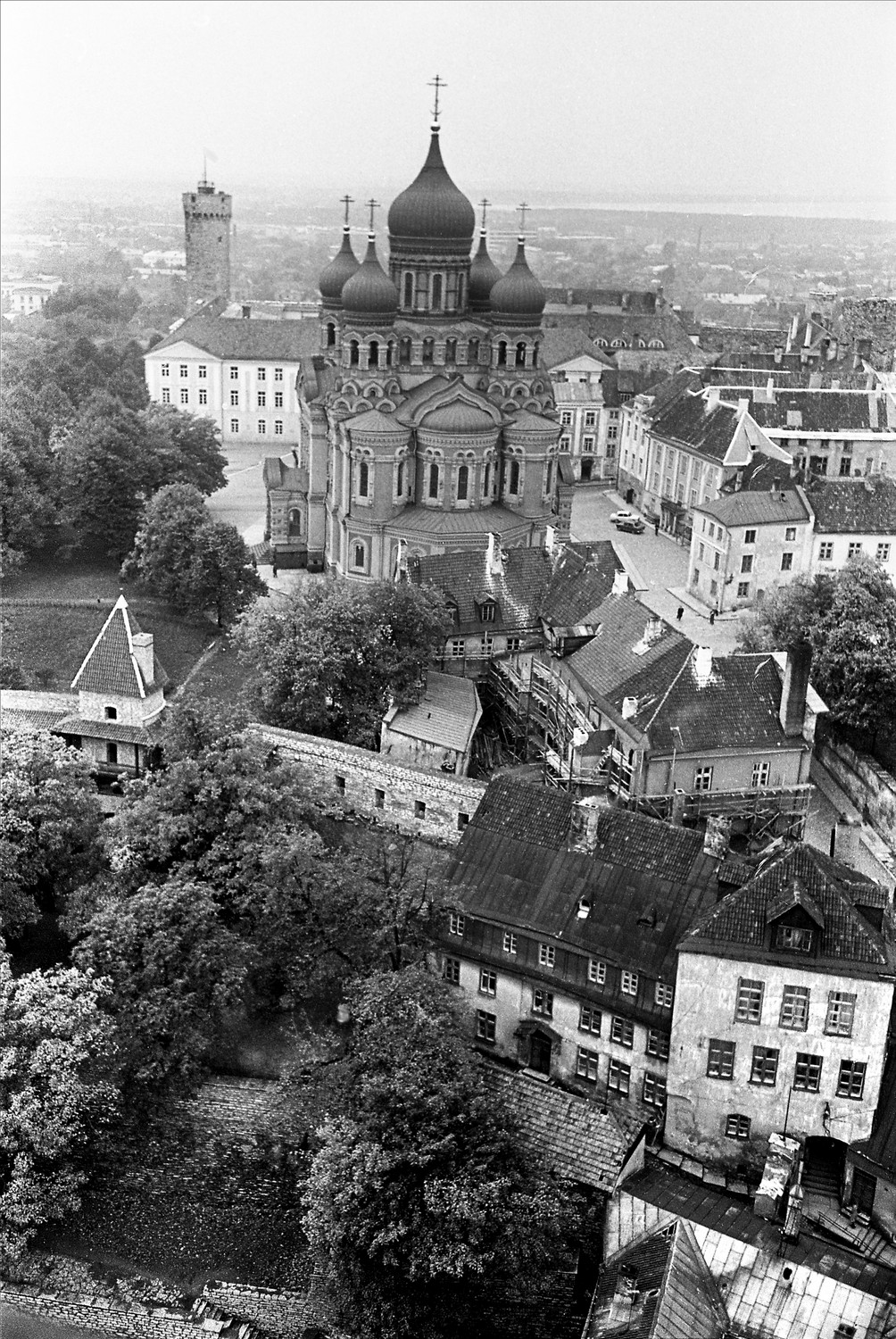
Built in 1894, the Alexander Nevsky Cathedral in Reval is the symbol of the Orthodox Church in the Governorate

The promotion of Russian Orthodoxy in the Baltic area starting in the 1840s caused a struggle with the local Lutheran church, which a majority of Estonians had adhered to since the Northern Crusades. In 1883, motivated by anti-German sentiment a conversion movement among 3,400 Estonian peasants began in Wiek county. During his first tenure as governor, Shakhovskoy sought to propagate Orthodoxy in his ruling governorate, which caused spiritual dissatisfaction among the Baltic natives who lived under a German-controlled Protestantism. In 1886, Shakhovskoy suggested to the procurator of the Holy Synod, Konstantin Pobedonostsev, that Orthodoxy was the quickest way to unite the Estonians into the "great Russian family". Furthermore, in 1885, Alexander III reinstated that children of mixed Lutheran-Orthodox marriages be only baptised as Orthodox, and the reconverts to Lutheranism were again considered members of the state church.

Another major factor was the gradual introduction of Russian as the language of administration in 1885; by 1889, Russian had become the language in municipal government and exclusively in higher courts, as well as in communication among all administrative organs. The Estonian intelligentsia, which had sought equal rights for Estonian as an administrative language and had been rooted in a Baltic Weltanschauung, disapproved of this. Some of them, who had received their education in German, were able to adjust after a long process.

=== 1905 Revolution ===
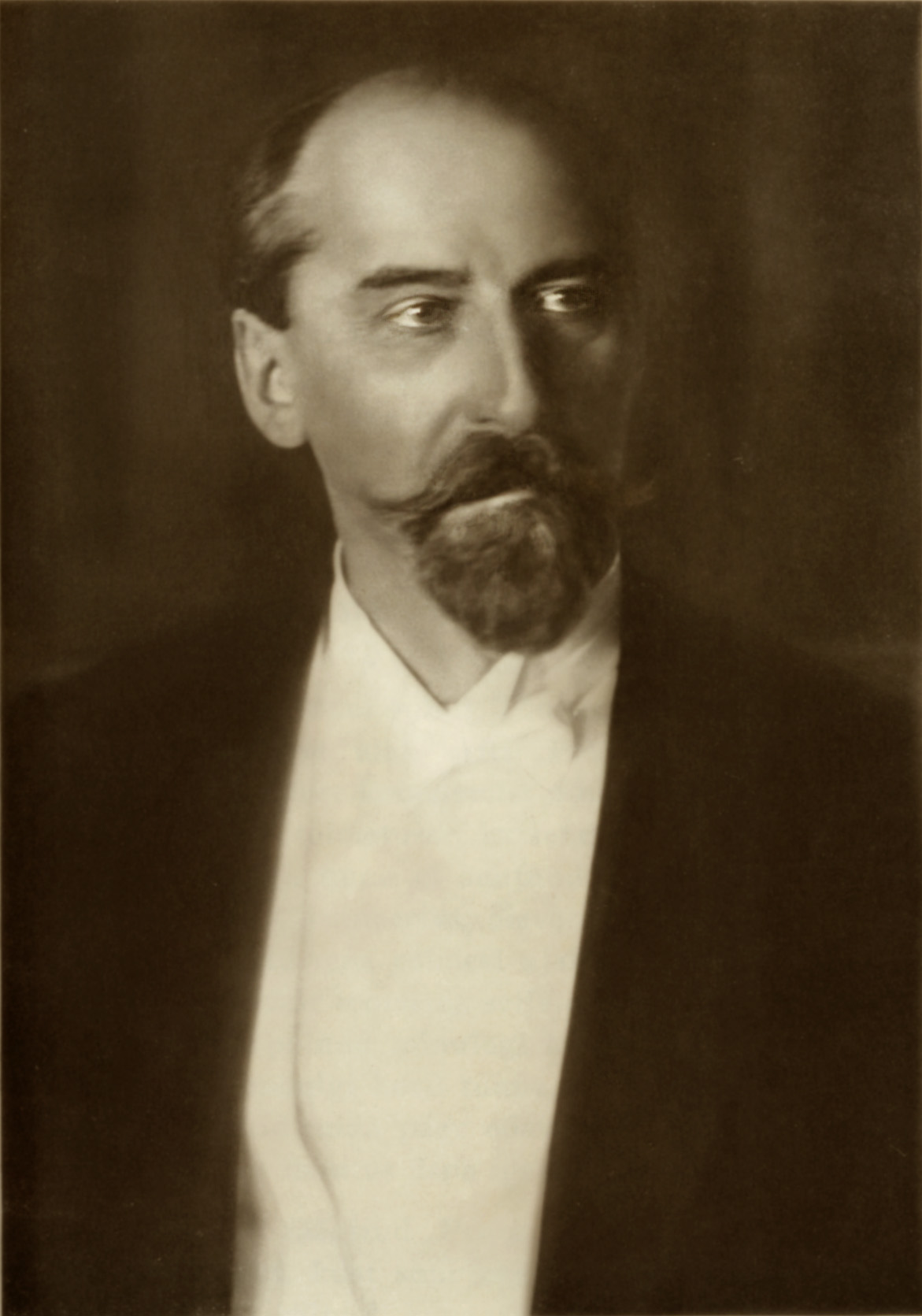
Jaan Tõnisson, founder of the Estonian Progressive People's Party.

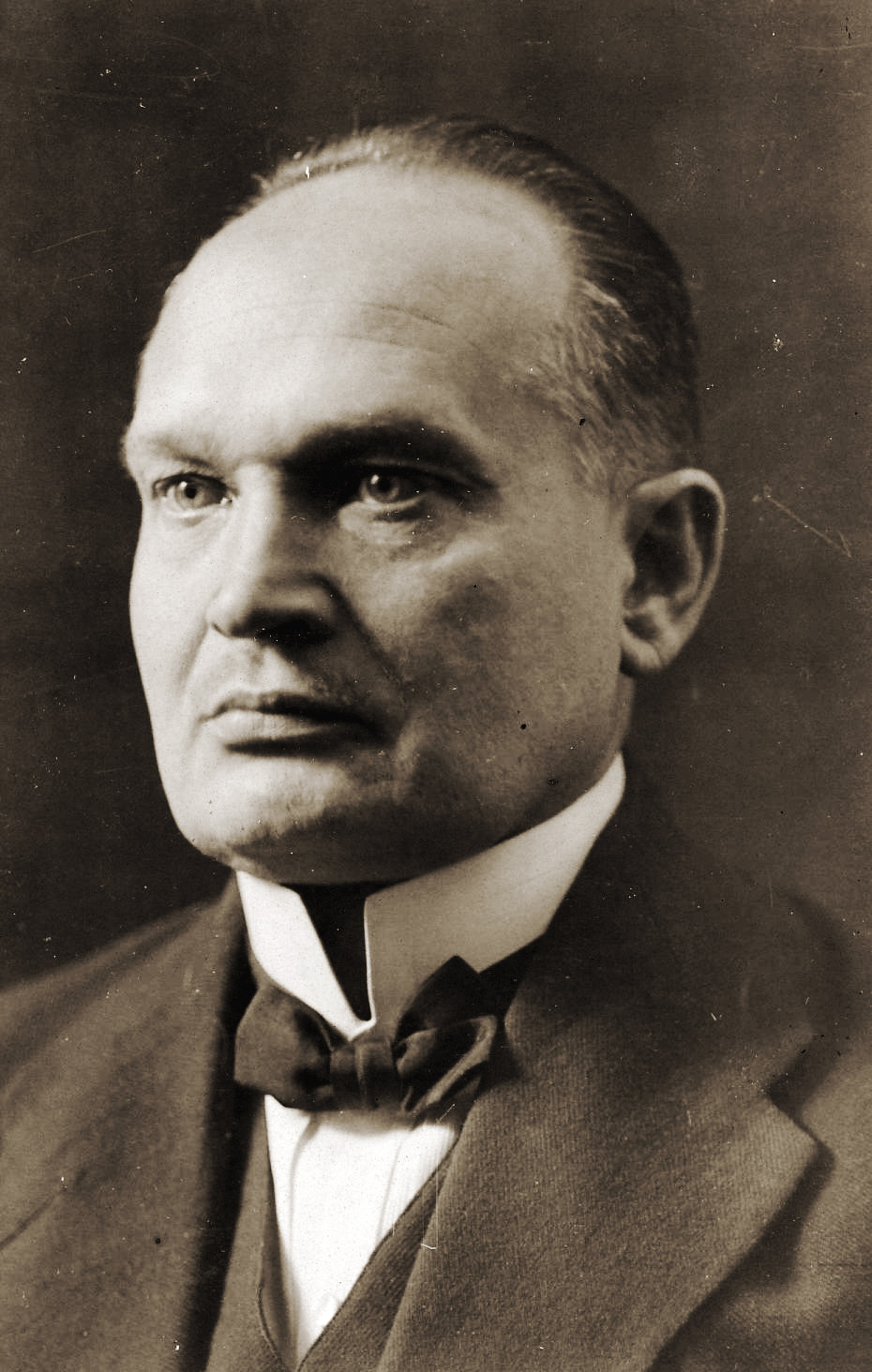
Konstantin Päts, founder of Teataja and later head of the Estonian Provisional Government.

With the rise of the liberation movement in Russia, all-Empire questions began to impinge on Estonian life, as well as a new generation emerged in Estonia. The crucial point in social and political thought was the appearance of journalistic voices for the lower class, engaging in the fade of loyalty to the crown. Many intellectuals emerged in the post-Russification era; among them were Jaan Tõnisson, who represented a renewal of the moderate political orientation, and Konstantin Päts, the editor of Teataja in Reval.

In 1905, the massacre on Bloody Sunday became the final straw that brought about the revolution, whose impulse had spread into the rural area of the Baltic region; the Russian Social Democratic Labour Party organised activity in Estonia, with its counterpart formed in August. The worker strikes broke out in Reval, Narva, and Pernau in January 1905. In the rural area, 120 manor houses, which were the symbol of Baltic German power, were put to the torch by Estonians. Mass meetings called for peaceful reform in Reval, and the situation remained calm until 16 October; the Russian Army on that day, however, opened fire on a peaceful demonstration on a market square, which was later known as the Tallinn Bloodbath.

In November 1905, Jaan Tõnisson founded the Estonian Progressive People's Party, which, along with the Baltic German-led Baltic Constitutional Party, was the only legal party in the governorate at that time. The All-Estonian Congress was held by Tõnisson and his moderates on 27–29 November, with the authority permitting that. Following the dispute over the election of vice-chairs, the congress was split into two factions: the moderates, known as the Bürgermusse; and the radicals, known as the Aula. Nevertheless, both factions demanded the repeal of Russification; the moderates demanded the unification of Estonia and northern Livonia with an autonomous self-government.

In early December, the Russian government began to react with force to what it described as "revolutionary excesses": martial law was declared in Reval and the Harrien County on 10 December; the Russian army and local Baltic German militias, known as Selbstschutz, began to scour cities and the countryside for participants in the 1905 revolution; and much of the local committee of the Russian Social Democratic Labour Party and Estonian intellectuals were arrested. In the governorate alone, 300 people were executed, 600 received some form of corporal punishment, and 500 were sentenced to hard labour in Siberia or elsewhere. Konstantin Päts and Jaan Teemant, the radical leader, fled to Finland and then to Western Europe; both had reasons to fear for their freedom.

=== World War I and path to independence ===
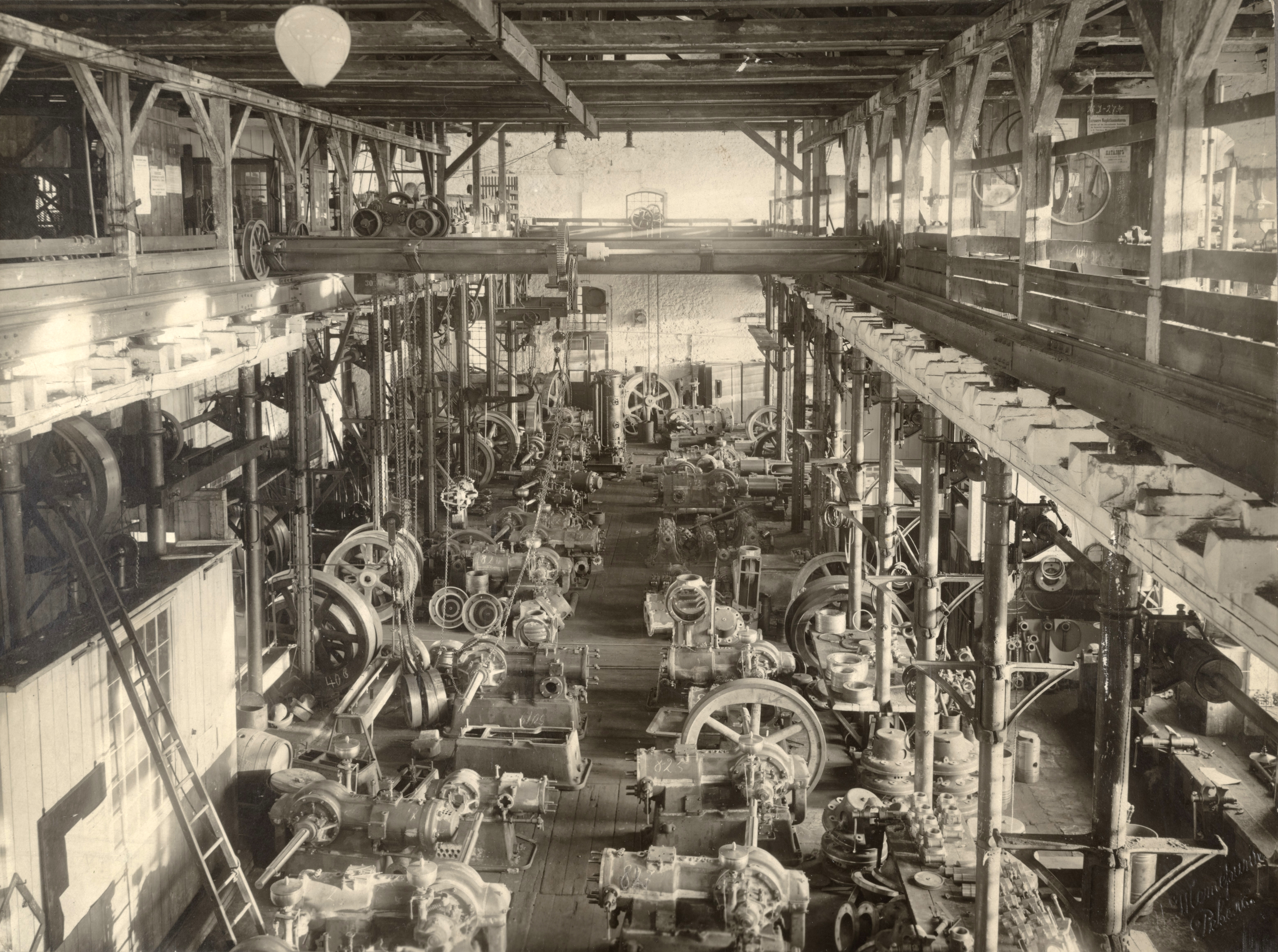
Mechanical workshop of the Friedrich Wigand plant in Reval, photographed in 1914

The outbreak of World War I was greeted by mixed reactions in the governorate. Within the Estonian population, there was some enthusiasm for a struggle against a historical enemy; for the Baltic Germans, however, it was unthinkable to fight against their co-nationals—the imperial Germans. Increasingly suspicious of possible collaboration with the imperial Germans, the Russian authorities closed down German schools and forbade using German in public. Restrictions were also included for using Estonian. About 100,000 men, nearly 10 percent of the Estonian population, were mobilised into the Russian Imperial Army; their extent of casualties is little known, and no reliable sources are available. The Estonians considered that fighting against foes—the Germans and the Austrians—was easy to transfer the enmity they felt towards the Baltic Germans, who were the representatives of the German-speaking cultural world; however, the Baltic German leadership also declared encouragement for Russia.

By the time the Russian Empire was crumbling, the Estonian desire for unification of the Estonian-speaking area, especially the entire Estonia and northern Livonia, had come into focus. Following the February Revolution in Russia, the Russian Provisional Government was proclaimed, and the clash on the Eastern Front was still ongoing. Seeing this moment as an opportunity to fulfil what they had wanted, Jaan Tõnisson and his moderate politicians lobbied the provisional government for changes in the northern Baltic area. In conjunction with a mass demonstration attended by 40,000 Estonians in Petrograd, the government agreed on 12 April [O.S. 30 March] to reorganise the self-government in the northern Baltic. The decree consisted of the merger of the governorate of Estonia with the northern counties of the governorate of Livonia—Dorpat, Fellin, Ösel, Pernau, Werro, and some portions of Walk—into the consolidated governorate, which accomplished what Carl Robert Jakobson had expressed, creating the autonomous polity known as "Estonia". The decree also established a temporary zemstvo with the provincial assembly as its head. In addition, Baltic German-controlled diets and imperial local administrative organs were dissolved.

In April, the provisional government appointed the Reval Mayor Jaan Poska as the first commissar, followed by, in May, elections of the provincial assembly known as Maapäev, in which political parties emerged on a broad basis for the first time, with the largest blocs being the Agrarian League and the Labour Party. The municipal elections in 1917, however, proved the significant fractionalisation of the political spectrum, as the configuration of party groupings was unstable. Predominantly, the moderates dominated the smaller urban areas, while the lefts dominated stronger in the larger industrial cities. In the early course, the soviets that emerged in Estonia were the Mensheviks and the Socialist Revolutionaries, who concentrated in major cities and military garrisons. Although permission of principle for the formation of national military units was granted in April, the Minister of War Alexander Kerensky restricted the establishment of a single regiment due to pressure from the Soviets. Nevertheless, the first Estonian regiment had grown to 8,000 men by the end of July, twice as large as originally intended, and the provisional government approved the formation of a second regiment in September.

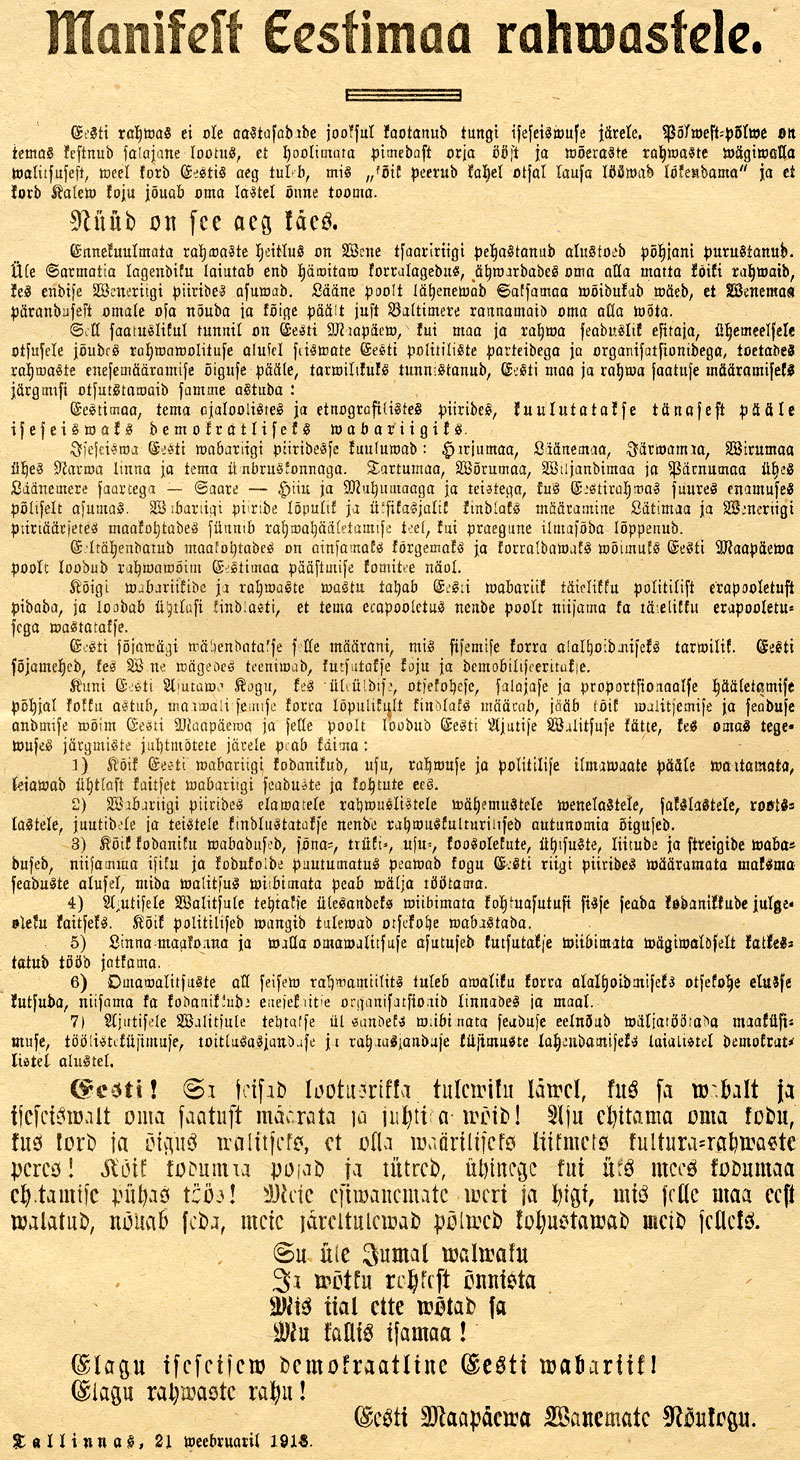
The Manifesto to the Peoples of Estonia, which declared Estonia an independent state, was issued on 24 February 1918

After the successful October Revolution in Petrograd, the Estonian Military Revolutionary Committee, led by Viktor Kingissepp, took power from the provisional government's commissar. The Bolsheviks were, however, unable to consolidate their power owing to the lack of Bolshevik officials who could replace the former government's public officials; the latter refused and launched the strike. The Estonian Bolsheviks had lost much of their popular support by the end of January 1918, engaging in the cancellation of the Estonian Constituent Assembly election held on 3–4 February [O.S. 21–22 January]. With the German advance in southern Livonia and Estonia and the Bolsheviks fleeing to Soviet Russia, the Estonian Provincial Assembly asserted Estonia "independent and democratic republic" within its "historical and ethnographical borders" on 24 February, with Konstantin Päts being the leader of the new provisional government. This was nonetheless a symbolic indication, and the Germans, on the following day, entered Reval.

== Geography ==
The Governorate of Estonia was the northernmost of the Baltic governorates, located on the southern shore of the Gulf of Finland. It was bordered with the Baltic Sea in the west, the Gulf of Finland in the north, the Saint Petersburg Governorate in the east, and the Governorate of Livonia and Lake Peipus in the south. The westernmost point was Cape Kalana in Hiiumaa; in the east, the Narva river near the city of Narva; Cape Stenskär in the north; Kõrksaar in the Pärnu Bay in the south. The land border was 297 versts (317 km; 197 mi) in the west, 469 versts (500 km; 311 mi) in the north, 75 versts (80 km; 50 mi) in the east with Saint Petersburg Governorate along the Narva, and 371 versts (396 km; 246 mi) with Lake Peipus and Governorate of Livonia in the south. The provincial border between Wierland and Dorpat counties was 20,377 fathoms (37.265 km; 23.156 mi) long, and between Wierland and Fellin counties was 18,669.3 fathoms (34.1424 km; 21.2151 mi) long.

Physically, the governorate was situated on the East European Plain, where the uplands and plateau structures were interspersed with lowlands and valley structures. It consisted of the limestone plateau, the northern part of which formed the North Estonian Klint. The highest areas were Pandivere and Jõhvi Uplands; the Pandivere was where the Emumägi, the highest point in the governorate, was located. In the west, the large area was entirely flat, forming the lowlands of West Estonia and the Moonsund archipelago. The scarps of the Ösel and Moon islands and those in the western continental area formed the Silurian Klint. Crystalline rocks formed in the lowest part of the basement; in the northeastern part, the crystalline rocks were 60–70 metres below the surface. Below the surface, the area also consisted of a large amount of phosphorite, especially in Wesenberg deposits, and kukersite oil shales within the Baltic Oil Shale Basin.

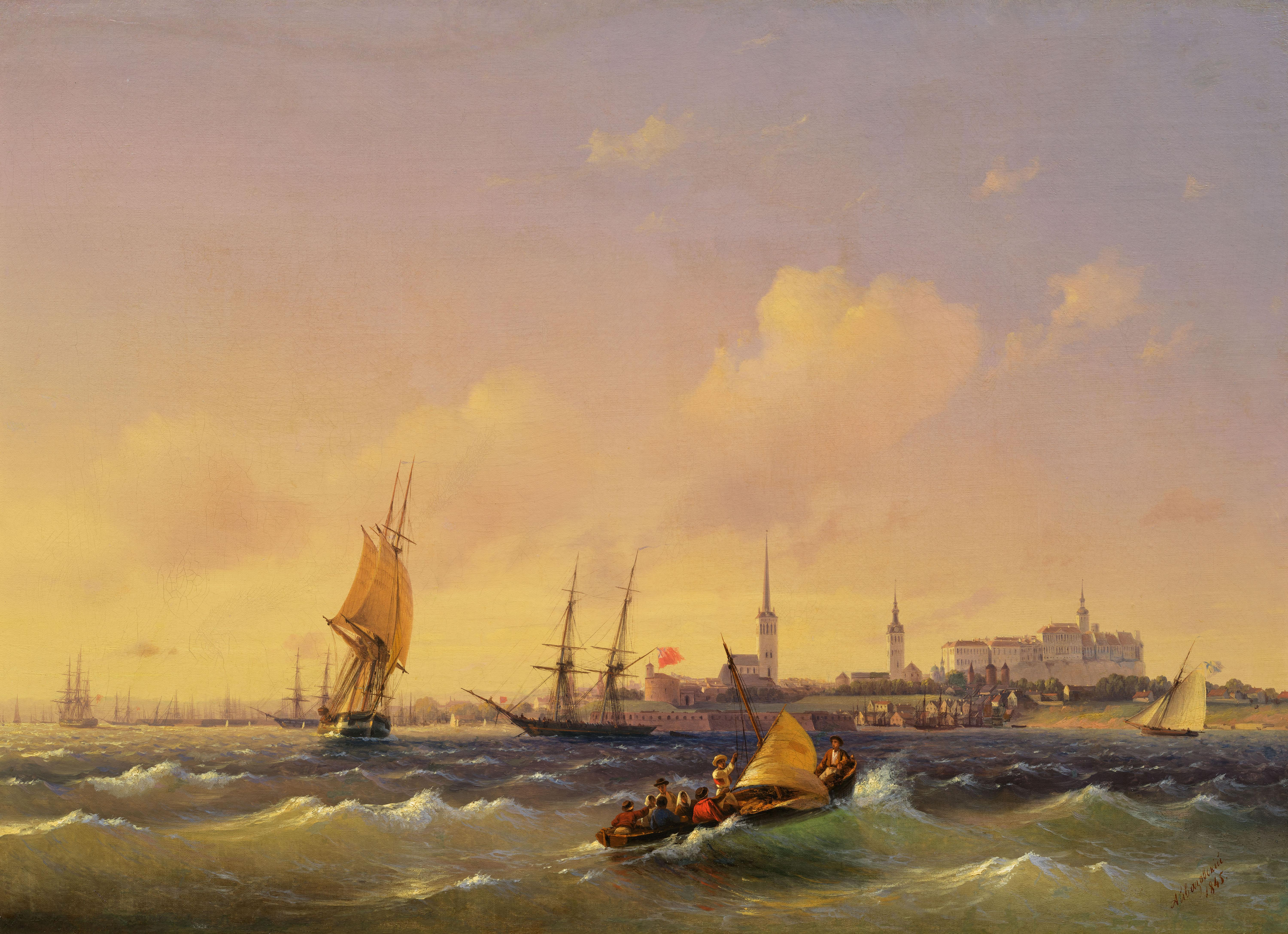
Painting of the port of Reval, by Ivan Aivazovsky in 1845

In the west, it is the location of the Moonsund archipelago, which was shared with the Governorate of Livonia. There are about 80 islands in the governorate, of which Dagö (known in modern times as Hiiumaa) was the largest, with an area of 989 square kilometres (382 mi^{2}). Other islands in the archipelago were Worms, Kassar, Groß Pakri and Klein Pakri, and Nargen.

The area of the Governorate of Estonia was 17,791.7 square versts (20,248.1 km^{2}; 7,817.8 mi^{2}); of this, 16,290.5 square versts (18,539.6 km^{2}; 7,158.2 mi^{2}) were the mainland and 1,032.7 square versts (1,175.3 km^{2}; 453.8 mi^{2}) were the islands, with 468.5 square versts (533.2 km^{2}; 205.9 mi^{2}) of Lake Peipsi as a part of the governorate.

The governorate consisted of the northern Estonia, approximately corresponding to: Harju, Lääne-Viru, Ida-Viru, Rapla, Järva, Lääne and Hiiu counties, and a small portion of Pärnu County.

== Administrative divisions ==
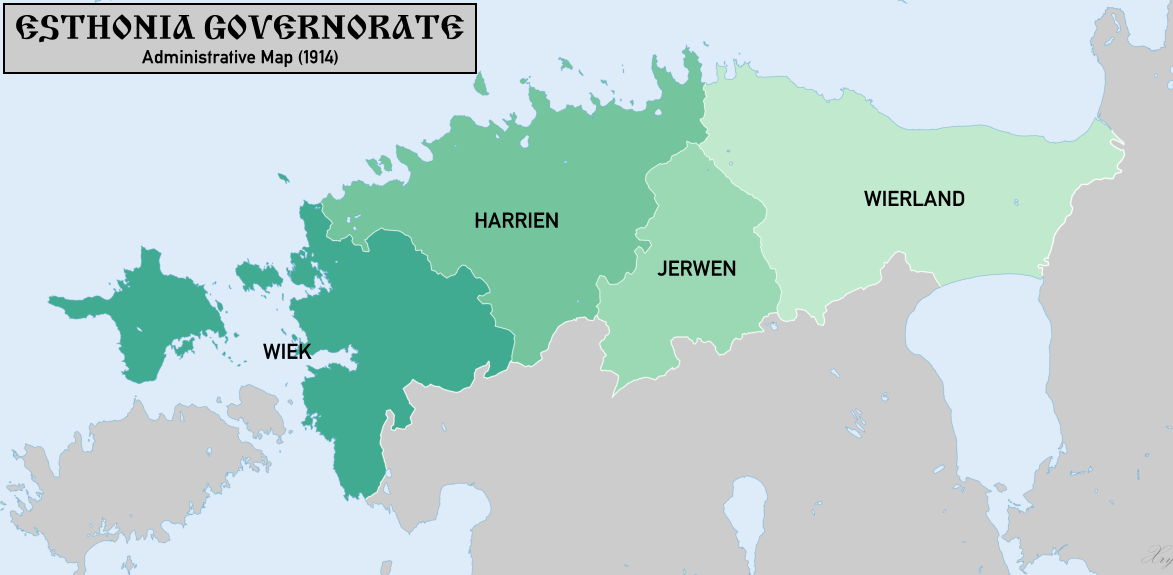
Administrative divisions of the Estonia Governorate

The districts (уѣзды, uezdy; German: Kreise) of the Governorate of Estonia in 1897 were as follow:

County		Administrative centre		Area	Population (1897 census)
Name in German	Name in Russian	Town	1897	Area	Population (1897 census)
Wierland	Везенбергскій/Вирляндскій	Wesenberg (Rakvere)	5,890	7,143.2 km^{2} (2,758.0 sq mi)	120,230
Jerwen	Вейсенштейнскій/Ервенскій	Weißenstein (Paide)	2,507	2,871.2 km^{2} (1,108.6 sq mi)	52,673
Wiek	Гапсальскій/Викскій	Hapsal (Haapsalu)	3,212	4,697.9 km^{2} (1,813.9 sq mi)	82,077
Harrien	Ревельскій/Гарріенскій	Reval (Tallinn)	64,572	5,739.5 km^{2} (2,216.0 sq mi)	157,736

=== Supernumerary towns ===
Town	Population	Part of
Baltiysky Port (Paldiski)	1,268	Harrien County

== Governors ==
- 1786–1797 Heinrich Johann Freiherr von Wrangell
- 1797–1808 Andreas von Langell
- 1808–1809 Duke Peter Friedrich Georg of Oldenburg
- 1809–1811 vacant
- 1811–1816 Duke Paul Friedrich August of Oldenburg
- 1816–1819 Berend Freiherr von Uexküll
- 1819–1832 Gotthard Wilhelm Freiherr von Budberg-Bönninghausen
- 1832–1833 Otto Wilhelm von Essen
- 1833–1841 Paul Friedrich von Benckendorff
- 1842–1859 Johann Christoph Engelbrecht von Grünewaldt
- 1859–1868 Wilhelm Otto Cornelius Alexander von Ulrich
- 1868–1870 Mikhail Nikolaiyevich Galkin-Vraskoy
- 1870–1875 Prince Mikhail Valentinovich Shakhovskoy-Glebov-Strezhnev
- 1875–1885 Viktor Petrovich Polivanov
- 1885–1894 Prince Sergey Vladimirovich Shakhovskoy
- 1894–1902 Yefstafiy Nikolaiyevich Skalon
- 1902–1905 Aleksey Valerianovich Bellegarde
- 16 March 1905 – October 1905 Aleksey Aleksandrovich Lopukhin
- 1905–1906 Nikolay Georgiyevich von Bünting
- 1906–1907 Pyotr Petrovich Bashilov
- 1907–1915 Izmail Vladimirovich Korostovets
- 1915–1917 Pyotr Vladimirovich Veryovkin

== Demographics ==
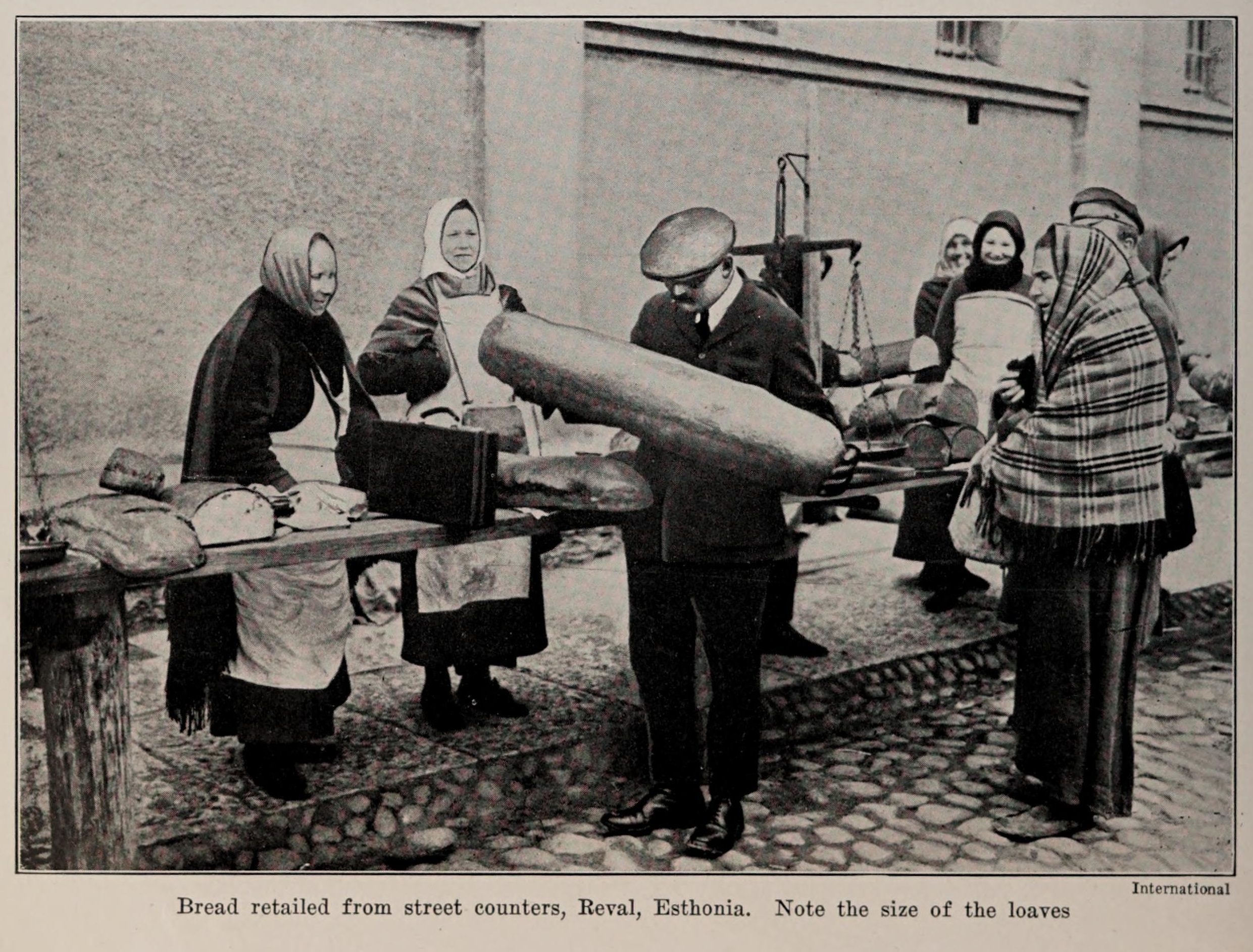
Bread retailed from street counters in Reval

Population of the Estonian Governorate
Year	Pop.	±%
1877	360,563	—
1878	364,094	+1.0%
1879	376,770	+3.5%
1880	371,571	−1.4%
1881	374,890	+0.9%
1882	377,688	+0.7%
1883	380,449	+0.7%
1884	388,484	+2.1%
1885	386,097	−0.6%
1886	388,690	+0.7%
1887	392,138	+0.9%
1897	412,716	+5.2%

The first general census in the Estonia Governorate, conducted in 1881, returned a population of 376,337, consisting of 184,323 men and 192,014 women. By 1887, the population was 393,983, increasing 17,646 over 6 years. The first-and-only organised nationwide census was conducted in 1897, which turned out a population of 412,716 on 9 February 1897 [O.S. 28 January], including 202,409 men and 210,307 women. The majority of the population indicated Estonian to be their mother tongue, with significant Russian and German speaking minorities.

The urban population of the governorate was 77,081, making up 18.68 per cent of the total population. The largest settlements included Reval (64,572), Wesenberg (5,890), Hapsal (3,212), and Weißenstein (2,507). Of the preceding cities, Estonian-speakers formed majorities.

Linguistic composition of the Estonia Governorate in 1897
Language	Males	Females	Native speakers	Percentage
Estonian	176,972	188,987	365,959	88.67
Great Russian (Note: Prior to 1918, the Imperial Russian Government classified Russians as the Great Russians, Ukrainians as the Little Russians, and Belarusians as the White Russians. After the creation of the Ukrainian People's and Belarusian Democratic Republics in 1918, the Little Russians and the White Russians identified themselves as "Ukrainians" and "Belarusians" respectively.)	12,441	7,998	20,439	4.95
German	6,991	9,046	16,037	3.88
Swedish	2,725	3,043	5,768	1.39
Jewish	852	417	1,261	0.31
Polish	921	316	1,237	0.30
Latvian	351	121	472	0.11
Finnish	271	91	362	0.09
White Russian	215	15	230	0.06
Little Russian	210	20	230	0.06
Norwegian	131	29	160	0.04
Other	329	224	553	0.13
TOTAL	202,409	210,307	412,716	100.00

=== Religion ===
Religious composition of the Estonia Governorate in 1881
Faith	Male	Female	Both	
Faith	Male	Female	Number	Percentage
Lutheran	170,403	183,972	354,375	94.16
Eastern Orthodox	11,904	6,665	18,569	4.93
Judaism	933	746	1,679	0.47
Roman Catholic	755	459	1,214	0.32
Anglican	136	22	158	0.04
Reformed	56	71	127	0.03
Brethren	2	5	7	0.00
Irvingian	1	0	1	0.00
Mennonite	0	1	1	0.00
Baptist	1	0	1	0.00
Mansfield's faith	1	0	1	0.00
Others	131	73	204	0.05
TOTAL	184,323	192,014	376,337	100.00

Religious composition of the Estonia Governorate in 1897
Faith	Male	Female	Both	
Faith	Male	Female	Number	Percentage
Lutheran	177,995	192,110	370,105	89.68
Eastern Orthodox	21,486	16,331	37,817	9.16
Roman Catholic	1,386	648	2,034	0.49
Judaism	920	483	1,403	0.34
Baptist	233	429	662	0.16
Old Believer	174	154	328	0.08
Anglican	52	29	81	0.02
Reformed	38	39	77	0.02
Karaite	2	0	2	0.00
Mennonite	1	0	1	0.00
Armenian Apostolic	1	0	1	0.00
Armenian Catholic	1	0	1	0.00
Other Christian denomination	60	69	129	0.03
Other non-Christian denomination	60	15	75	0.02
TOTAL	202,409	210,307	412,716	100.00

== See also ==
- Administrative divisions of Russia in 1719-1725
- Baltic governorates
