= Hans Einer =

Estonian teacher, author and public figure

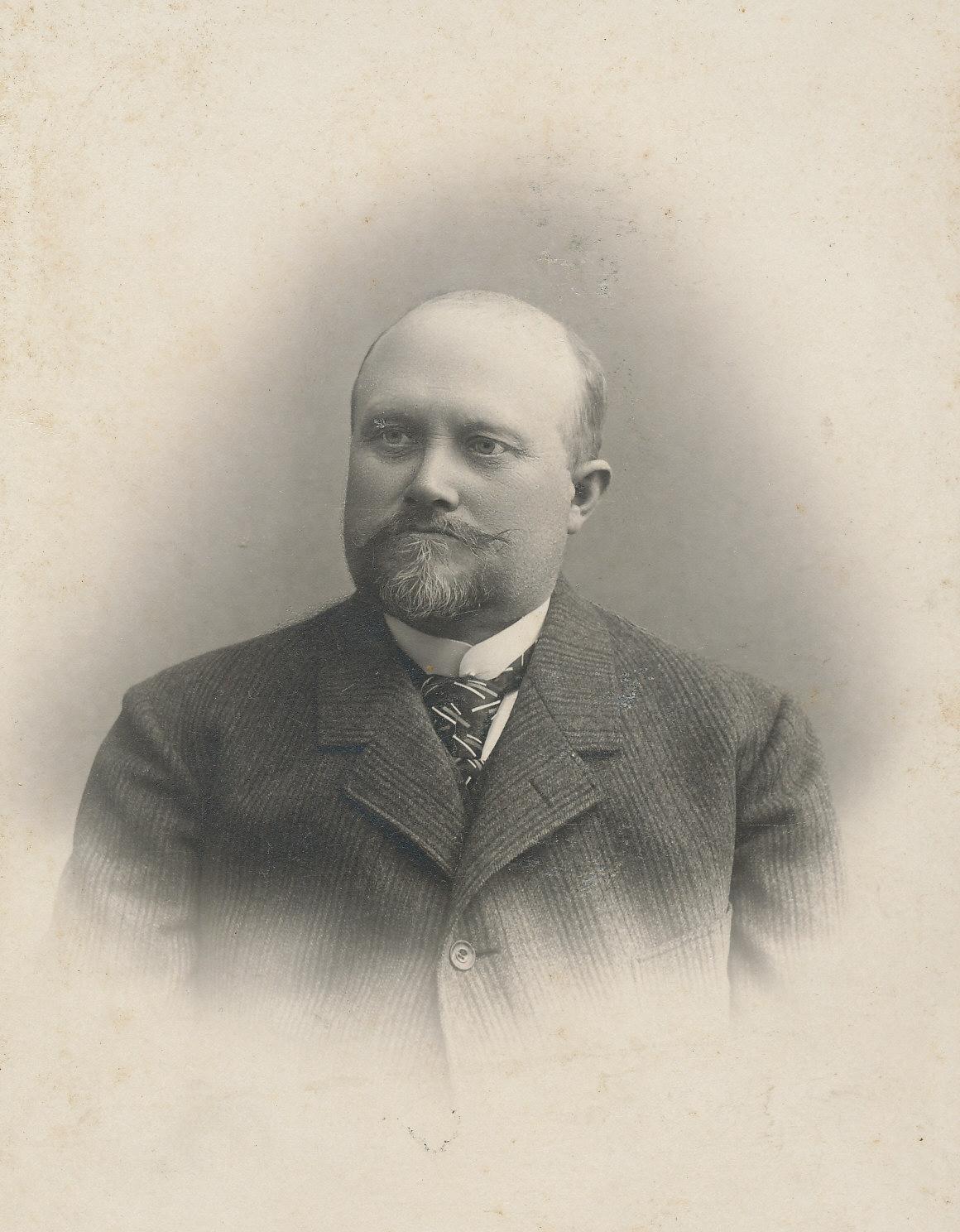
Hans Einer, Estonian teacher, an author of schoolbooks, cultural and public figure in Estonia.

Hans Einer (17 June 1856 – 23 February 1927) was born on the farm Kingu in Uniküla, Sangaste Parish (now Valga Parish), Kreis Dorpat. He taught Estonian, authored schoolbooks, and was a cultural and public figure in Estonia.

== Youth and education ==
Hans Einer was born on 17 June 1856 in Sangaste Parish (now Valga Parish) in the Kreis Dorpat of the Governorate of Livonia. He had already began reading at the age of seven, at home. His school years began at Uniküla Primary School, and after that he went to Sangaste Parish School, which he graduated successfully. Because his parents died very early, he was not able to continue his studies. Thanks to Unikula landlord, Balthasar Campenhausen, who paid for his studies (120 rubla per year), he could continue his education in Cimze Parish School Teachers' Seminary, which he graduated with a big success in 1878.

== Literary works ==
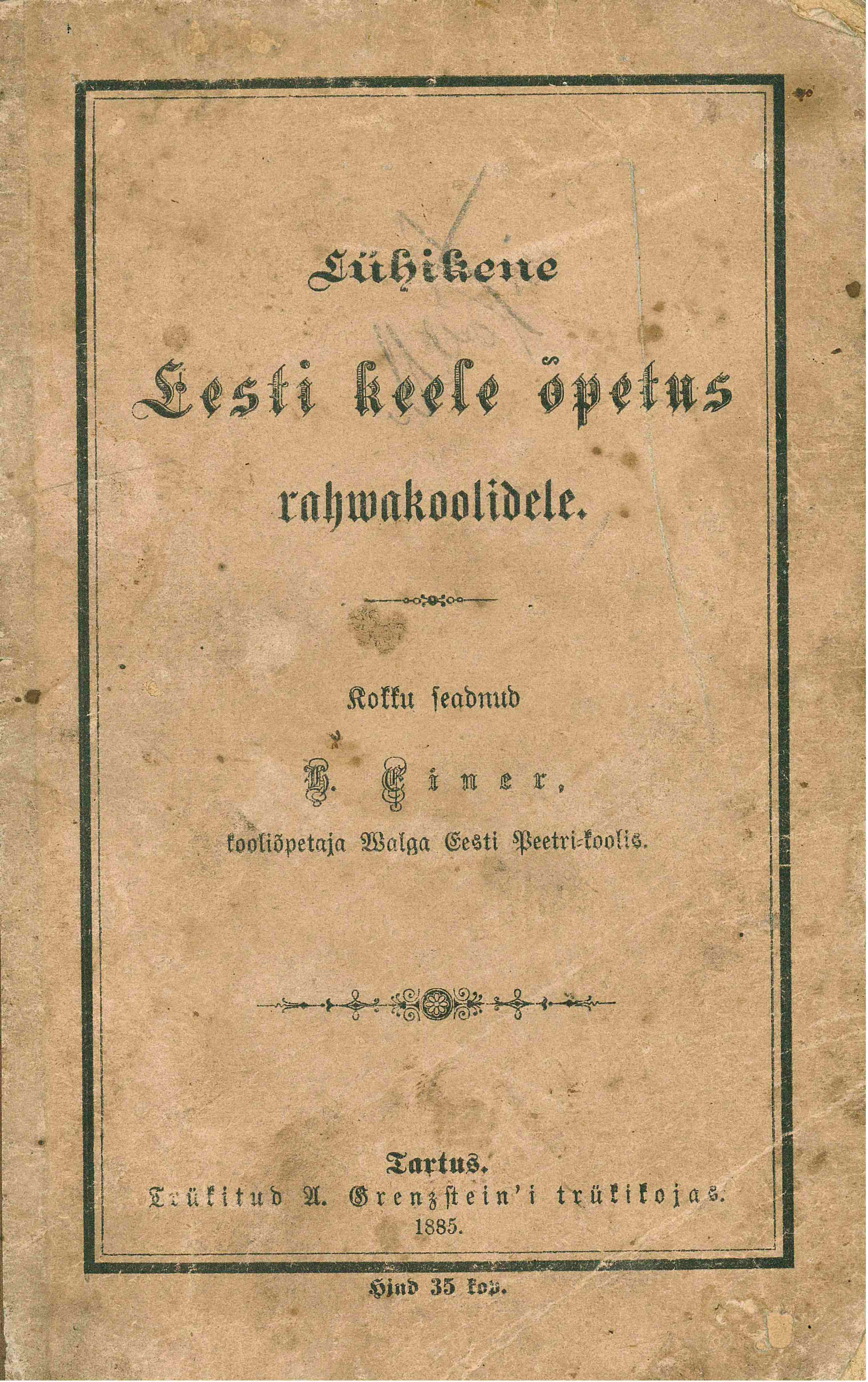
Short teaching of Estonian for folk schools, H. Einer, Tartu, 1885

Besides the teaching profession, Hans Einer had time for literary activities. He was a correspondent of several newspapers and wrote textbooks for schools. In 1885, his most compelling work was issued: Short teaching of Estonian for folk schools. The book had two reprints, Teaching Estonian grammar for schools and Teaching Estonian for schools, which were well received. Both books had eight reprints and were used in schools for nearly half a century.

== Working as a teacher ==
In 1878 after finishing Cimze Seminary Hans Einer started working as a teacher in Tori Parish School. In August 1880, the 24-year-old young man was chosen as a principal of Valga Peter's Church School. It was the first Estonian School in Valga. This school was soon named as Einer's School. The school was temporarily closed after 37 years in October 1917 due to economic difficulties. Three thousand Estonians received a primary education there. After the closing of this school, Hans Einer worked as a teacher in Cimze Seminary, Valga Town School, Valga Girls’ Gümnaasium and Valga Science School.

== Taking part in cultural and social life ==
Hans Einer took actively part in Valga cultural and social life.

- In 1881, with his guidance the first play in Estonian was performed in Valga (J. Kantswey “Mihkel and Liisa, or have a look, what greed can do with wealth”).
- In the same year (1881) Hans Einer founded the first Estonian choir in Valga.
- In 1891 Hans Einer was elected as the chairman of the first Estonian Society in Valga called the Association of Temperance Movement.
- In 1902 Hans Einer was elected as a board member of the newly established fellowship „Säde“.
- In 1903 Hans Einer was elected one of three directors of Säde Loan and Savings Bank (the other two were J. Märtson and T. Grünberg).
- In 1907 Hans Einer was elected as a board member of Estonian Literary Society.
- In 1917 for a short time was Hans Einer a mayor of Valga.
- In 1925 a young Valga County held the 1-st Valga County song festival. Hans Einer helped to organise it.

== Family ==
Hans Einer was married to Marie Koger, the daughter of Seeli's landlord. They had 8 children together. Hans Einer died on 23 February 1927 and was buried at Valka Luke Cemetery.
