= Uniküla, Valga County =

Village in Estonia

- Village
- Location within Estonia
- Coordinates: 57.920833333333°N 26.121944444444°E
- Country: Estonia
- County: Valga County
- Parish: Valga Parish
- Time zone: UTC+2 (EET)
  - Summer (DST): UTC+3 (EEST)

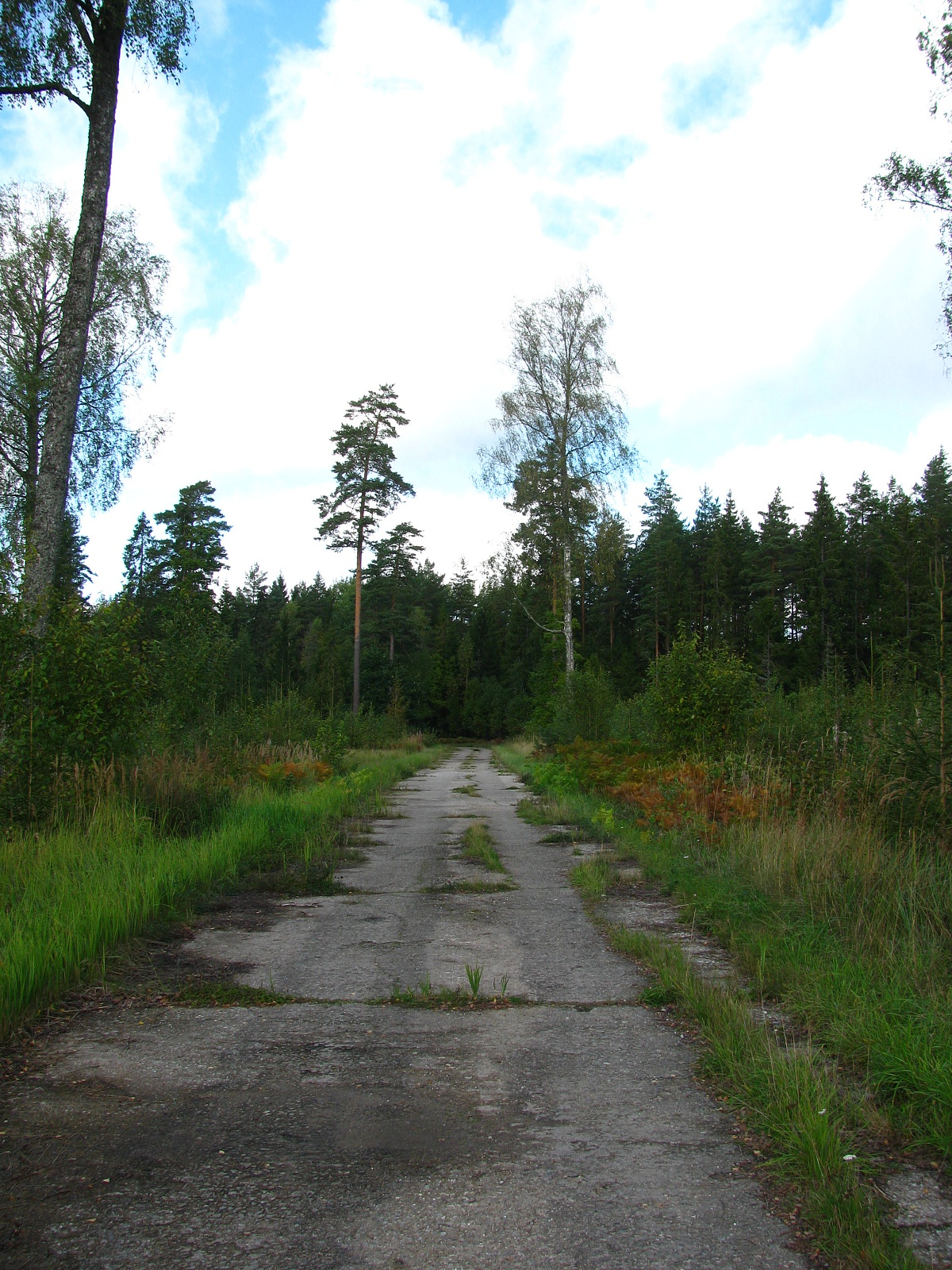
Uniküla

Uniküla is a village in Valga Parish, Valga County in Estonia.

== Notable people ==
- Friedrich Kuhlbars, poet
- Hans Einer, writer and teacher
