= Northern Estonia =

Geographic region in Estonia

Northern Estonia Põhja-Eesti
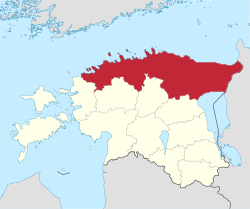
- Coordinates: 59°25′02″N 25°05′34″E
- Country: Estonia
- Capital: Tallinn, Rakvere, Jõhvi
- Counties (maakonnad): Harju; Lääne-Viru; Ida-Viru

Area
  - Total: 11,324 km^{2} (4,372 sq mi)

Population (2020)
  - Total: 798,150
  - Density: 70.483/km^{2} (182.55/sq mi)

GDP
  - Total: €24.311 billion (2022)
  - Per capita: €30,460 (2022)
- HDI (2019): 0.933 – very high · 1st

Northern Estonia (Estonian: Põhja-Eesti) is a geographical region of Estonia, consisting of the three northernmost counties - Harju County, Ida-Viru County and Lääne-Viru County. The largest towns of Northern Estonia are Tallinn (capital of Estonia), Narva, Kohtla-Järve and Rakvere. Northern Estonia is the most populous area in Estonia, with 60.3% of the population living there.

== History ==
Traditionally and at different times, the concept of North Estonia has also been different, encompassing in addition to Harju County and Lääne- Viru and Ida-Viru County also Järva County, Lääne County, present-day Rapla County and Hiiumaa.

During the Soviet occupation and annexation of Estonia some towns and villages like Narva, Jõhvi, Kohtla-Järve, Sillamäe, Maardu and Paldiski experienced almost total repopulation by Russiansand other Russian speakers and also new city districts that were meant to accommodate mostly Russians were built in Tallinn.

Estonians made up about 80% of Tallinn's population before World War II, but make up only 49% in 2019. In 2009, Estonians made up about 55,2% of Tallinn's population. The all time smallest share occurred in 1988 when only 47% of Tallinners were ethnic Estonians, not far from 2019. Tallinners made up about 29,7% of Estonia's population in 2009. In 2009, Tallinn's ethnic Estonian residents made up 23,9% (219,900) of all ethnic Estonians residing in Estonia. In 2009, Tallinn's non-Estonian residents, mainly Russians, made up 42,7% (178,694) of all non-Estonians residing in Estonia. The positive birth rate of ethnic Estonians and non-positive birth rate of non-Estonians should have increased the share of ethnic Estonians in Tallinn and whole Northern Estonia, but increased immigration mainly from other ex-soviet countries has on the contrary increased the share of non-Estonians.

Today Northern Estonia has two main ethnic groups: Estonians and Russians. Ida-Viru County, most notably, has a large Russian population. The population of Ida-Viru County is 72.8% Russian, unlike other Estonian counties, where 80% of the population is Estonian. Harju County also has a large Russian population (31.2%), and most of it resides in Tallinn. Lääne-Viru County, however, only has a 9.5% Russian population.

== Religion ==
In terms of religion, 23.4% of the residents older than fifteen years living in the municipality declared themselves Orthodox & Old Believers in the 2021 census, 6.0% declared themselves Lutheran 1.0% Roman Catholic, and 1.8% others Christians. The majority of residents of the area, 65.5% declared themselves religiously unaffiliated. 2.3 % of the population follows others religions.

Religious affiliations in Northern Estonia, census 2000–2021*
Religion	2000		2011		2021	
Religion	Number	%	Number	%	Number	%
Christianity	199,187	31.0	215,547	33,4	216,570	32.1
—Orthodox Christians	117,128	18.2	150,440	23.3	157,630	23.4
—Lutherans	68,487	10.6	51,149	7.9	40,090	6.0
—Catholics	4,378	0.7	3,525	0.5	6,410	1.0
—Baptists	3,144	0.5	2,322	0.3	2,490	0.3
—Jehovah's Witnesses	2,282	0.3	2,307	0.3	2,220	0.3
—Pentecostals	1,628	0.2	1,177	0.1	1,600	0.2
—Old Believers	400	0.06	685	0.1	510	0.07
—Methodists	940	0.1	762	0.1	940	0.1
—Adventists	800	0.2	612	0.09	510	0.07
—Other Christians	-	-	2568	0.3	4,170	0.6
Islam	1,229	0.1	1,304	0.2	5,340	0.8
Buddhism	-	-	711	0.1	1,250	0.1
Other religions**	4,371	0.6	4,989	0.7	7,920	1.1
No religion	248,181	38.6	304,868	47.3	351,520	52.2
Not stated***	97,893	15.2	116,906	18.1	89,540	13,2
Total population*	642,948		644,461		673,450	
*The censuses of Estonia count the religious affiliations of the population older than 15 years of age. ".

== Geography ==
Northern Estonia covers about a quarter of Estonia. It is located on the southern coast of the Gulf of Finland. The shoreline is characterized by many peninsulas, most of these are located in the westernmost part (Harjumaa). There are also numerous islands, largest are Naissaar, Aegna and Pakri Islands. The highest point in Northern Estonia is Emumägi (166m). The area is mainly covered by forests.

Ida-Viru County has large deposits of oil shale. Estonia has one of the largest deposits of oil shale in the world. In 2008, Estonia was the second largest producer of oil-shale products. In 2009, 80% of oil shale used globally was extracted in Estonia. In 2005, the oil-shale-fired Narva Power Plants accounted for 95% of the country's electrical generation.

== Languages ==
The most common language spoken in Northern Estonia is Estonian. Russian is the second most spoken language, mainly in Tallinn and Ida-Viru County. The northeastern coastal dialect is also spoken, the Middle Estonian dialect is sometimes spoken in Lääne-Viru County. The East Estonian dialect (similar to the Votic language) sometimes also reaches Ida-Viru County.
