= Emumägi Landscape Conservation Area =

Protected area in Estonia

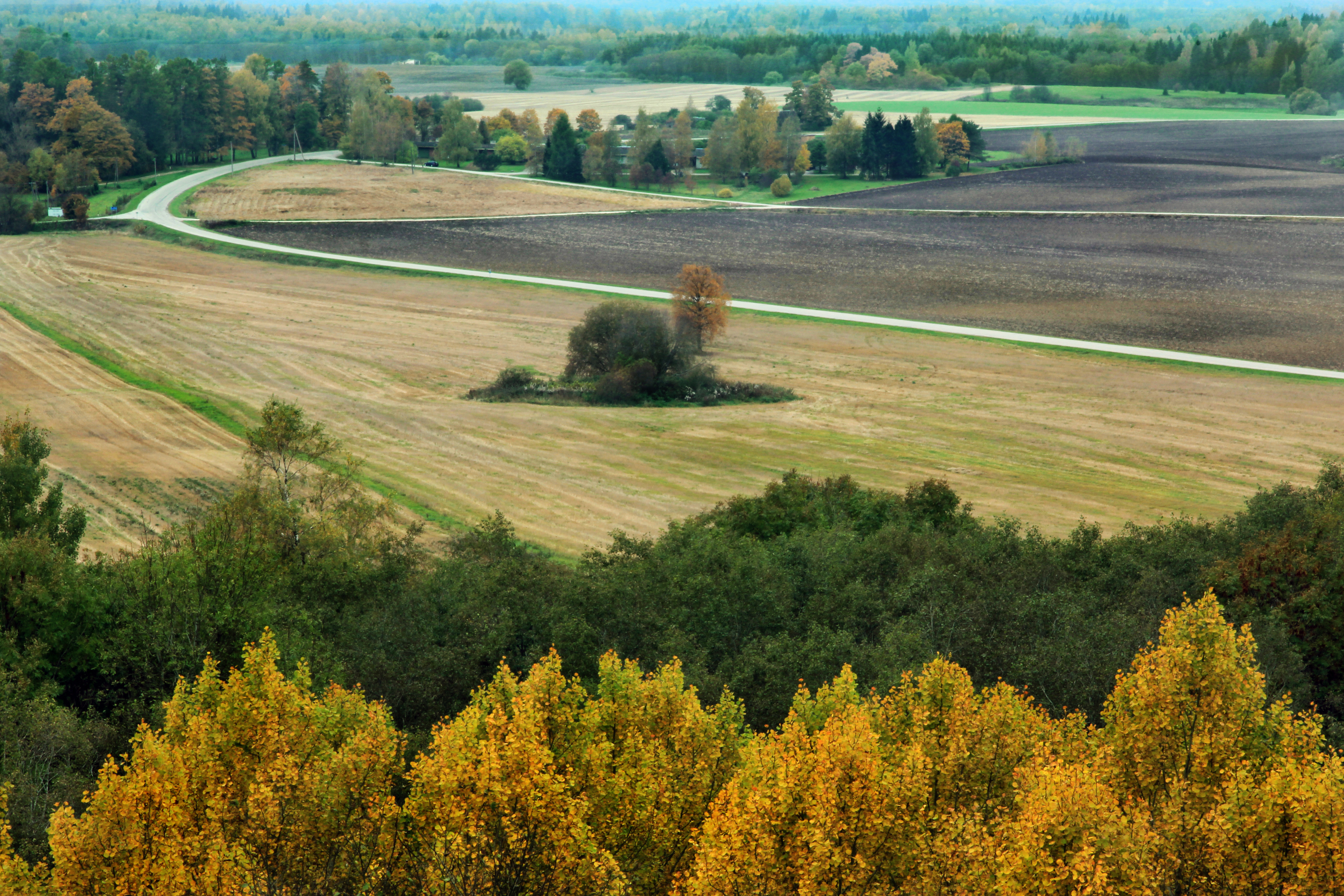

- Location within Estonia
- Location: Estonia
- Coordinates: 58°57′14″N 26°22′00″E
- Area: 5,390 ha (13,300 acres)
- Established: 1959 (1998)

Emumägi Landscape Conservation Area (Estonian: Emumäe maastikukaitseala) is a nature park in Lääne-Viru County, Estonia.

Its area is 510 ha.

The protected area was designated in 1959 to protect nature and landscapes of Väike-Maarja Raion (including Emumägi). In 1998, the protected area was redesigned to the landscape conservation area.
