= Otto Wilhelm von Essen =

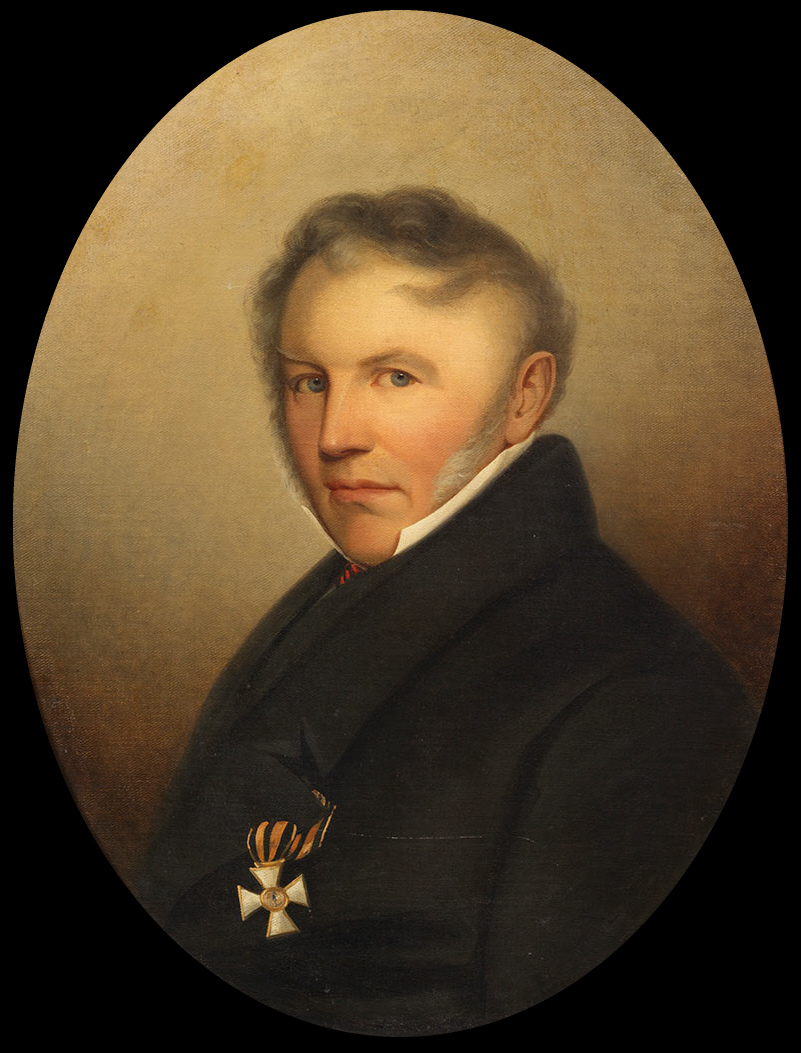
Otto Wilhelm von Essen

Otto Wilhelm von Essen (Russian: О́тто Васи́льевич фон Э́ссен; 19 April 1761– 9 June 1834) was a Baltic German in Russian Empire military service, also a statesman.

1832–1833 he was Governor of Governorate of Estonia.
