= Friedrich Kuhlbars =

Estonian poet

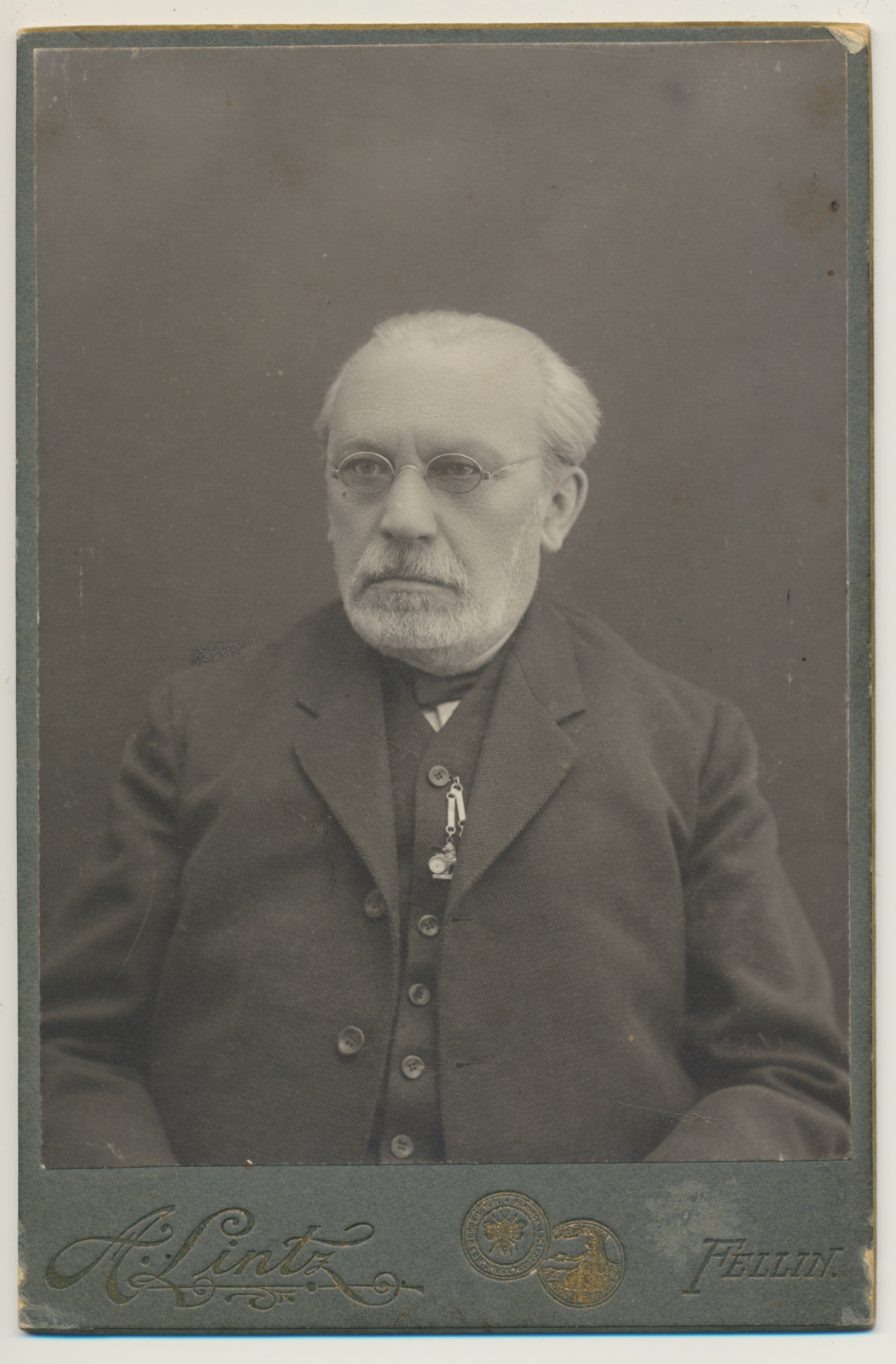
Kuhlbars in 1912

Friedrich Kuhlbars (pseudonym Villi Andi; 17 August 1843 Uniküla, Sangaste Parish (now Valga Parish), Kreis Dorpat – 28 January 1924 Viljandi) was an Estonian poet.

From 1859 to 1861, he studied at Tartu German Pedagogical College. From 1862 to 1895, he worked at the German language primary school for boys in Viljandi. He started there as the teacher and later become to the headmaster.

== Selected works ==
- 1868: poetry collection "Laulik koolis ja kodus" ('A Song Book for School and Home')
- 1871: poetry collection "Vanemuine ehk neljakordne laululõng" ('Vanemuine or Four-Ply Song Yarn')
- 1922–1924: poetry collection "Luuletused" ('Poems')
