= Emumägi =

Hill in Estonia

Coordinates: 58°56′15″N 26°22′27″E

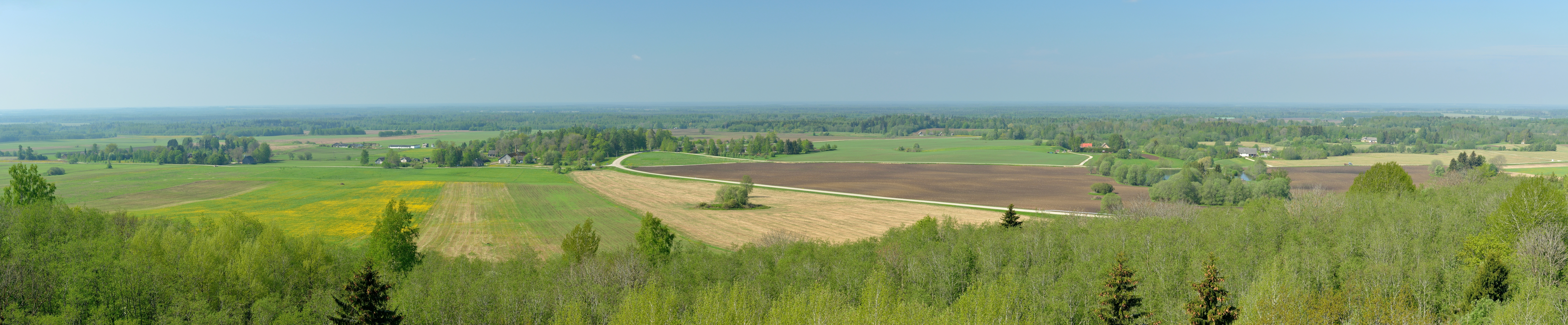
View from the watchtower

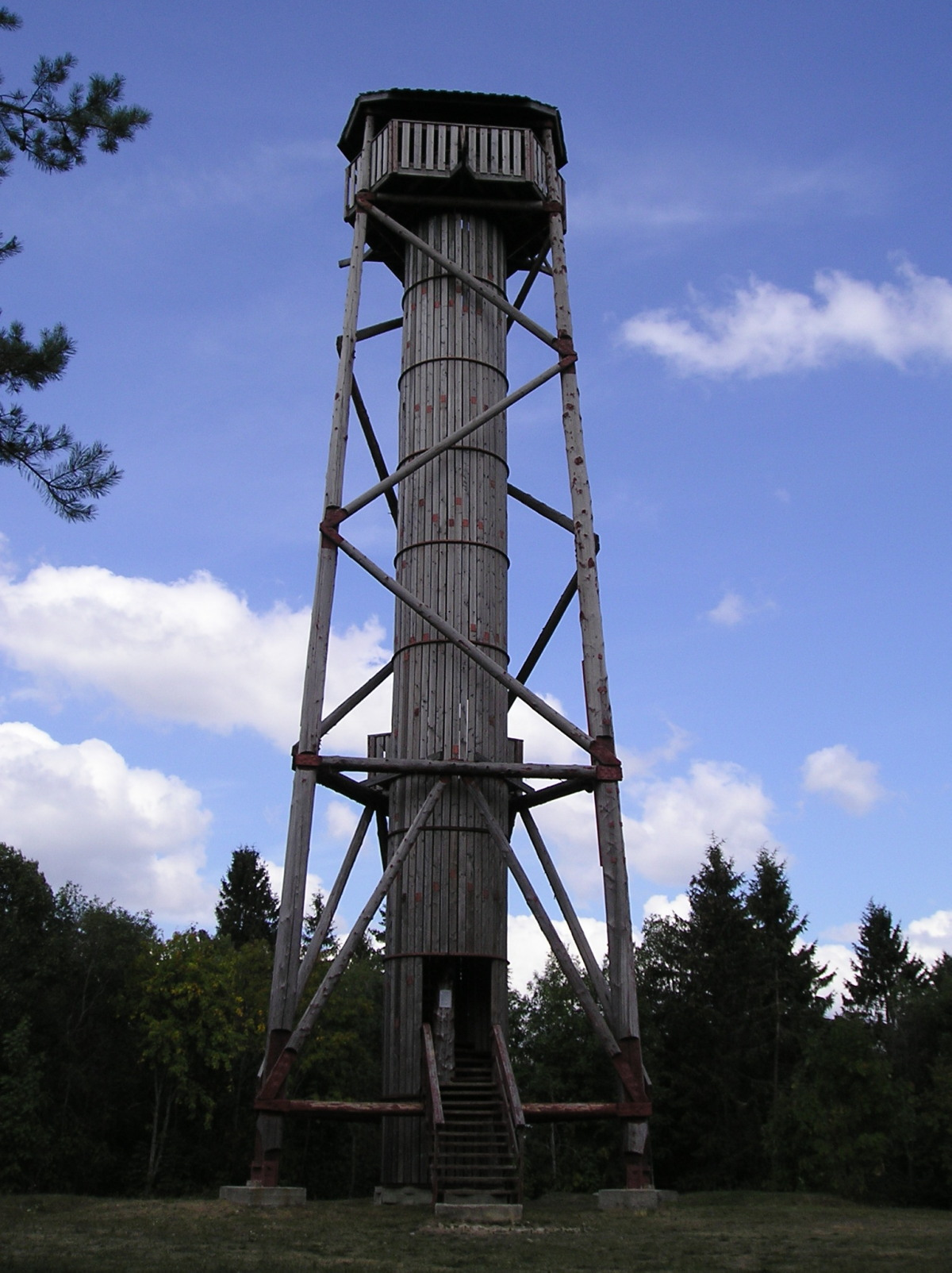
Watchtower

Emumägi is a hill in Väike-Maarja Parish, Lääne-Viru County, Estonia. The hill is the highest point in Northern Estonia. Its absolute height is 166.5 m and relative height is 80 m.

On top of the hill, there is a watchtower with a height of 21.5 m.

The Emumäe Landscape Conservation Area was declared to protect the hill and its vicinity.
