= Skalon =

Skalon is a Russian-language surname of French origin. Notable persons with the surname include:

- Georgi Skalon (1847-1914), a Russian Empire general
- Anton Skalon (1767-1812), Russian Empire general
- Vasily Skalon (1846 — 1907), Russian writer, journalist, and political activist
- Vasily N. Skalon (1903 - 1976), Russian ornithologist, zoologist and conservationist
