= Parmu Nature Reserve =

Protected area in Estonia

- Location within Estonia
- Location: Estonia
- Coordinates: 57°33′N 27°19′E
- Area: 990 ha (2,400 acres)
- Established: 2006 (2019)

Parmu Nature Reserve is a nature reserve located in Võru County, Estonia. Its area is 990 ha.

The protected area was founded in 2006 to protect valuable habitat types and threatened species in Kiviora, Muraski, Parmu, Pupli and Ritsiko village (all in Rõuge Parish).
