= Listaku =

Listaku may refer to several places in Estonia:

- Listaku, Rõuge Parish, village in Võru County, Estonia
- Listaku, Võru Parish, village in Võru County, Estonia
