= Soemõisa =

Village in Võru County, Estonia

- Village
- Location within Estonia
- Coordinates: 57.673888888889°N 26.932222222222°E
- Country: Estonia
- County: Võru County
- Parish: Rõuge Parish
- Time zone: UTC+2 (EET)
  - Summer (DST): UTC+3 (EEST)

Soemõisa is a village in Rõuge Parish, Võru County in Estonia.
