= Kokõmäe =

Village in Estonia

- Village
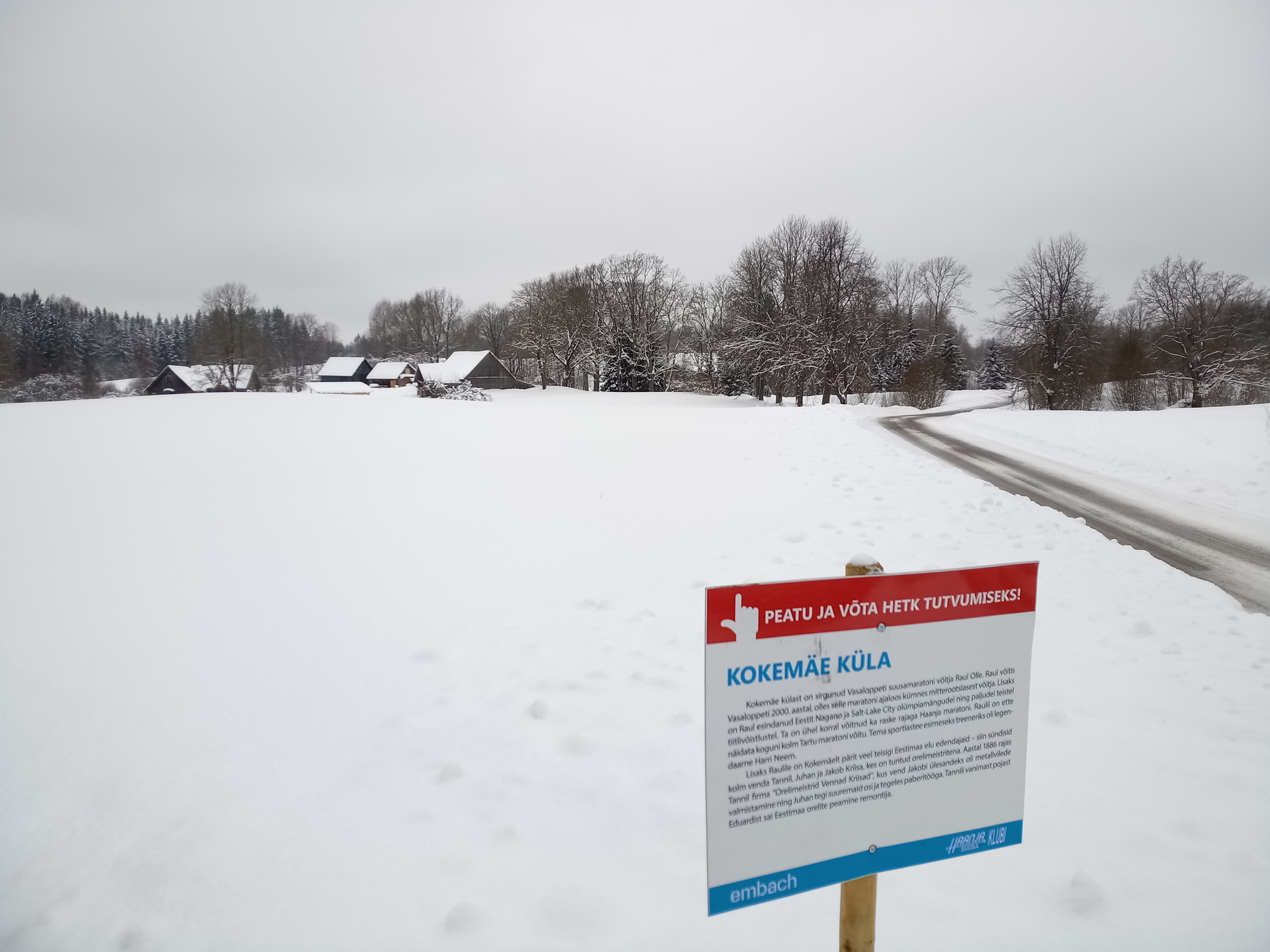

- Location within Estonia
- Coordinates: 57°42′49″N 27°0′4″E
- Country: Estonia
- County: Võru County
- Parish: Rõuge Parish
- Time zone: UTC+2 (EET)
  - Summer (DST): UTC+3 (EEST)

Kokõmäe is a village in Rõuge Parish, Võru County in southeastern Estonia.
