= Haabsilla =

Village in Estonia

- Village
- Location in Estonia
- Coordinates: 57°42′46″N 26°45′39″E
- Country: Estonia
- County: Võru County
- Municipality: Rõuge Parish

Haabsilla is a village in Rõuge Parish, Võru County in southeastern Estonia. The population has been 5 since 2021.
