= Kundsa =

Village in Estonia

- Village
- Location within Estonia
- Coordinates: 57.655555555556°N 27.300833333333°E
- Country: Estonia
- County: Võru County
- Parish: Rõuge Parish
- Time zone: UTC+2 (EET)
  - Summer (DST): UTC+3 (EEST)

Kundsa is a village in Rõuge Parish, Võru County in southeastern Estonia. It lies within a region known for its hilly terrain, dense forests, and proximity to the Latvian border. The village is part of the historical Võro-speaking area, and its surroundings reflect the traditional rural lifestyle of southern Estonia.

Although Kundsa is sparsely populated, it is situated within the administrative boundaries of Rõuge Parish, which was formed in 2017 through the merger of several smaller municipalities. The broader parish covers an area of 933 km^{2} and had a population of approximately 5,427 as of 2019.

Due to its remote location, Kundsa has remained largely untouched by urban development, making it a quiet and scenic spot for those interested in Estonia's natural landscapes and cultural heritage.
