= Soolätte =

Village in Estonia

- Village
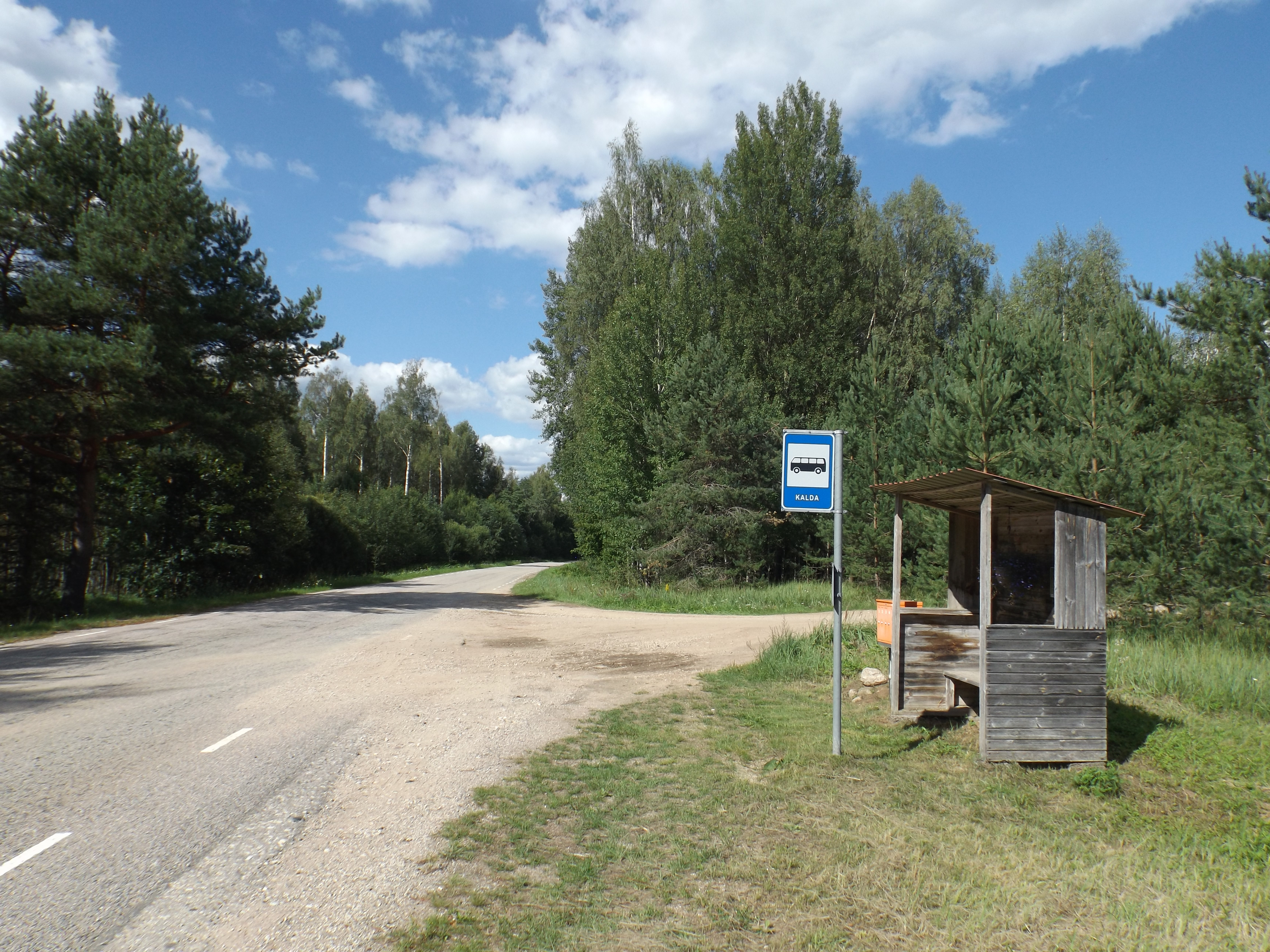
- Bus stop in Soolätte

- Location within Estonia
- Coordinates: 57°37′41″N 26°50′36″E
- Country: Estonia
- County: Võru County
- Parish: Rõuge Parish
- Time zone: UTC+2 (EET)
  - Summer (DST): UTC+3 (EEST)

Soolatte is a settlement in Rõuge Parish, Võru County in southeastern Estonia.
