= Taudsa =

Village in Estonia

Tautsa
- Location within Estonia
- Coordinates: 57°44′51″N 26°56′57″E
- Country: Estonia
- County: Võru County
- Time zone: UTC+2 (EET)

Tautsa is a settlement in Rõuge Parish, Võru County in southeastern Estonia.
