= Kaugu =

Village in Estonia

- Village
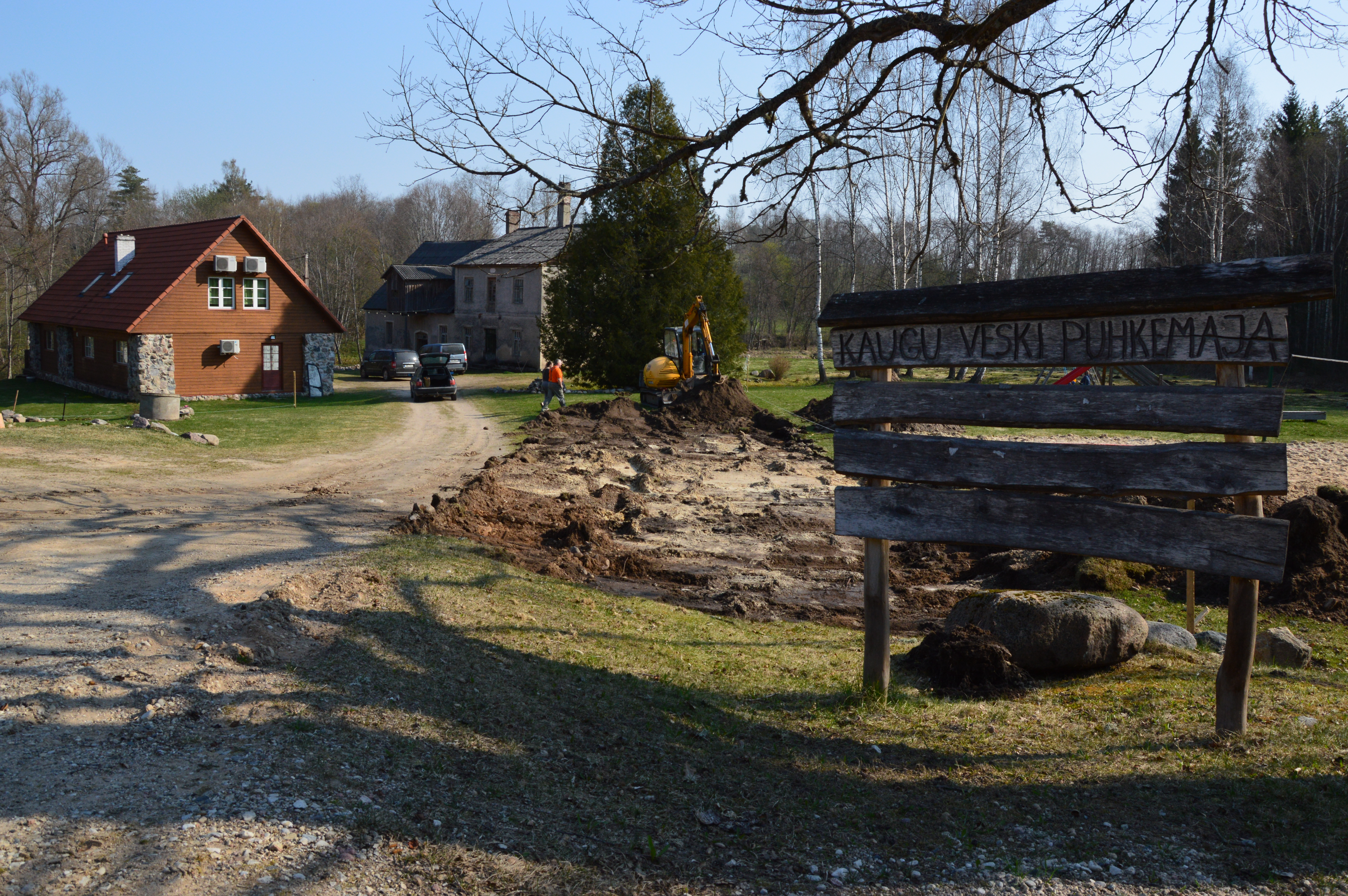
- Kaugu watermill

- Location within Estonia
- Coordinates: 57°43′26″N 26°48′14″E
- Country: Estonia
- County: Võru County
- Municipality: Rõuge Parish
- Time zone: UTC+2 (EET)

Kaugu is a village in Rõuge Parish, Võru County in southeastern Estonia.

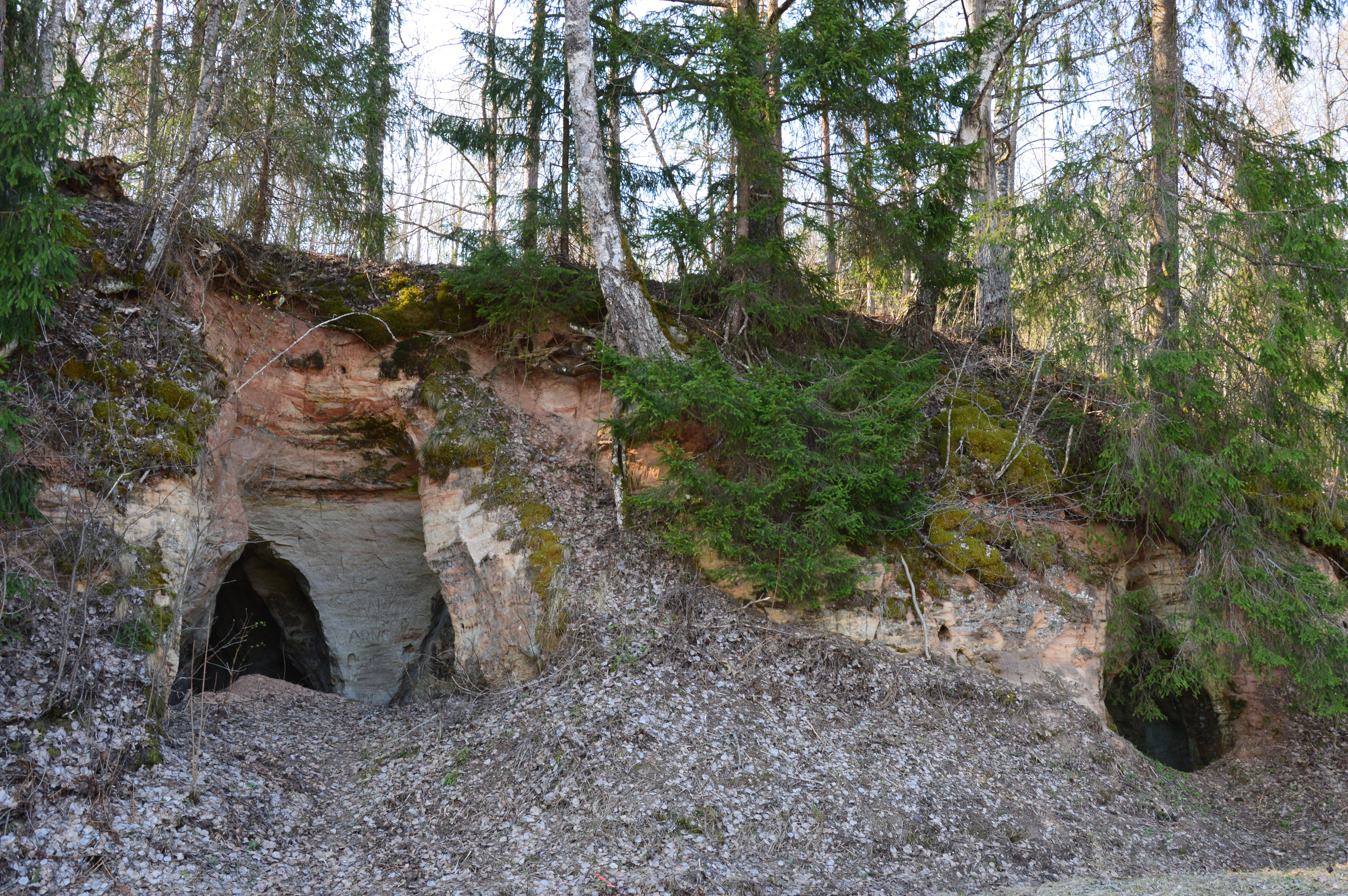
Kunnasilla Caves in Kaugu
