= Ahitsa =

Village in Võru County, Estonia

- Village
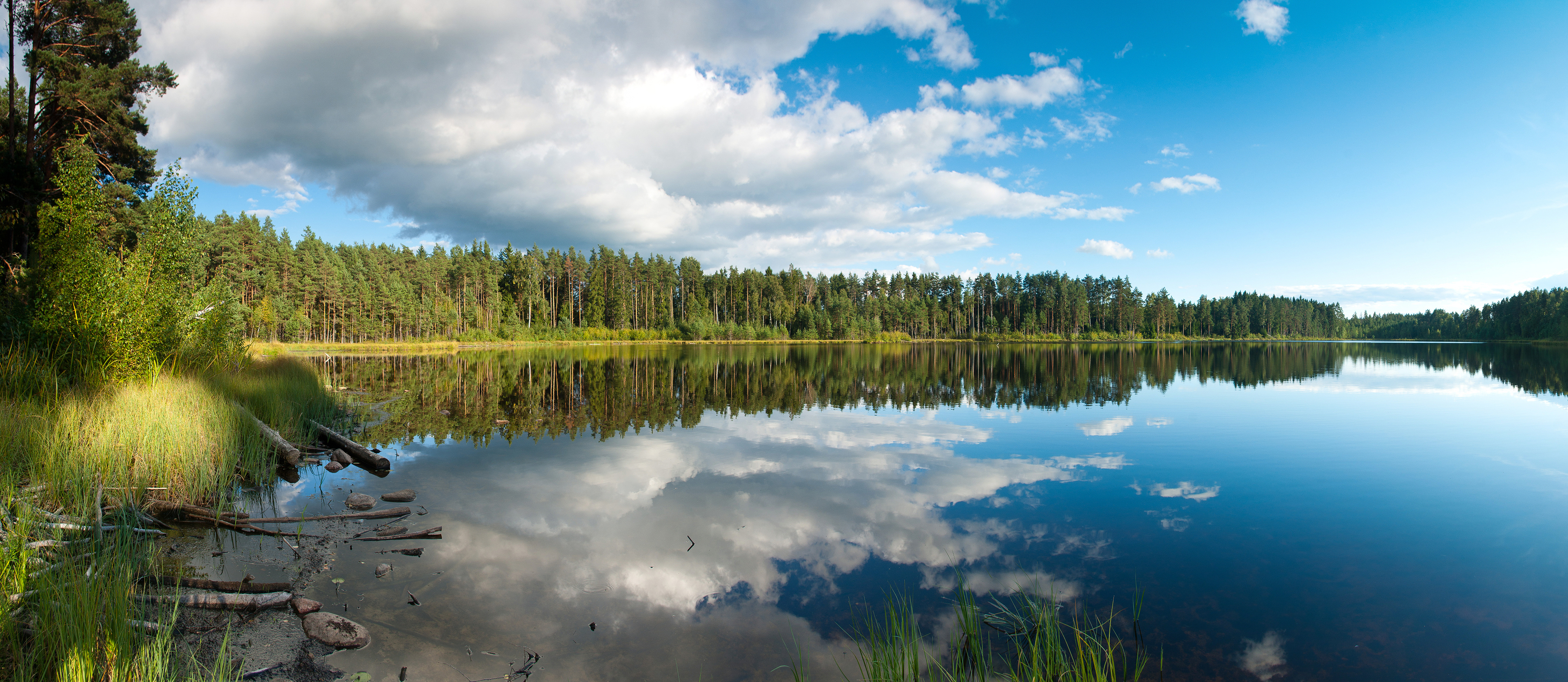
- Ahitsõ Lake

- Location in Estonia
- Coordinates: 57°45′07″N 26°50′38″E
- Country: Estonia
- County: Võru County
- Municipality: Rõuge Parish

Ahitsa (also Ahitsõ) is an unpopulated village in Rõuge Parish, Võru County in southeastern Estonia. The village has been unpopulated since 2011.
