= Ala-Suhka =

Village in Estonia

Coordinates: 57°41′07″N 27°08′03″E

- Village
- Interactive map of Ala-Suhka
- Country: Estonia
- County: Võru County
- Parish: Rõuge Parish
- Time zone: UTC+2 (EET)
  - Summer (DST): UTC+3 (EEST)

Ala-Suhka is a village in Rõuge Parish, Võru County in southeastern Estonia. The population has been 2 in 2011.

In 2021, there is no population.
