= Ala-Palo =

Village in Võru County, Estonia

- Village
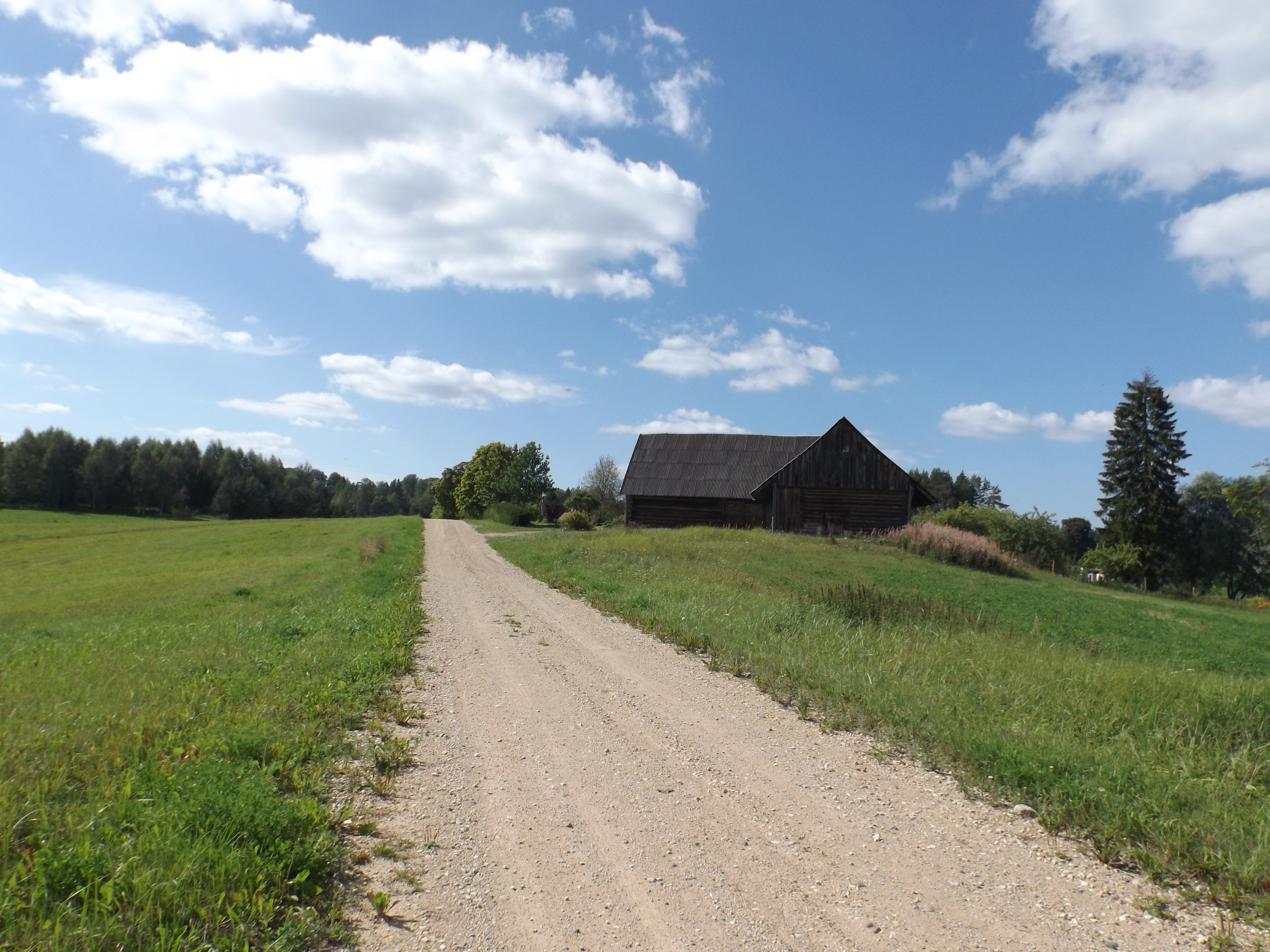
- Road in Ala-Palo

- Location in Estonia
- Coordinates: 57°36′44″N 27°06′38″E
- Country: Estonia
- County: Võru County
- Municipality: Rõuge Parish

Population (2021)
  - Total: 3

Ala-Palo is a village in Rõuge Parish, Võru County in southeastern Estonia. As of 2021, the village has 3 inhabitants.
