= Muhkamõtsa =

Village in Estonia

- Location within Estonia
- Coordinates: 57°43′48″N 26°51′36″E
- Country: Estonia
- County: Võru County
- Time zone: UTC+2 (EET)

Muhkamõtsa is a settlement in Rõuge Parish, Võru County in southeastern Estonia.
