= Riitsilla =

Village in Estonia

- Village
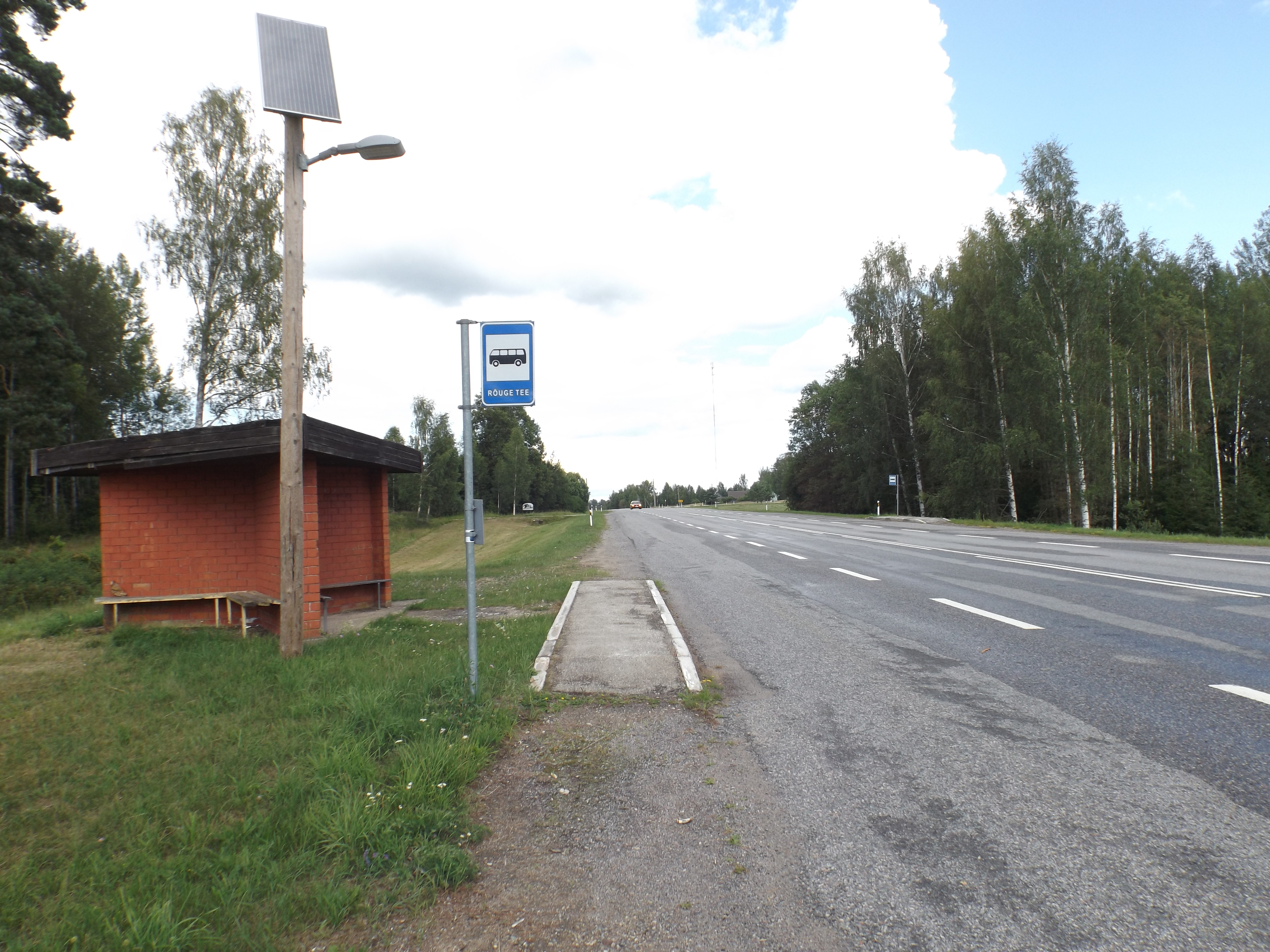
- Bus stop in Riitsilla on the Võru-Mõniste-Valga road

- Location within Estonia
- Coordinates: 57°43′19″N 26°46′32″E
- Country: Estonia
- County: Võru County
- Time zone: UTC+2 (EET)

Riitsilla is a settlement in Rõuge Parish, Võru County in southeastern Estonia.
