= Pärlijõe =

Village in Estonia

- Location within Estonia
- Coordinates: 57°39′57″N 26°52′54″E
- Country: Estonia
- County: Võru County
- Time zone: UTC+2 (EET)

Pärlijõe is a settlement in Rõuge Parish, Võru County in southeastern Estonia.
