= Heibri =

Village in Estonia

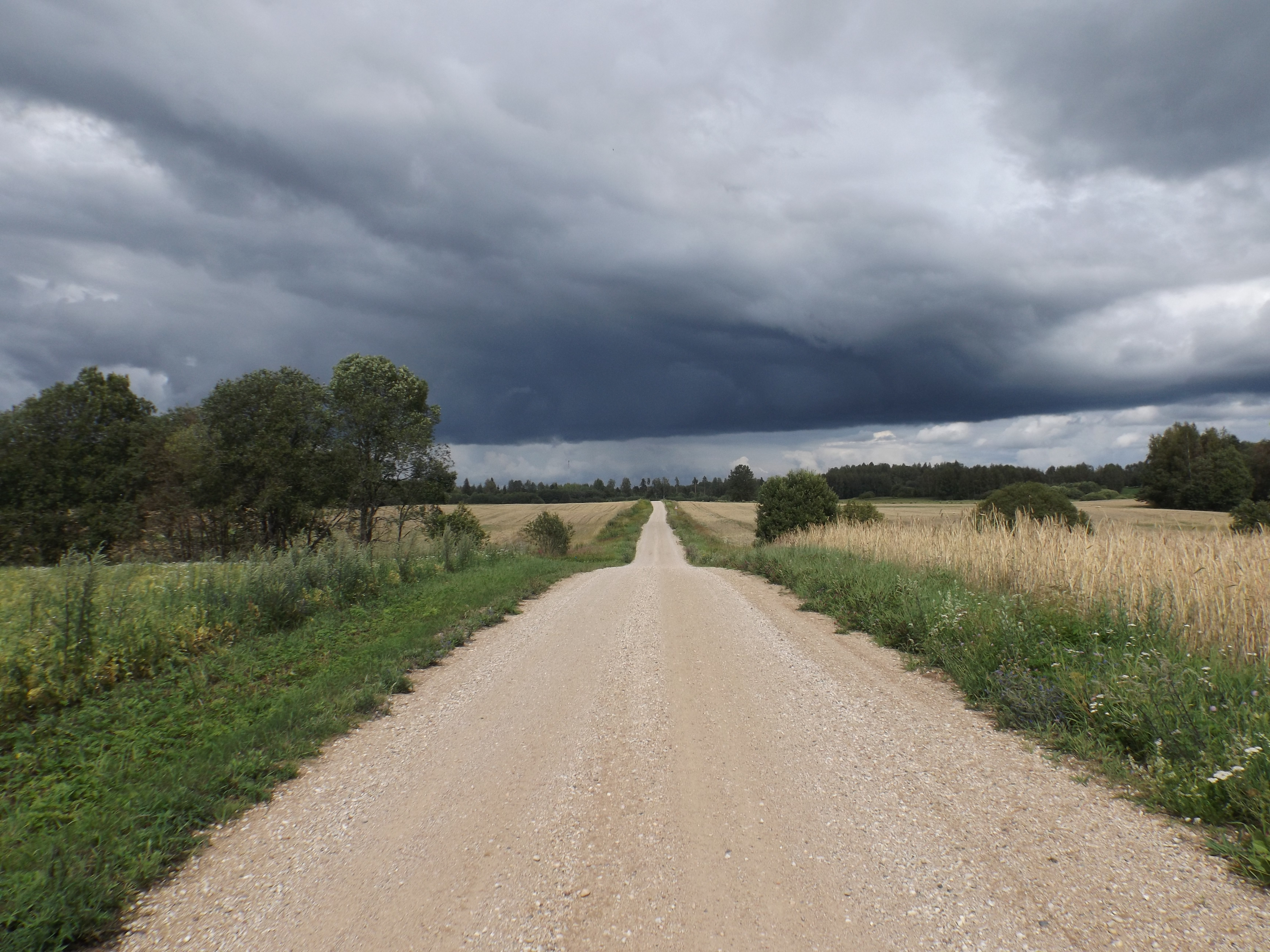
- Road through Heibri

- Location within Estonia
- Coordinates: 57°41′57″N 26°55′4″E
- Country: Estonia
- County: Võru County
- Time zone: UTC+2 (EET)

Heibri is a settlement in Rõuge Parish, Võru County in southeastern Estonia.
