= Rasva =

Village in Estonia

- Location within Estonia
- Coordinates: 57°44′50″N 26°59′32″E
- Country: Estonia
- County: Võru County
- Time zone: UTC+2 (EET)

Rasva is a settlement in Rõuge Parish, Võru County in southeastern Estonia.
