= Hotõmäe =

Village in Estonia

- Village
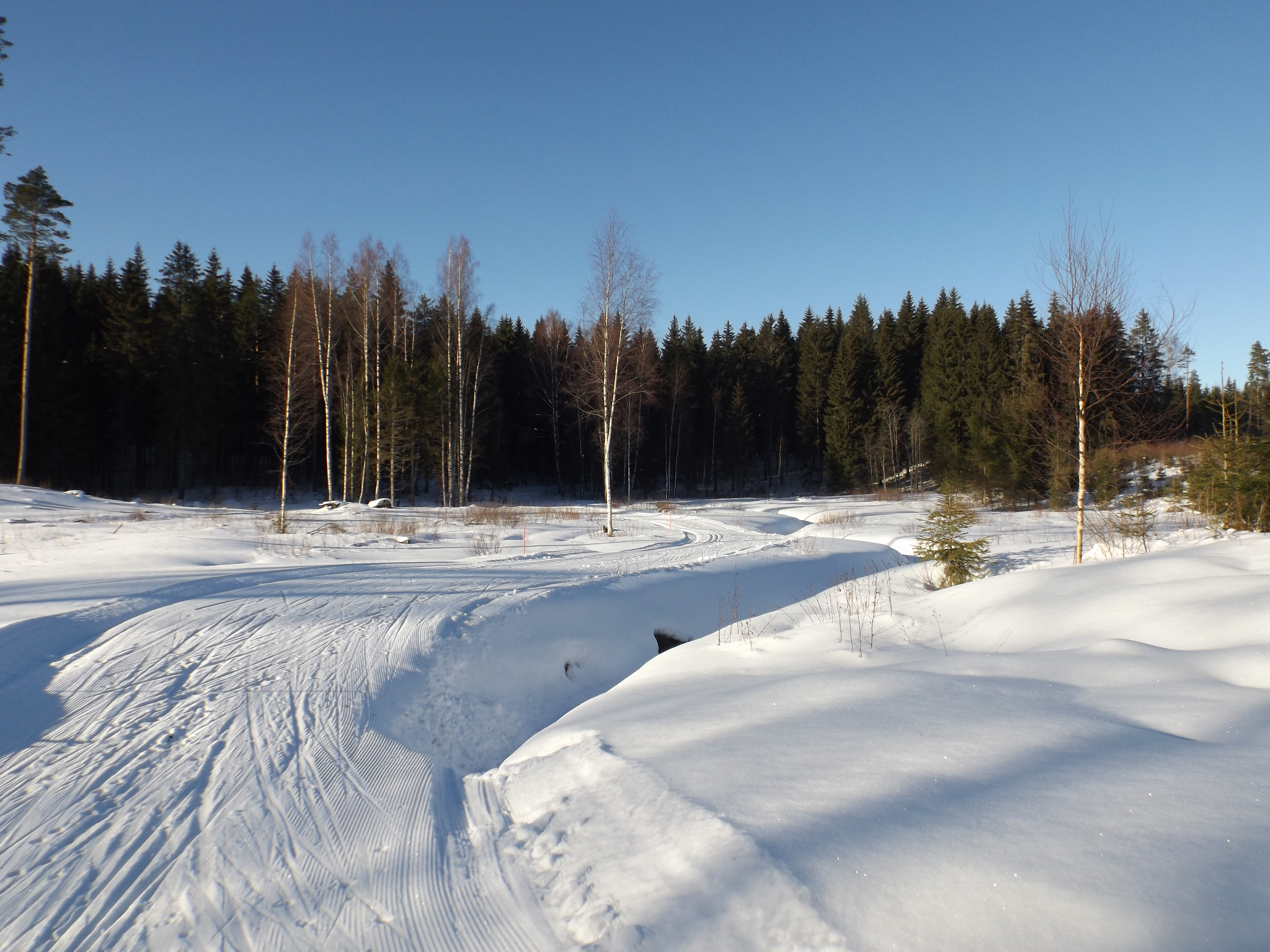
- Haanja ski marathon track in Hotõmäe

- Location within Estonia
- Coordinates: 57.701666666667°N 26.996944444444°E
- Country: Estonia
- County: Võru County
- Parish: Rõuge Parish
- Time zone: UTC+2 (EET)
  - Summer (DST): UTC+3 (EEST)

Hotõmäe is a village in Rõuge Parish, Võru County in Estonia.
