= Kurvitsa =

Village in Estonia

- Village
- Location within Estonia
- Coordinates: 57.742222222222°N 26.812222222222°E
- Country: Estonia
- County: Võru County
- Parish: Rõuge Parish
- Time zone: UTC+2 (EET)
  - Summer (DST): UTC+3 (EEST)

Kurvitsa is a village in Rõuge Parish, Võru County in Estonia.
