= Jugu, Estonia =

Village in Estonia

Jugumetsa
- Village
- Location within Estonia
- Coordinates: 57.682777777778°N 26.971944444444°E
- Country: Estonia
- County: Võru County
- Parish: Rõuge Parish
- Time zone: UTC+2 (EET)
  - Summer (DST): UTC+3 (EEST)

Jugu, or Jugumetsa, is a village in Rõuge Parish, Võru County in Estonia. It was formerly in the Haanja Parish prior to its merge with Rõuge.
