= Augli =

Village in Võru County, Estonia

- Village
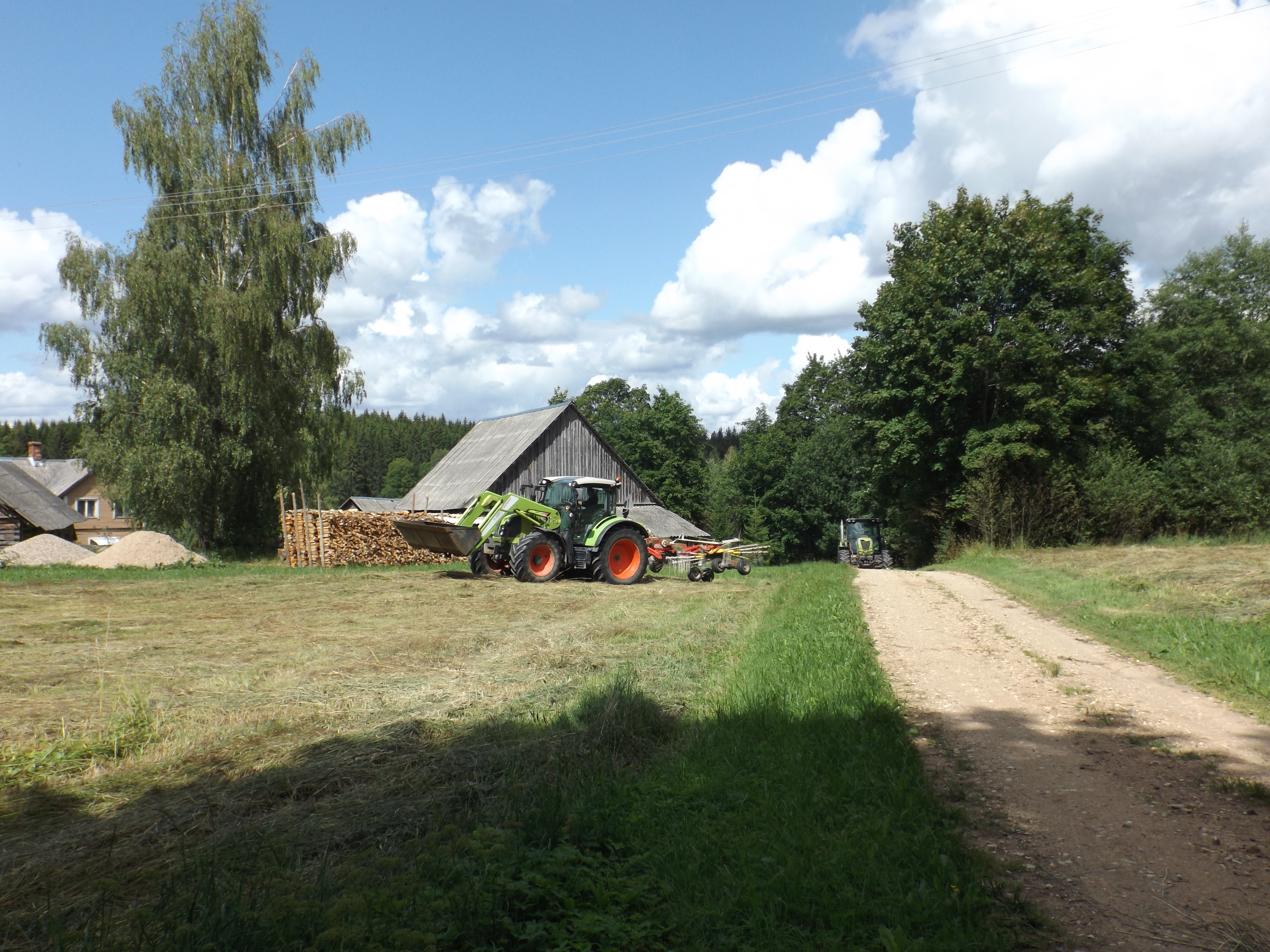
- Farming in Augli

- Location in Estonia
- Coordinates: 57°43′01″N 26°57′44″E
- Country: Estonia
- County: Võru County
- Municipality: Rõuge Parish

Population (2021)
  - Total: 15

Augli is a village in Rõuge Parish, Võru County in southeastern Estonia. The population has been 15 since 2021.
