= Väiku-Ruuga =

Village in Estonia

- Location within Estonia
- Coordinates: 57°43′12″N 26°54′36″E
- Country: Estonia
- County: Võru County
- Time zone: UTC+2 (EET)

Väiku-Ruuga is a settlement in Rõuge Parish, Võru County in southeastern Estonia.
