= Hinsa =

Village in Estonia

- Location within Estonia
- Coordinates: 57°45′59″N 27°12′16″E
- Country: Estonia
- County: Võru County
- Time zone: UTC+2 (EET)

Hinsa is a village in Rõuge Parish, Võru County in southeastern Estonia.
