= Listaku, Rõuge Parish =

Village in Estonia

Listaku
- Village
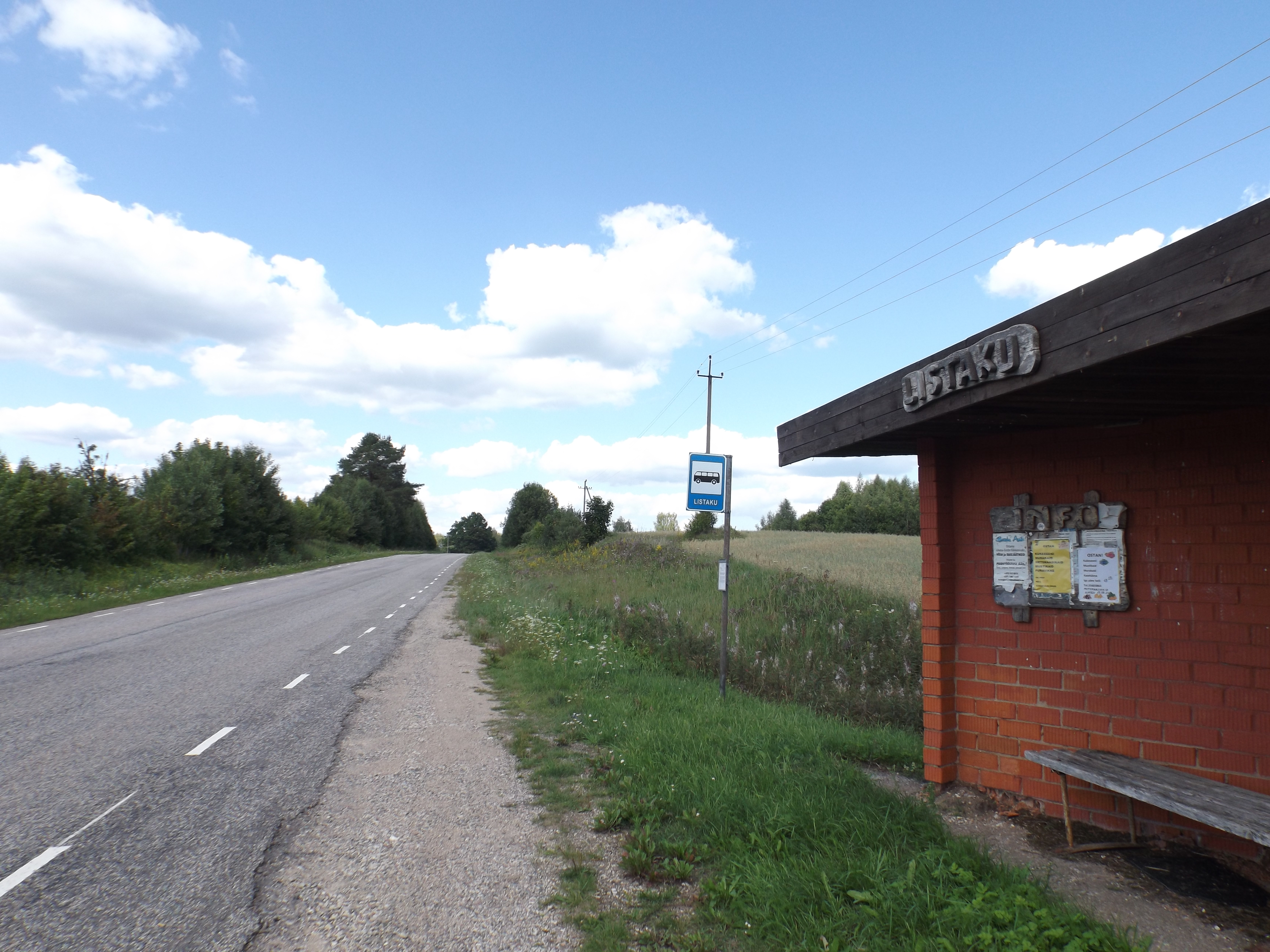
- Listaku bus stop

- Location within Estonia
- Coordinates: 57.6497°N 26.8478°E
- Country: Estonia
- County: Võru County
- Parish: Rõuge Parish
- Time zone: UTC+2 (EET)
  - Summer (DST): UTC+3 (EEST)

Listaku is a village in Rõuge Parish, Võru County in Estonia.
