= Rõuge Parish =

Municipality of Estonia (2017)

Coordinates: 57°43′39″N 26°54′53″E

Rõuge Parish Rõuge vald (in Estonian) Rõugõ vald (in Võro)
- Municipality of Estonia
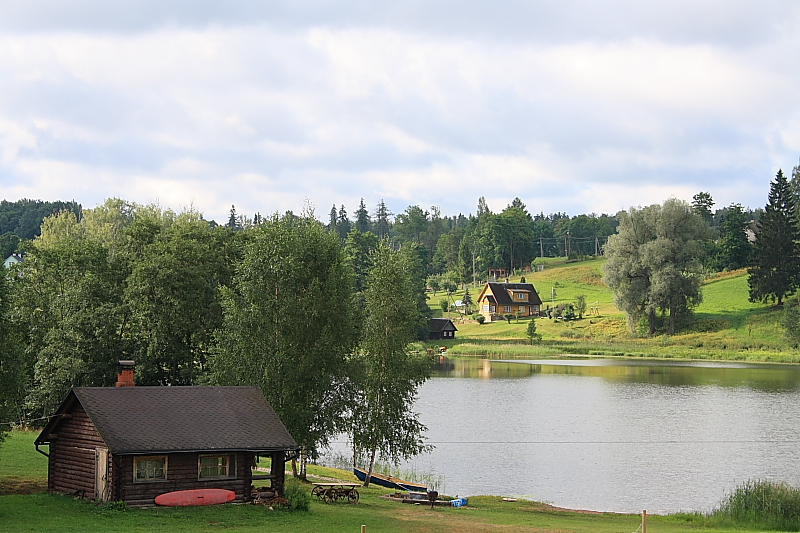
- Ratasjärv in Rõuge Parish

- Flag Coat of arms

- Rõuge Parish within Võru County.
- Country: Estonia
- County: Võru County
- Established: 2017
- Administrative centre: Rõuge

Area
  - Total: 933 km^{2} (360 sq mi)

Population (01.01.2019)
  - Total: 5,427
  - Density: 5.82/km^{2} (15.1/sq mi)
- ISO 3166 code: EE-698
- Website: www.rauge.ee

Rõuge Parish (Estonian: Rõuge vald; Võro: Rõugõ vald) is a rural municipality of Estonia, in Võru County. In 2019, it had a population of 5,427 and an area of 933 km^{2}.

In 2017, it merged with Haanja Parish, Mõniste Parish, Misso Parish, and Varstu Parish to create a new entity. It retained the Rõuge Parish name.

== Settlements ==
Small boroughs

Misso - Rõuge - Varstu

Villages

Aabra - Ahitsa - Ala-Palo - Ala-Suhka - Ala-Tilga - Andsumäe - Augli - Haabsilla - Haanja - Häärmäni - Haavistu - Haki - Hallimäe - Hämkoti - Handimiku - Hanija - Hansi - Hapsu - Härämäe - Harjuküla - Heedu - Heibri - Hinsa - Hino - Hintsiko - Hinu - Holdi - Horoski - Horosuu - Horsa - Hotõmäe - Hulaku - Hurda - Hürova - Hürsi - Hüti - Ihatsi - Jaanimäe - Jaanipeebu - Järvekülä - Järvepalu - Jugu - Käänu - Kääraku - Kaaratautsa - Käbli - Kadõni - Kähri - Kahrila-Mustahamba - Kahru - Kaku - Kaldemäe - Kallaste - Kaloga - Kaluka - Kängsepä - Kangsti - Karaski - Karba - Kärinä - Karisöödi - Kaubi - Kaugu - Kavõldi - Kellämäe - Kergatsi - Kiidi - Kilomani - Kimalase - Kimalasõ - Kirbu - Kiviora - Kivioru - Koemetsa - Kogrõ - Kokõ - Kokõjüri - Kokõmäe - Kolga - Kõomäe - Koorla - Kõrgepalu - Korgõssaarõ - Kossa - Kotka - Krabi - Kriguli - Kuiandi - Kuklase - Kuklasõ - Külma - Kundsa - Kurgjärve - Kurõ - Kurvitsa - Kuuda - Kuura - Kuutsi - Laisi - Laitsna-Hurda - Laossaarõ - Lauri - Laurimäe - Leoski - Liguri - Liivakupalu - Lillimõisa - Listaku - Loogamäe - Lükkä - Lutika - Lüütsepa - Luutsniku - Mäe-Lüütsepä - Mäe-Palo - Mäe-Suhka - Mäe-Tilga - Mahtja - Mallika - Märdi - Märdimiku - Matsi - Mauri - Meelaku - Metstaga - Miilimäe - Mikita - Missokülä - Misso-Saika - Möldre - Möldri - Mõniste - Mõõlu - Muduri - Muhkamõtsa - Muna - Naapka - Nilbõ - Muraski - Murati - Murdõmäe - Mustahamba - Mutemetsa - Naapka - Nilbõ - Nogu - Nursi - Ortumäe - Paaburissa - Paeboja - Paganamaa - Pähni - Pältre - Palujüri - Palanumäe - Palli - Palujüri - Pärlijõe - Parmu - Parmupalu - Pausakunnu - Pedejä - Peebu - Peedo - Petrakuudi - Piipsemäe - Pillardi - Plaani - Plaksi - Põdra - Põdramõtsa - Põnni - Põru - Posti - Preeksa - Pressi - Pugõstu - Pulli - Pundi - Punsa - Pupli - Purka - Puspuri - Püssä - Raagi - Rammuka - Rasva - Raudsepa - Raudsepä - Rebäse - Rebäsemõisa - Resto - Riitsilla - Ristemäe - Ritsiko - Rogosi-Mikita - Roobi - Rõuge-Matsi - Rusa - Ruuksu - Ruusmäe - Saagri - Saagrimäe - Saarlasõ - Sadramõtsa - Saika - Saki - Sakudi - Sakurgi - Saluora - Sandi - Sandisuu - Sänna - Sapi - Sarise - Saru - Savimäe - Savioja - Savioru - Sika - Sikalaanõ - Siksälä - Simmuli - Simula - Singa - Soekõrdsi - Soemõisa - Soodi - Söödi - Soolätte - Soomõoru - Sormuli - Suurõ-Ruuga - Suurõsuu - Tagakolga - Tallima - Taudsa - Tialasõ - Tiidu - Tiitsa - Tika - Tilgu - Tindi - Toodsi - Tõnkova - Trolla - Tsiamäe - Tsiiruli - Tsiistre - Tsilgutaja - Tsirgupalu - Tsolli - Tsutsu - Tummelka - Tundu - Tursa - Tuuka - Tüütsi - Udsali - Utessuu - Uue-Saaluse - Vaalimäe - Vaarkali - Vadsa - Väiko-Tiilige - Väiku-Ruuga - Vakari - Vanamõisa - Vana-Roosa - Vänni - Vastsekivi - Vastse-Roosa - Vihkla - Viitina - Viliksaarõ - Villa - Villike - Viru - Vodi - Vorstimäe - Vungi

== Religion ==
Religion in Rõuge Parish (2021)
1. Unaffiliated (72.4%)
2. Lutheran (18.8%)
3. Orthodox (4.70%)
4. Others Christians (0.30%)
5. Unknown (3.80%)
6. 0.00%

== Gallery ==
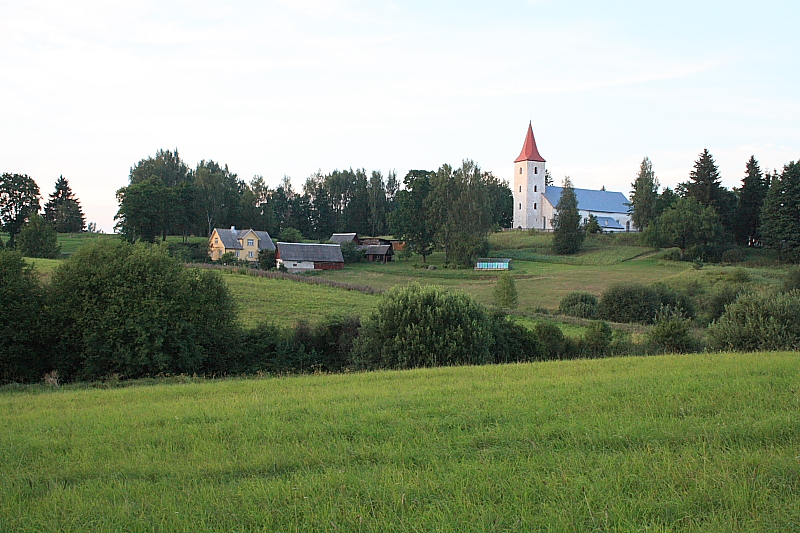
Maarja church in Rõuge

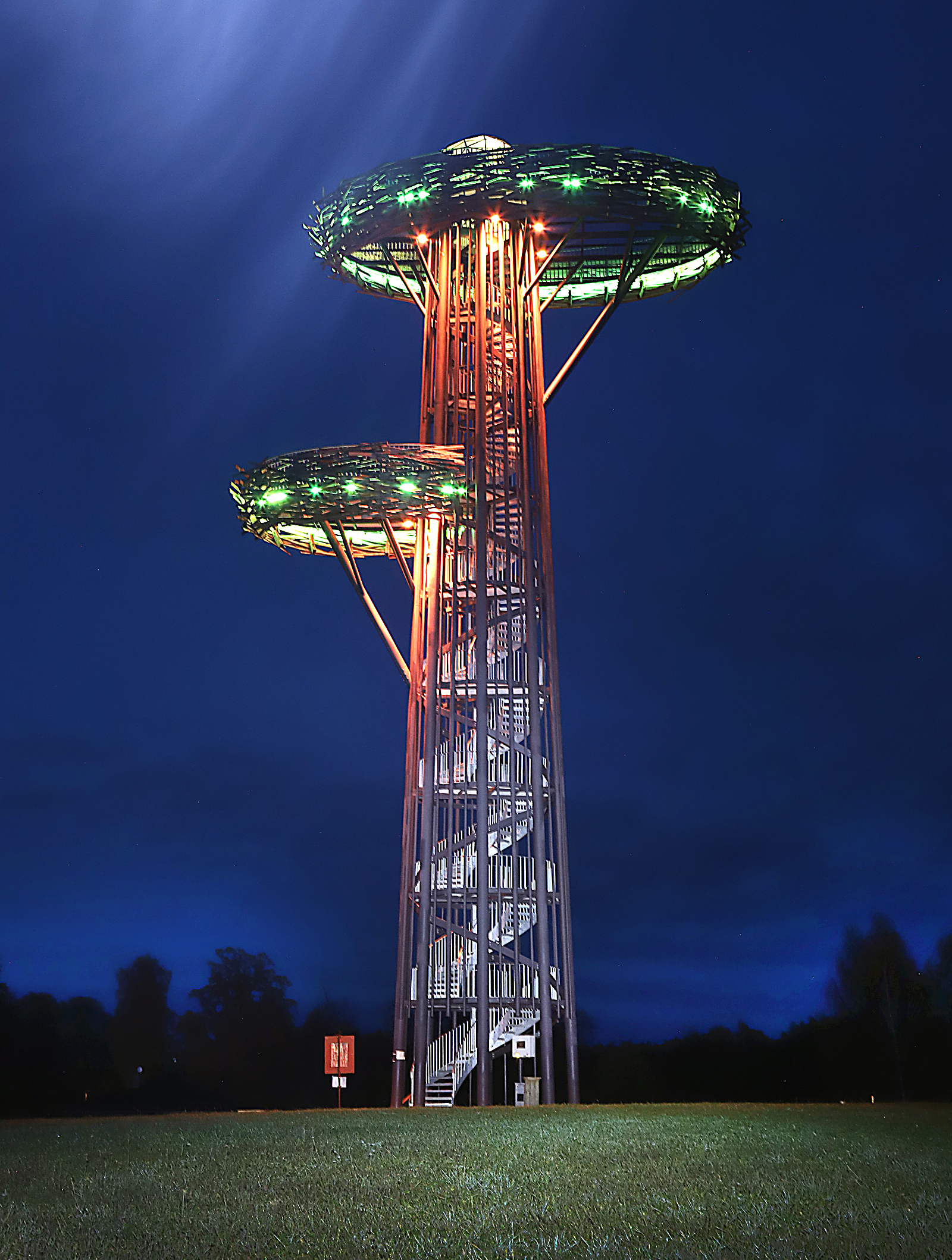
Rõuge observation tower

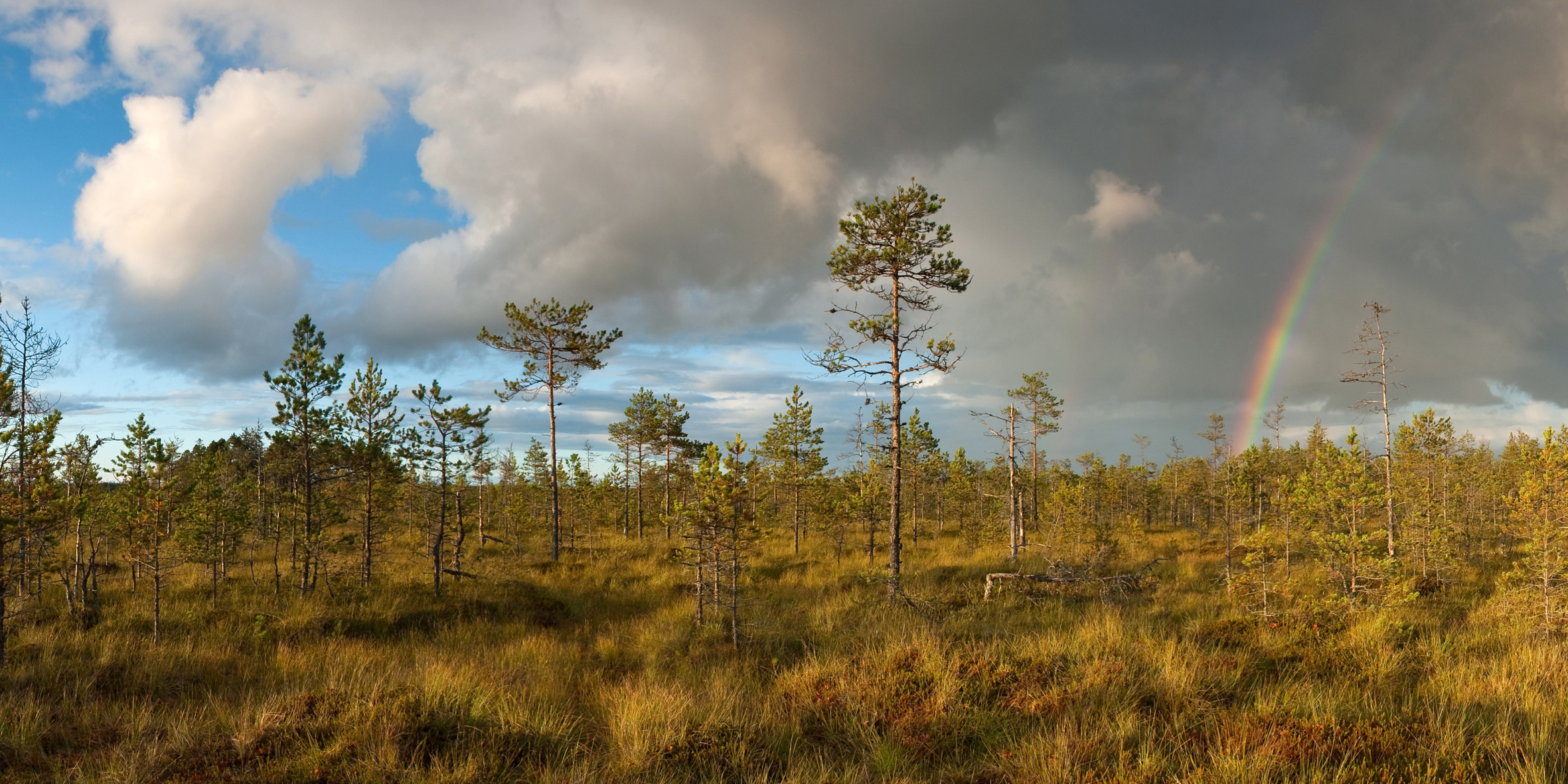
Luhasoo bog

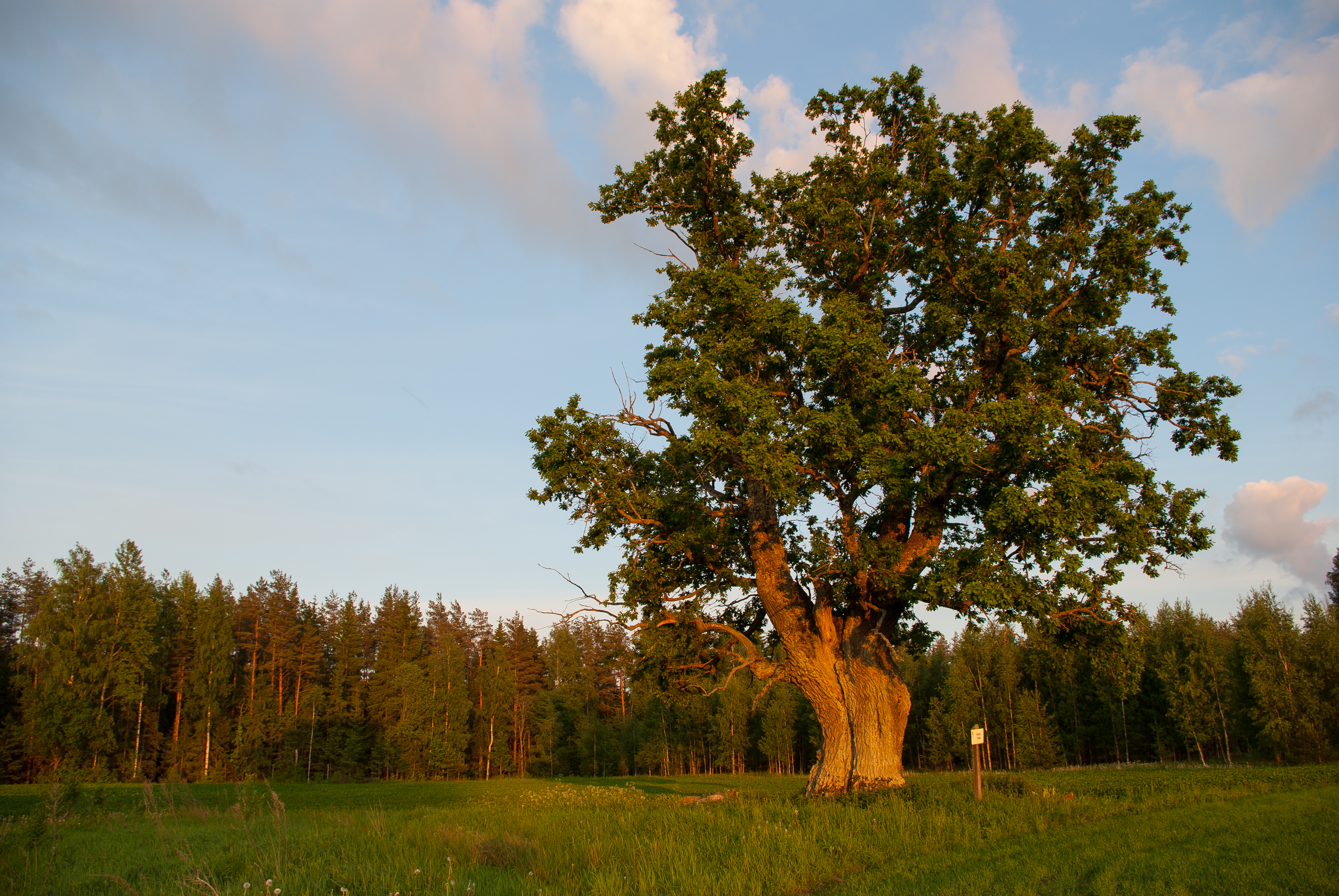
Ruuga oak

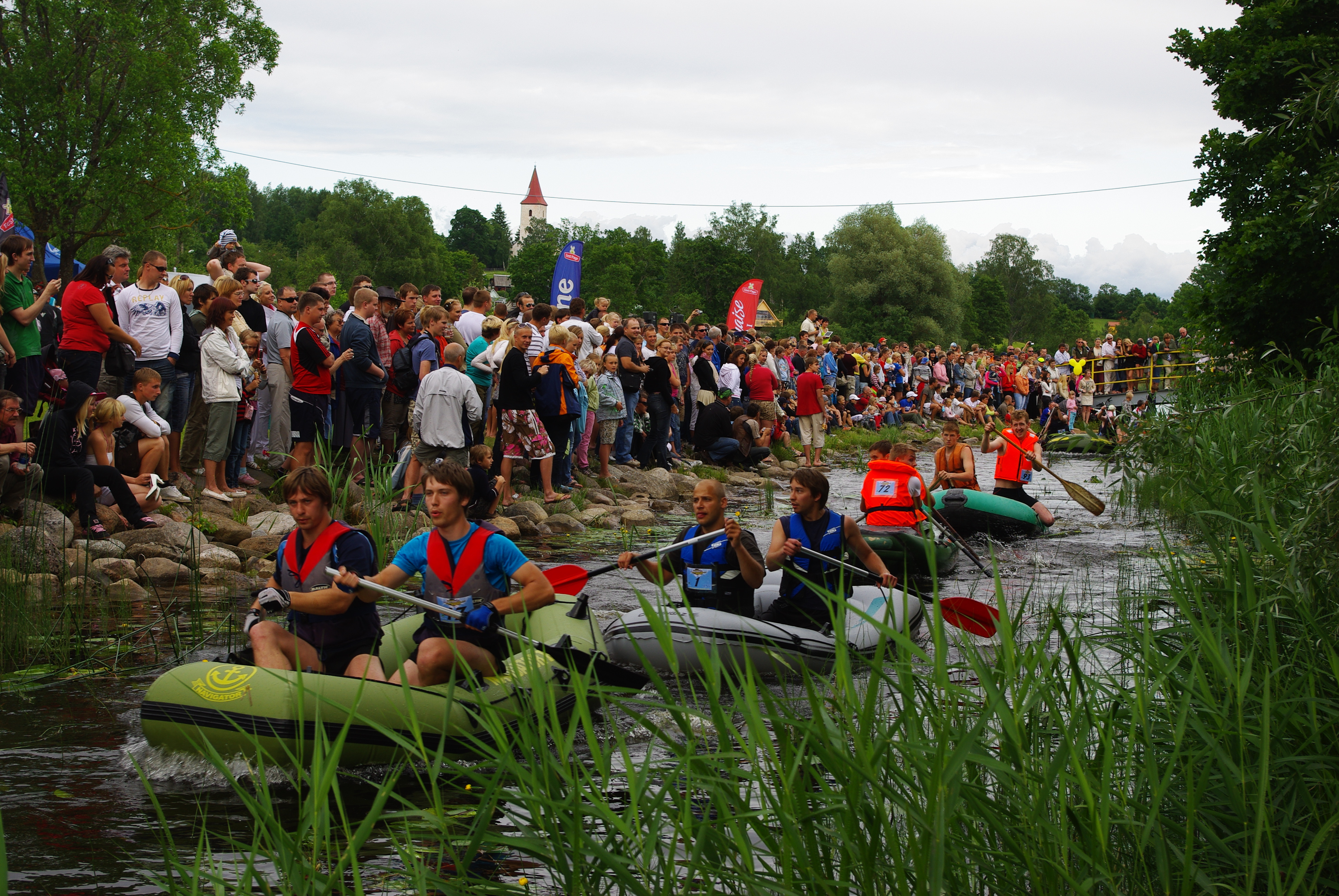
Boat rally

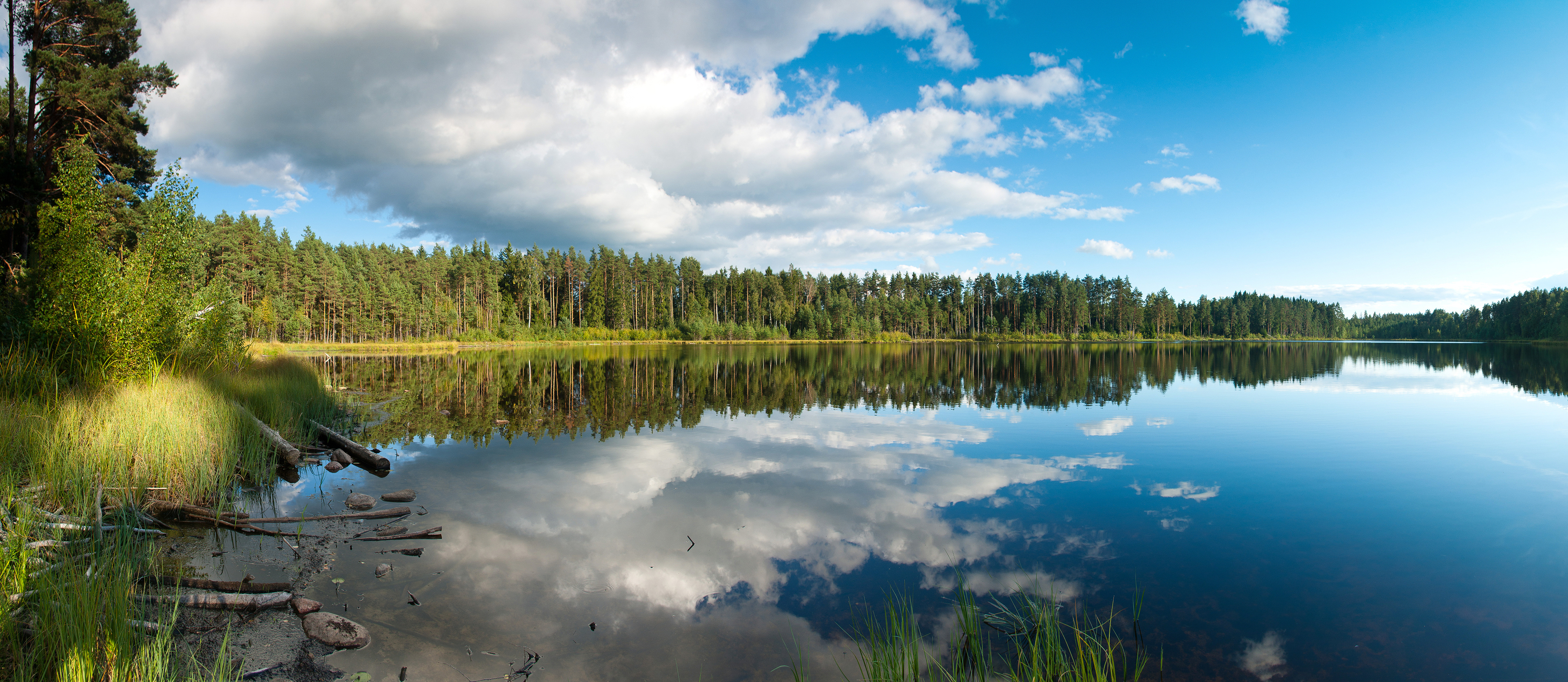
Lake Ahitsõ

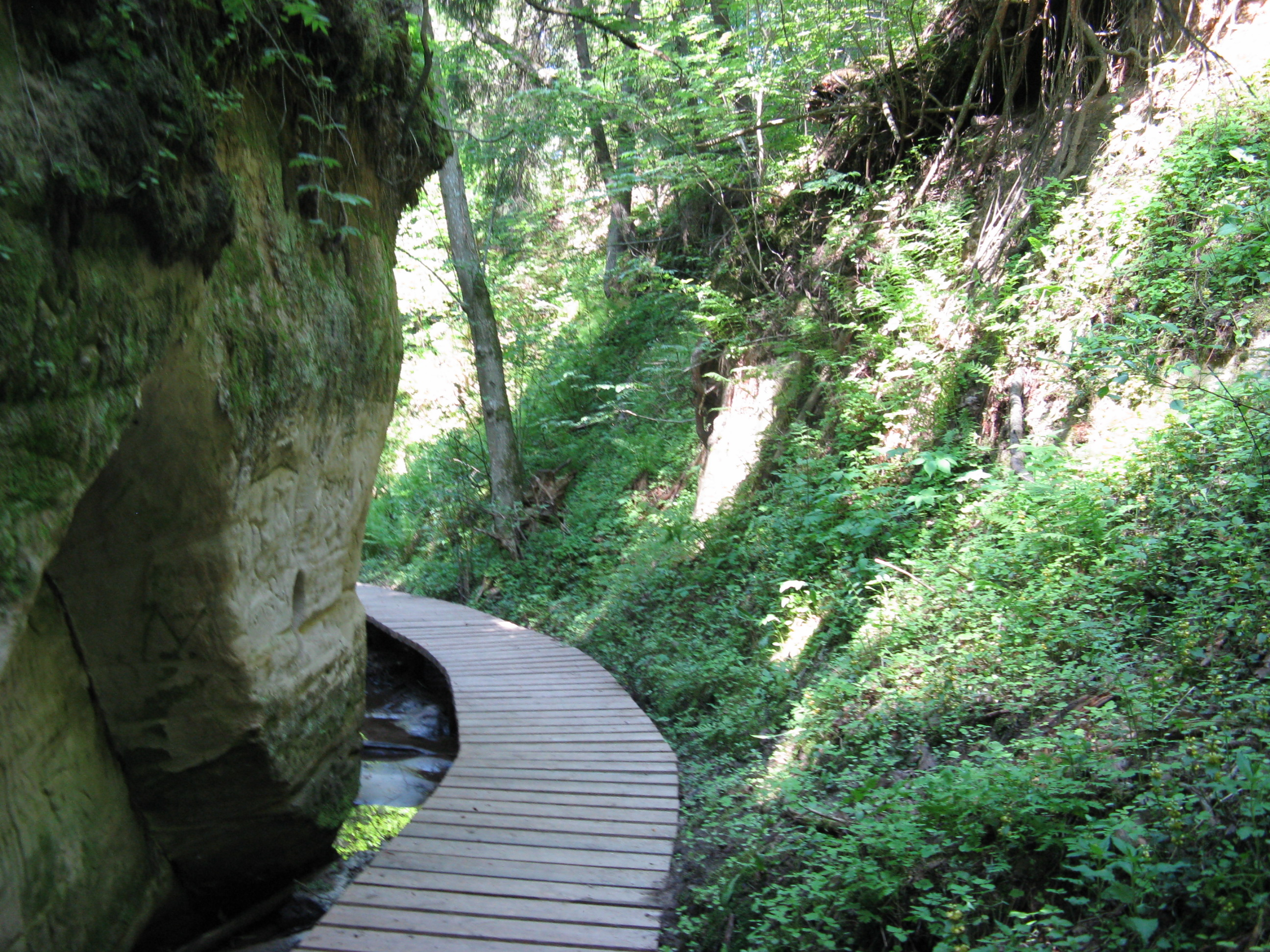
Hinni canyon

== Notable people ==
- Artur Adson (1889 in Sänna – 1977), poet, writer and theatre critic.
- Armin Tuulse (1907 in Sänna – 1977), an art historian he researched medieval architecture, fortifications, castles, and churches in the Baltic and Nordic countries; professor of art history at the University of Tartu, 1942 to 1944.
- Kadi Taniloo (1911 in Rõuge – 1998), actress, theatre director, and journalist.
- Ferdinand Eisen (1914 in Nursi – 2000), educator, pedagogy researcher and Minister of Education, 1980
- Heini Paas (1918 in Mõniste Parish – 2021), art historian, custodian of the sculptures at the Art Museum of Estonia
- Erich Kukk (1928 in Misso Parish – 2017), phycologist and conservationist.
- Vello Helk (1923 in Varstu – 2014), a Danish historian of local origin.
- Ülo Tootsen (1933 in Varstu Parish – 2006), biologist, journalist, publisher, editor, translator and politician.
- Tõnu Virve (1946 in Rõuge – 2019), theatre and film designer, artist, producer and director.

== See also ==
- Nursipalu training area
