= Haanja Parish =

Former municipality of Estonia

Coordinates: 57°43′10″N 27°3′9″E

Haanja Parish Haanja vald (in Estonian) Haani vald (in Võro)
- Municipality of Estonia
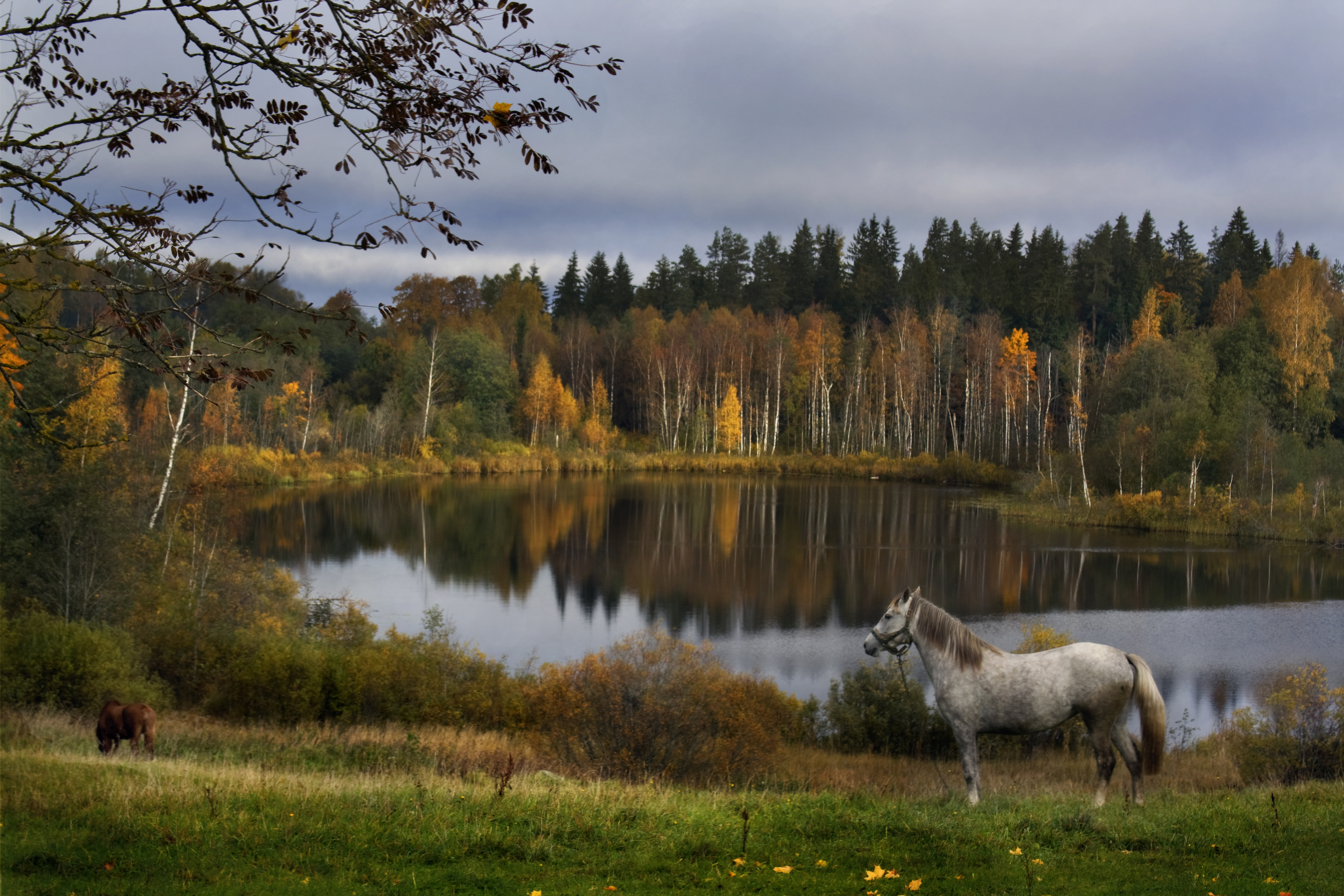

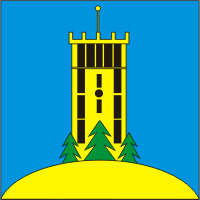
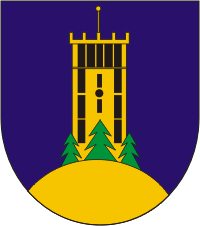
- Flag Coat of arms

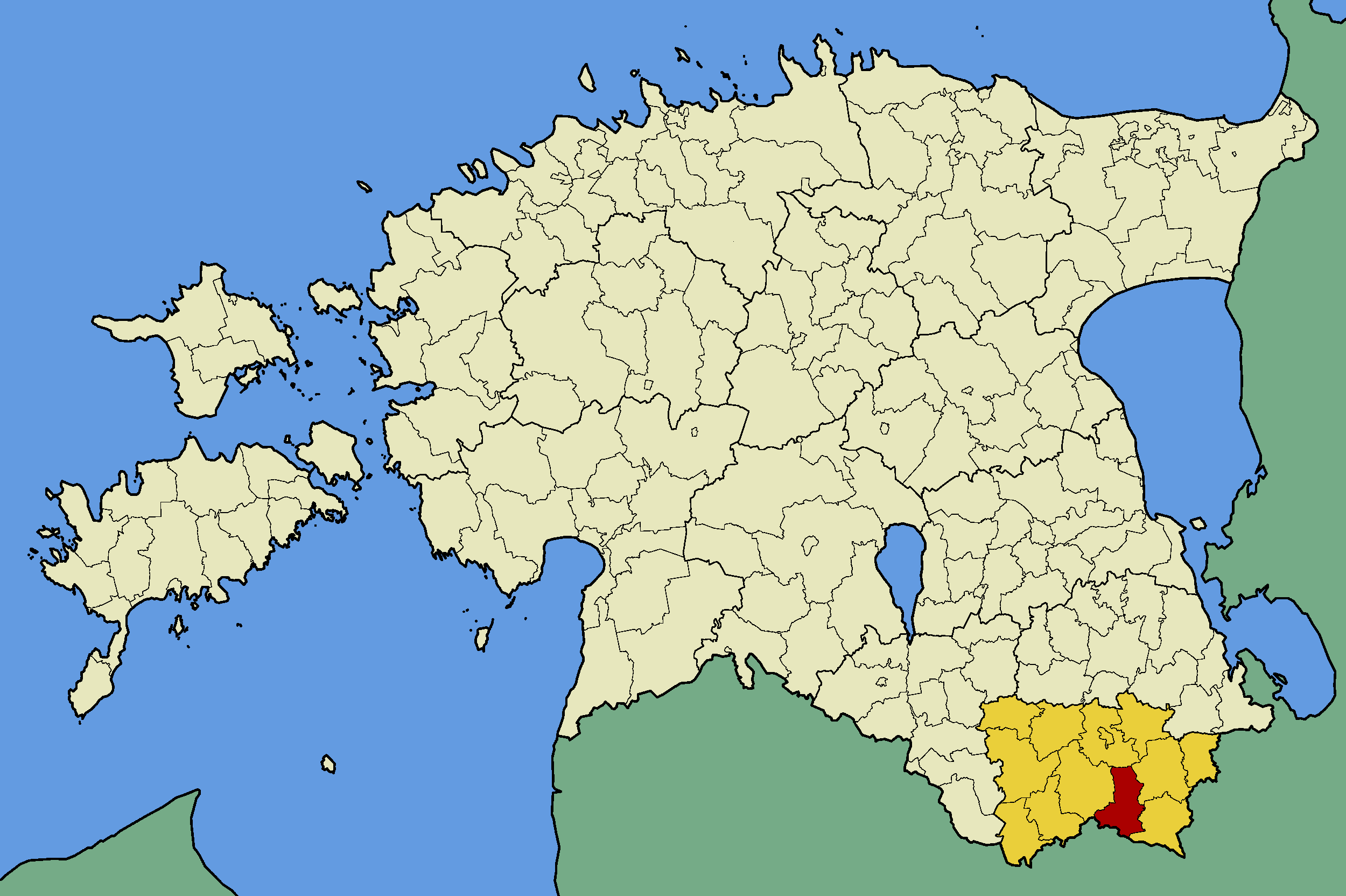
- Haanja Parish within Võru County.
- Country: Estonia
- County: Võru County
- Established: 1991
- Merged into expanded Rõuge Parish: 21 October 2017
- Administrative centre: Haanja

Area
  - Total: 170 km^{2} (66 sq mi)

Population (01.01.2006)
  - Total: 1,201
  - Density: 7.1/km^{2} (18/sq mi)
- Website: www.haanja.ee

Haanja Parish (Estonian: Haanja vald; Võro: Haani vald) was a rural municipality in Võru County, southeastern Estonia.

In 2017, it merged with Rõuge Parish, Mõniste Parish, Misso Parish, and Varstu Parish to create a new entity. It retained the Rõuge Parish name.

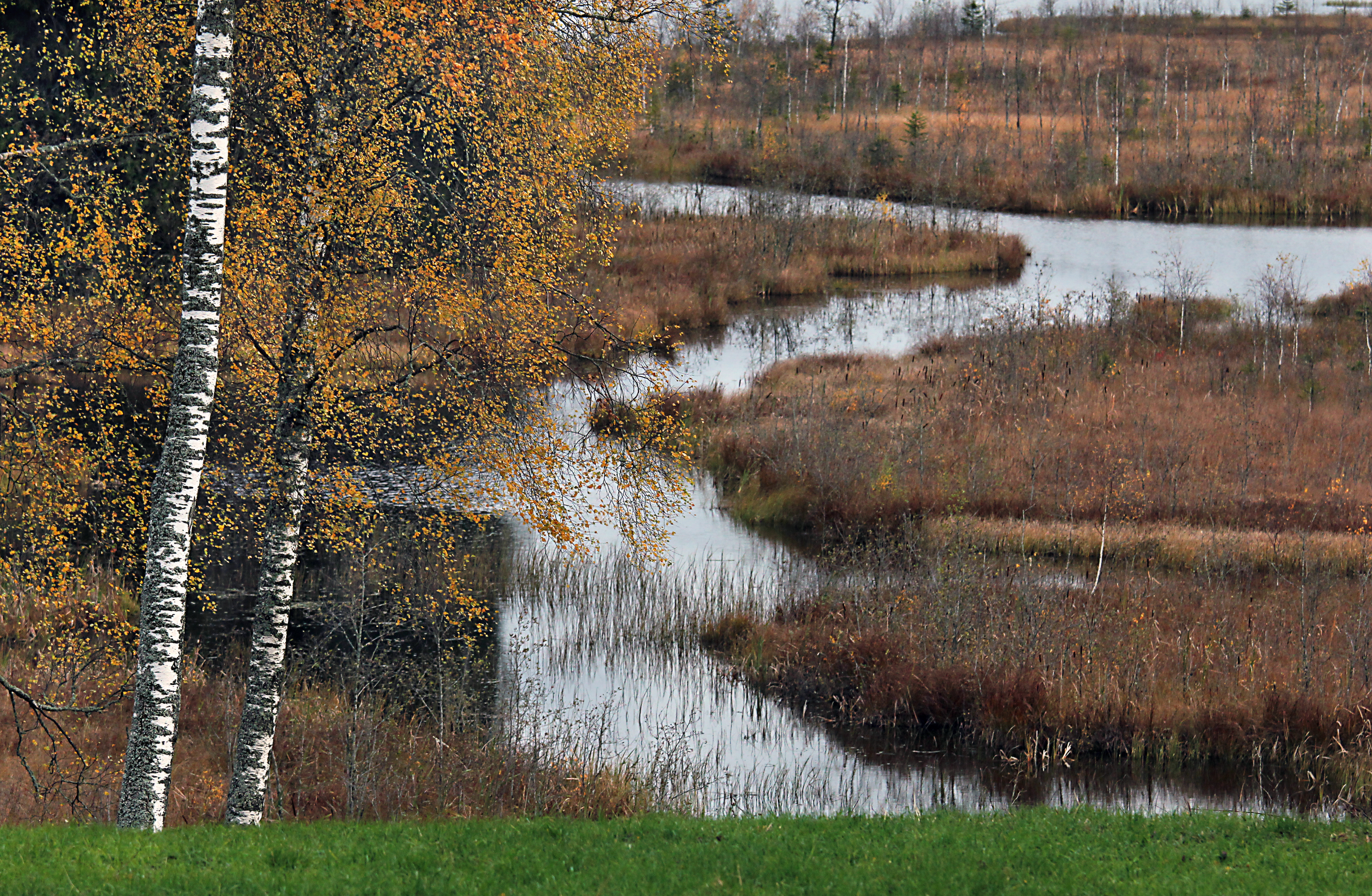
Lake Vaskna in Southern Estonia

== Settlements ==
Villages

Ala-Palo - Ala-Suhka - Ala-Tilga - Andsumäe - Haanja - Haavistu - Hämkoti - Hanija - Holdi - Horoski - Hulaku - Hurda - Ihatsi - Jaanimäe - Käänu - Kääraku - Kaaratautsa - Kaldemäe - Kallaste - Kaloga - Kergatsi - Kilomani - Kirbu - Kõomäe - Kotka - Kriguli - Kuiandi - Kuklase - Külma - Kuura - Leoski - Lillimõisa - Loogamäe - Lüütsepä - Luutsniku - Mäemurati - Mäe-Palo - Mäe-Suhka - Mäe-Tilga - Mahtja - Mallika - Märdimiku - Meelaku - Miilimäe - Mikita - Murati - Mustahamba - Naapka - Palanumäe - Palli - Palujüri - Pausakunnu - Peedo - Piipsemäe - Pillardi - Plaani - Plaksi - Posti - Preeksa - Pressi - Pundi - Purka - Puspuri - Raagi - Resto - Rusa - Ruusmäe - Saagri - Saika - Saluora - Sarise - Simula - Soodi - Söödi - Sormuli - Tõnkova - Trolla - Tsiamäe - Tsiiruli - Tsilgutaja - Tsolli - Tummelka - Tuuka - Uue-Saaluse - Vaalimäe - Vaarkali - Vakari - Vänni - Vastsekivi - Vihkla - Villa - Vorstimäe - Vungi
