= Posti =

Posti can refer to:

- Posti (1950 film), an Indian Punjabi-language film
- Posti (2022 film), an Indian Punjabi-language film by Gippy Grewal
- Posti Group, the Finnish national post office
- Posti, Estonia, a place in south-eastern Estonia
