= Kergatsi =

Village in Estonia

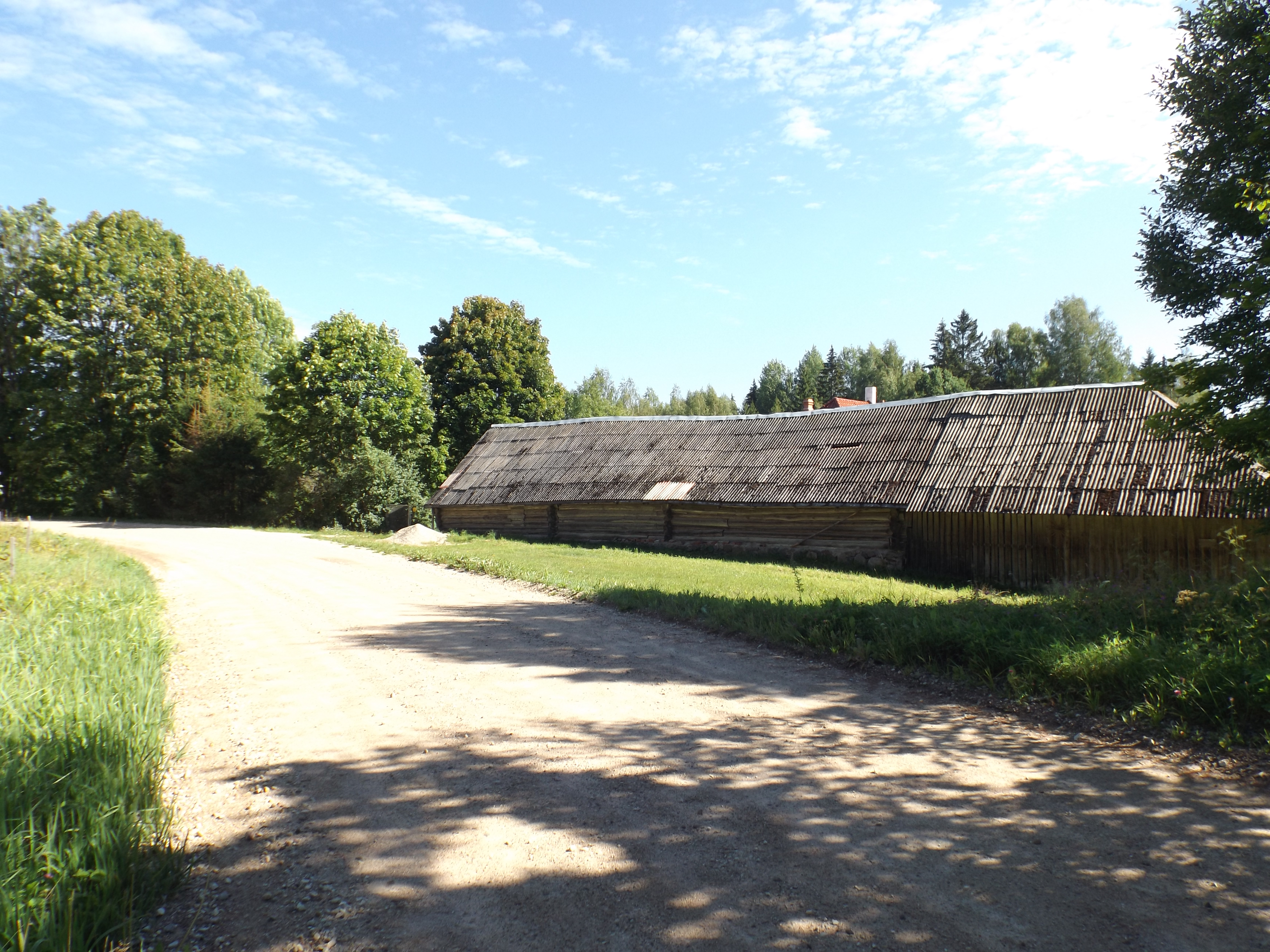
- An image of Kergatsi küla

- Location within Estonia
- Coordinates: 57°43′20″N 27°7′31″E
- Country: Estonia
- County: Võru County
- Municipality: Rõuge Parish
- Time zone: UTC+2 (EET)

Kergatsi is a settlement in Rõuge Parish, Võru County in southeastern Estonia. Between 1991–2017 (until the administrative reform of Estonian municipalities) the village was located in Haanja Parish.
