= Piipsemäe =

Village in Estonia

- Village
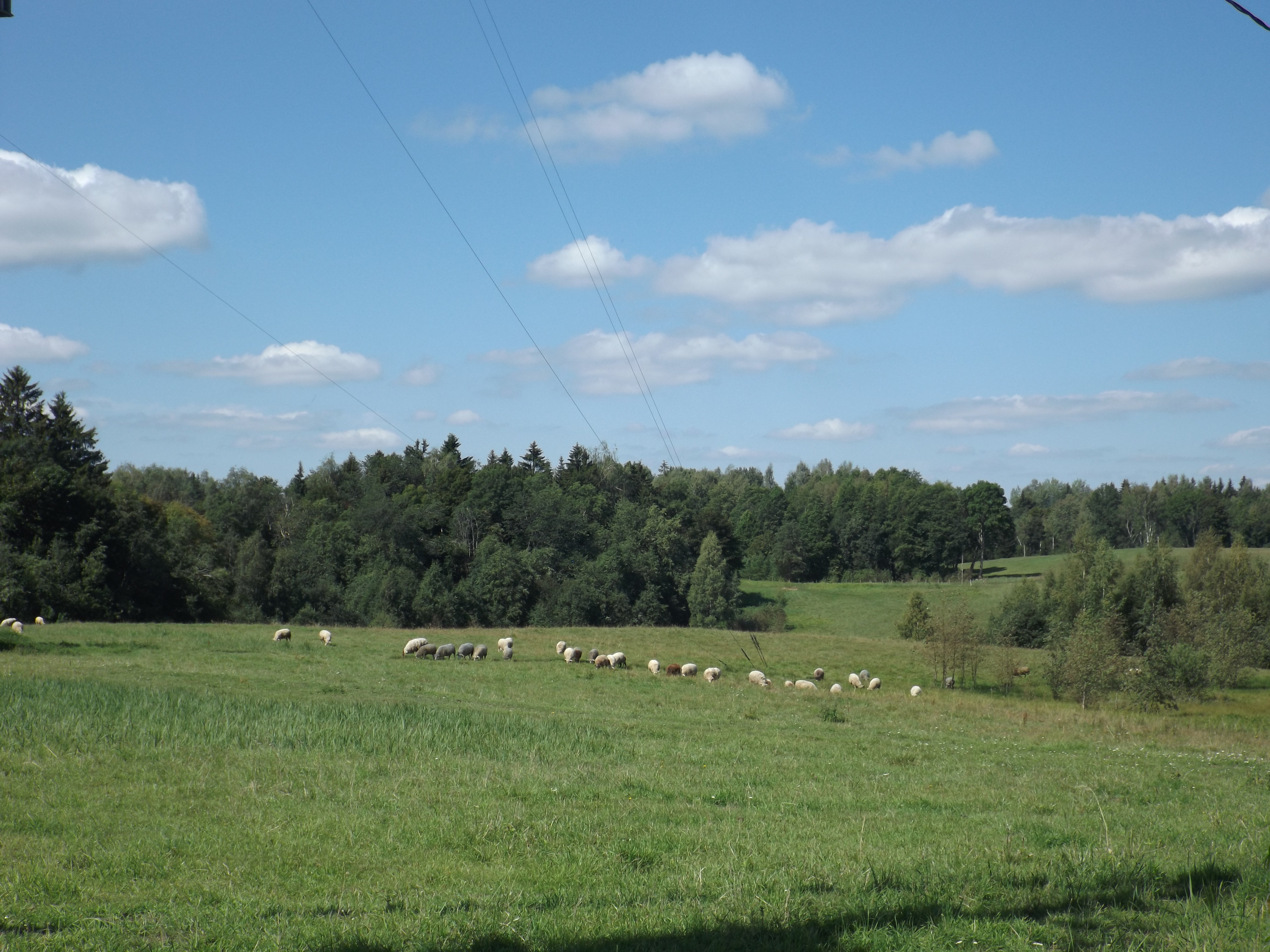
- Sheep in pasture in Piipsemäe

- Location within Estonia
- Coordinates: 57°40′6″N 27°6′46″E
- Country: Estonia
- County: Võru County
- Municipality: Rõuge Parish

Population (2019)
  - Total: 14
- Time zone: UTC+2 (EET)

Piipsemäe is a village in Rõuge Parish, Võru County in southeastern Estonia. Between 1991–2017 (until the administrative reform of Estonian municipalities) the village was located in Haanja Parish.
