= Haavistu =

Village in Võru County, Estonia

- Village
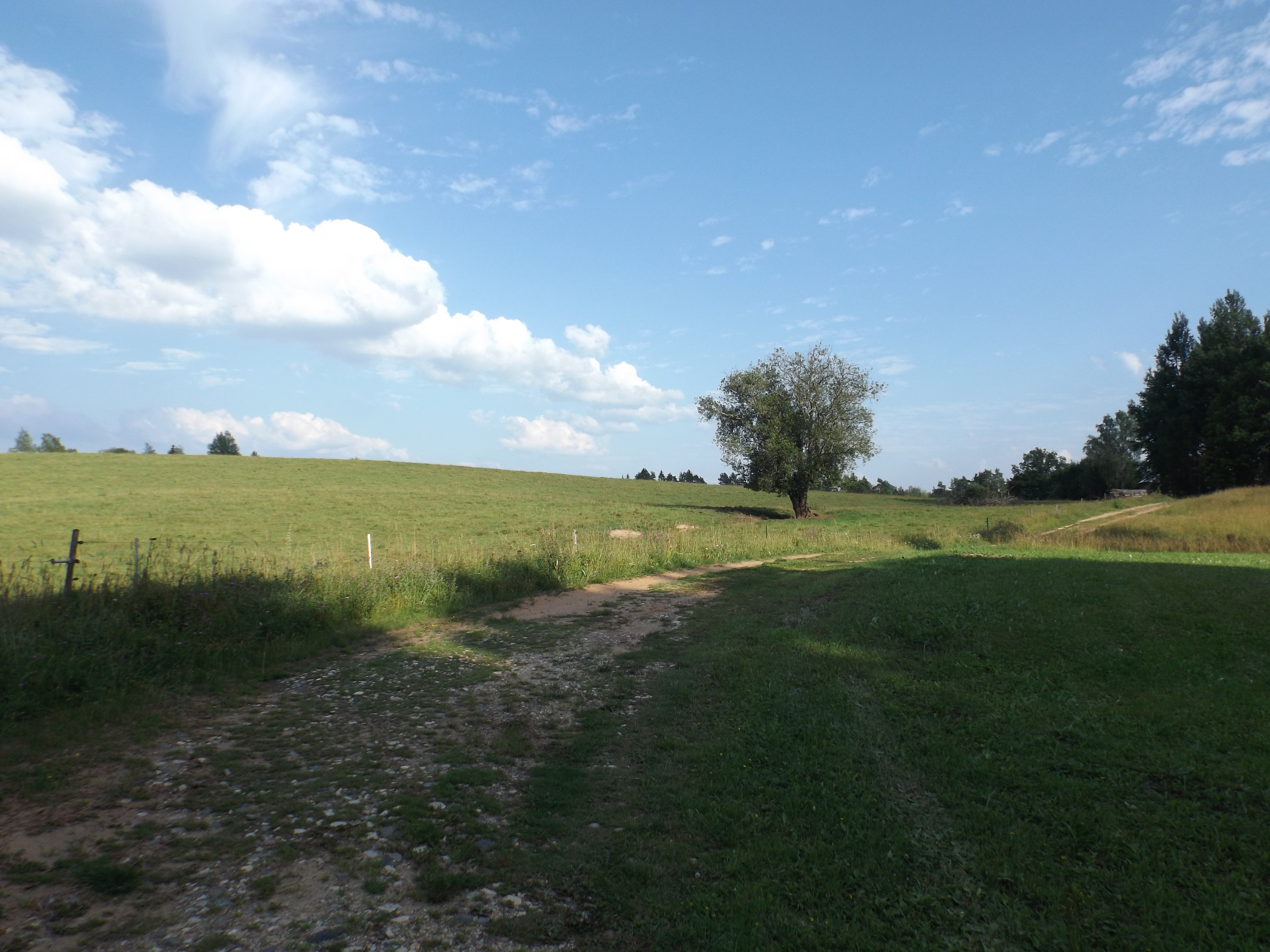

- Location in Estonia
- Coordinates: 57°42′13″N 27°06′09″E
- Country: Estonia
- County: Võru County
- Municipality: Rõuge Parish

Population (2021)
  - Total: 3

Haavistu is a village in Rõuge Parish, Võru County in southeastern Estonia. Prior to the administrative reform of municipalities in 2017, it was part of Haanja Parish. The population has been 3 since 2021.
