= Palanumäe =

Village in Estonia

- Location within Estonia
- Coordinates: 57°43′47″N 27°2′39″E
- Country: Estonia
- County: Võru County
- Municipality: Rõuge Parish
- Time zone: UTC+2 (EET)

Palanumäe is a village in Rõuge Parish, Võru County in southeastern Estonia. Between 1991-2017, until the administrative reform of Estonian municipalities, the village was located in Haanja Parish.
