= Kääraku =

Village in Estonia

- Village
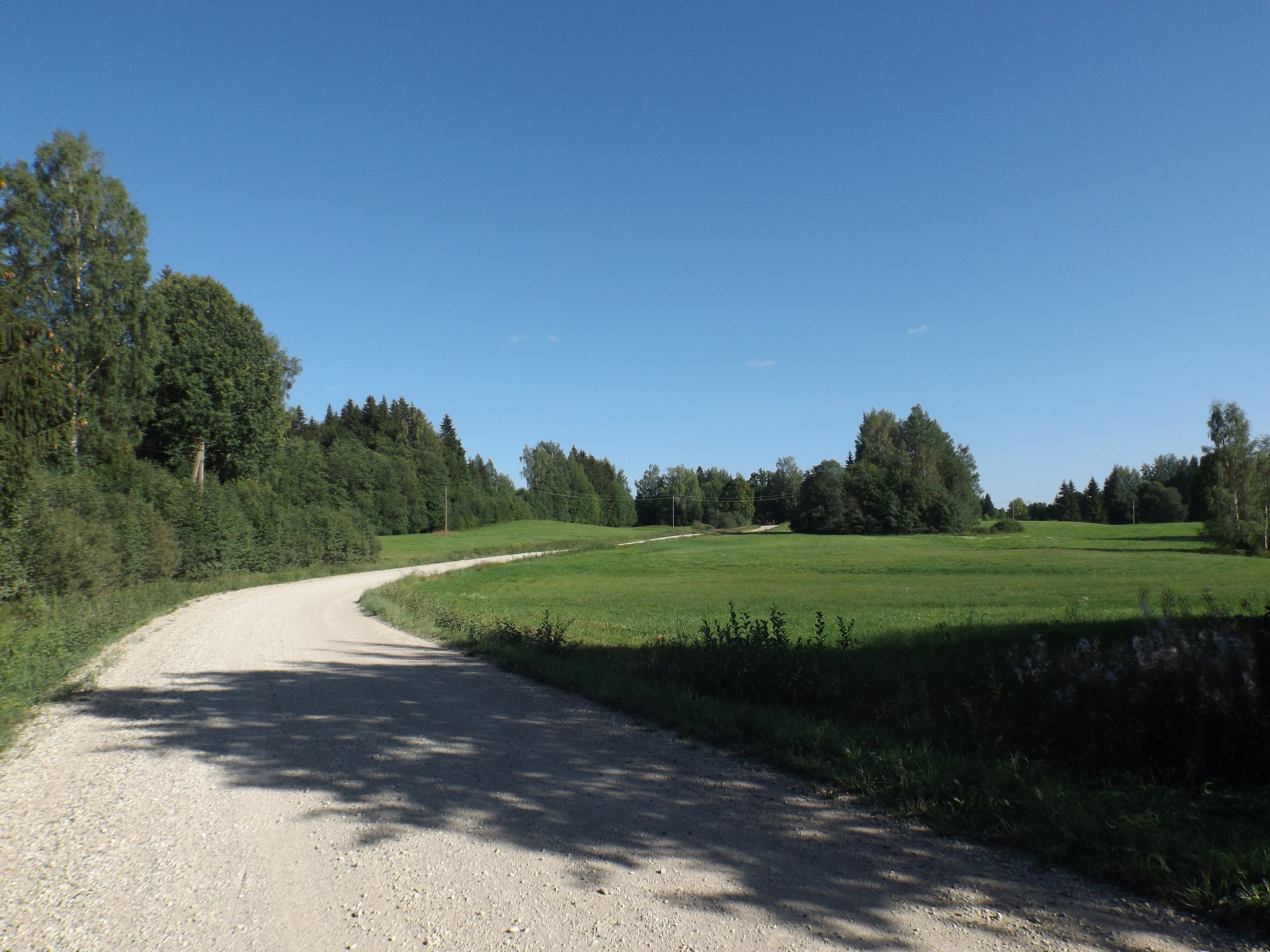
- Plaani-Kokõmäe road through Kääraku

- Location within Estonia
- Coordinates: 57°40′58″N 27°4′0″E
- Country: Estonia
- County: Võru County
- Parish: Rõuge Parish
- Time zone: UTC+2 (EET)
  - Summer (DST): UTC+3 (EEST)

Kääraku is a village in Rõuge Parish, Võru County in southeastern Estonia. Between 1991 and 2017 (until the administrative reform of Estonian municipalities) the village was located in Haanja Parish.
