= Simula, Estonia =

Village in Estonia

Simula
- Village
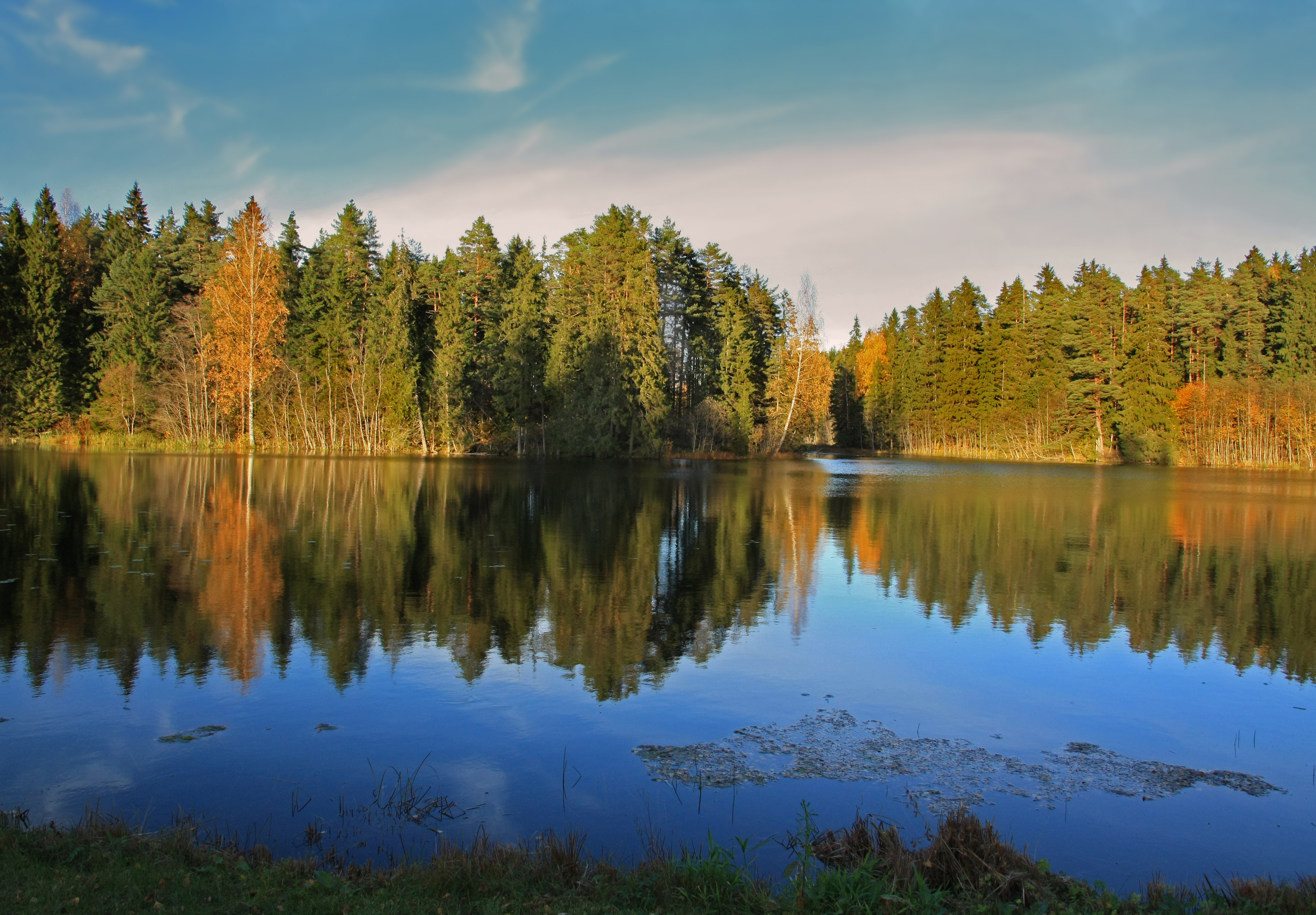
- Vällämäe Peräjärv, a lake in Simula

- Location in Estonia
- Coordinates: 57°44′35″N 27°02′44″E
- Country: Estonia
- County: Võru County
- Municipality: Rõuge Parish

Population (2011 Census)
  - Total: 18

Simula is a village in Rõuge Parish, Võru County, southeastern Estonia. Between 1991 and 2017 (until the administrative reform of Estonian municipalities) the village was located in Haanja Parish. As of the 2011 census, the settlement's population was 18.

There are three lakes located in Simula: Vällämäe Küläjärv (area 4.4 ha), Vällämäe Peräjärv and Vällämäe Vahejärv.
