= Andsumäe, Rõuge Parish =

Village in Estonia

Andsumäe
- Village
- Location within Estonia
- Coordinates: 57.5964°N 27.0758°E
- Country: Estonia
- County: Võru County
- Parish: Rõuge Parish
- Time zone: UTC+2 (EET)
  - Summer (DST): UTC+3 (EEST)

Andsumäe is a village in Rõuge Parish, Võru County, Estonia. Between 1991 and 2017 (until the administrative reform of Estonian municipalities) the village was located in Haanja Parish. The population is 0 since 2011.
