= Kilomani =

Village in Estonia

- Village
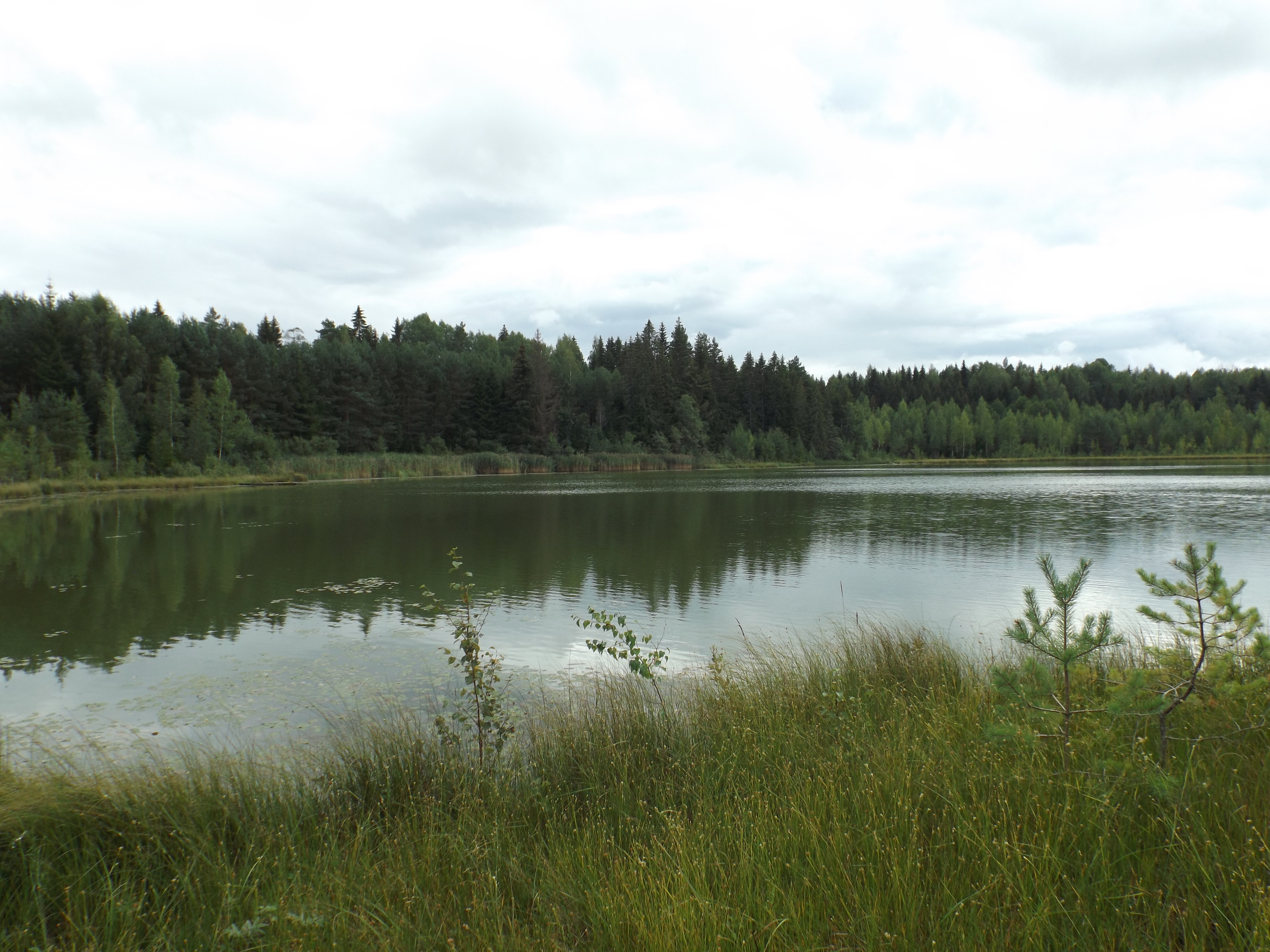
- Kikri Lake in Kilomani

- Location within Estonia
- Coordinates: 57°37′46″N 27°0′45″E
- Country: Estonia
- County: Võru County
- Municipality: Rõuge Parish
- Time zone: UTC+2 (EET)

Kilomani is a village in Rõuge Parish, Võru County in southeastern Estonia. Between 1991 and 2017 (until the administrative reform of Estonian municipalities) the village was located in Haanja Parish.
