= Palli, Võru County =

Village in Estonia

Palli
- Village
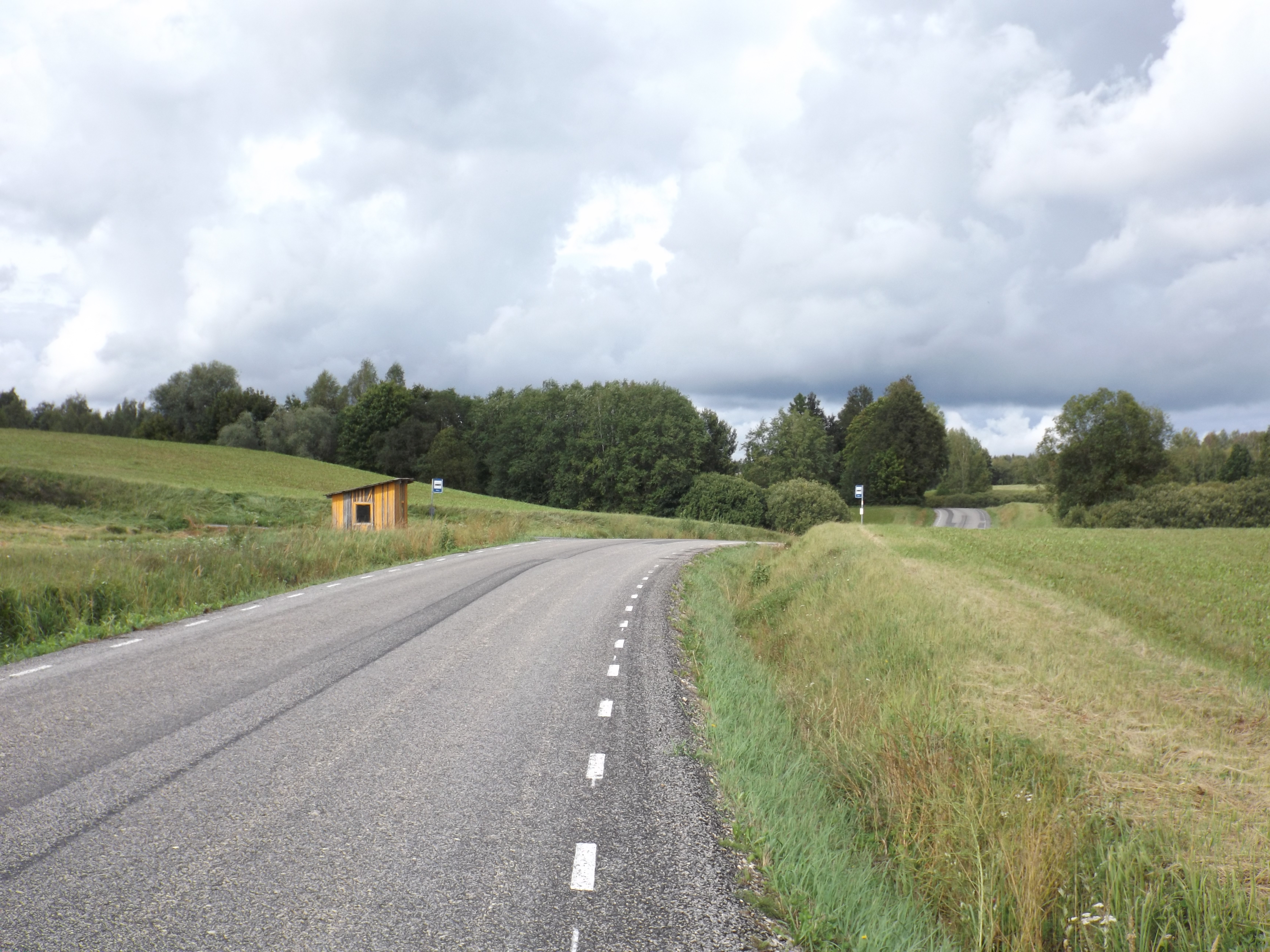
- Bus stop in Palli

- Location within Estonia
- Coordinates: 57°38′36″N 26°58′31″E
- Country: Estonia
- County: Võru County
- Parish: Rõuge Parish
- Time zone: UTC+2 (EET)
  - Summer (DST): UTC+3 (EEST)

Palli is a village in Rõuge Parish, Võru County in southeastern Estonia. Between 1991 and 2017 (until the administrative reform of Estonian municipalities) the village was located in Haanja Parish.
