= Mäe-Palo =

Village in Võru County, Estonia

- Village
- Location in Estonia
- Coordinates: 57°37′15″N 27°06′52″E
- Country: Estonia
- County: Võru County
- Municipality: Rõuge Parish

Population (2019)
  - Total: 13

Mäe-Palo is a village in Rõuge Parish, Võru County in Estonia. Prior to the 2017 administrative reform, it was part of Haanja Parish.
