= Pressi =

Village in Estonia

- Location within Estonia
- Coordinates: 57°41′43″N 27°8′34″E
- Country: Estonia
- County: Võru County
- Municipality: Rõuge Parish
- Time zone: UTC+2 (EET)

Pressi is a village in Rõuge Parish, Võru County in southeastern Estonia. Between 1991 and 2017 (until the administrative reform of Estonian municipalities) the village was located in Haanja Parish.
