= Naapka =

Village in Estonia

- Village
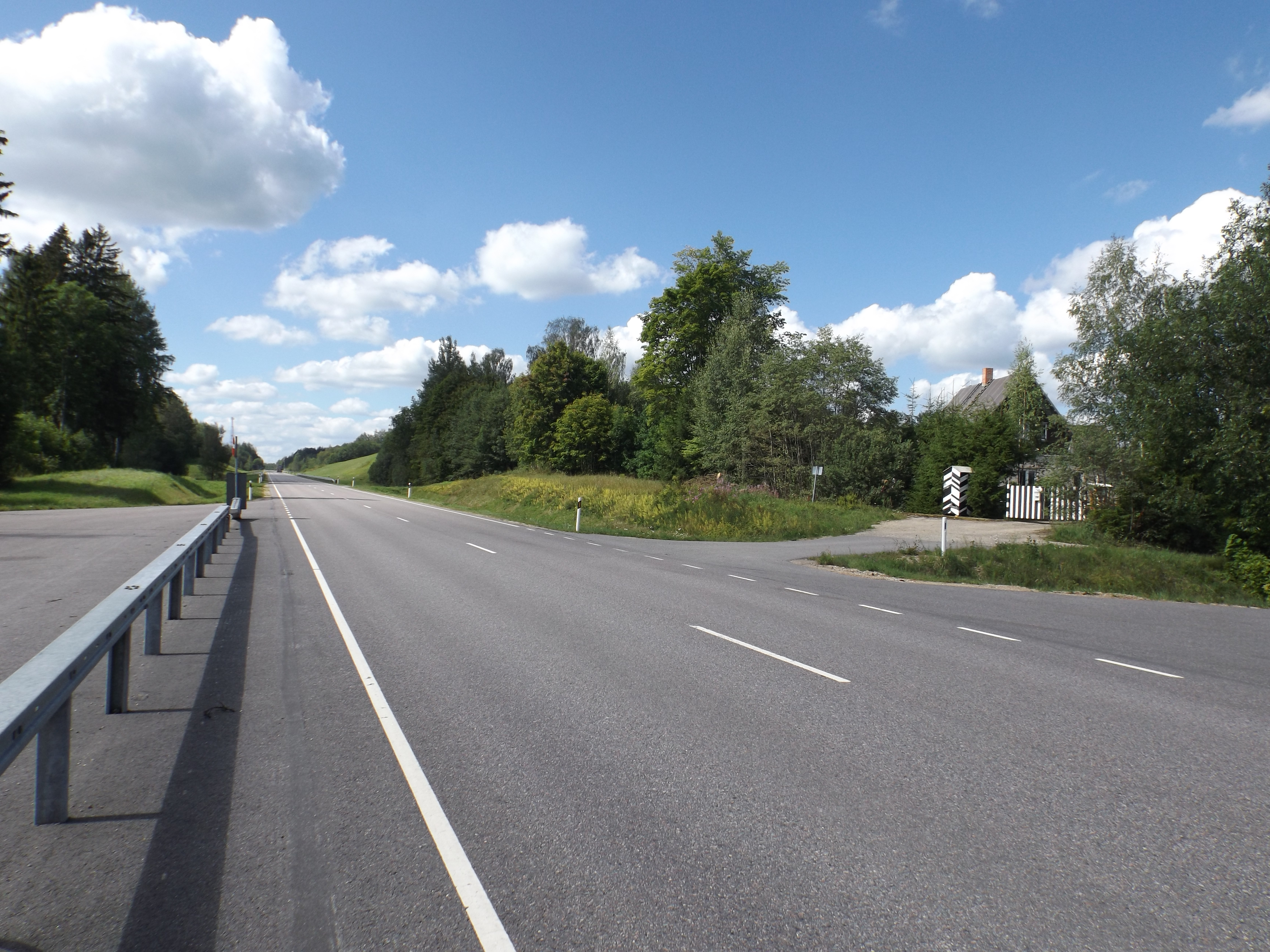
- Riga-Pskov highway in Naapka

- Location within Estonia
- Coordinates: 57.590°N 27.067°E
- Country: Estonia
- County: Võru County
- Parish: Rõuge Parish
- Time zone: UTC+2 (EET)
  - Summer (DST): UTC+3 (EEST)

Naapka is a village in Rõuge Parish, Võru County in Estonia.

Southern part of Naapka is called "Mäe-Murati", which in the 1930s was considered as a standalone village.
