= Vaarkali, Võru Parish =

Village in Estonia

Vaarkali
- Location within Estonia
- Coordinates: 57°46′51″N 27°11′42″E
- Country: Estonia
- County: Võru County
- Municipality: Võru Parish

Population
  - Total: 1

Vaarkali is a village in Estonia, in Võru Parish, which belongs to Võru County.
