= Hanija =

Village in Estonia

- Village
- Location within Estonia
- Country: Estonia
- County: Võru
- Parish: Rõuge

Population (2021)
  - Total: 6
- Time zone: UTC+2 (EET)
  - Summer (DST): UTC+3 (EEST)

Hanija is a village in Rõuge Parish, Võru County in Estonia.
