= Plaksi =

Village in Estonia

- Village
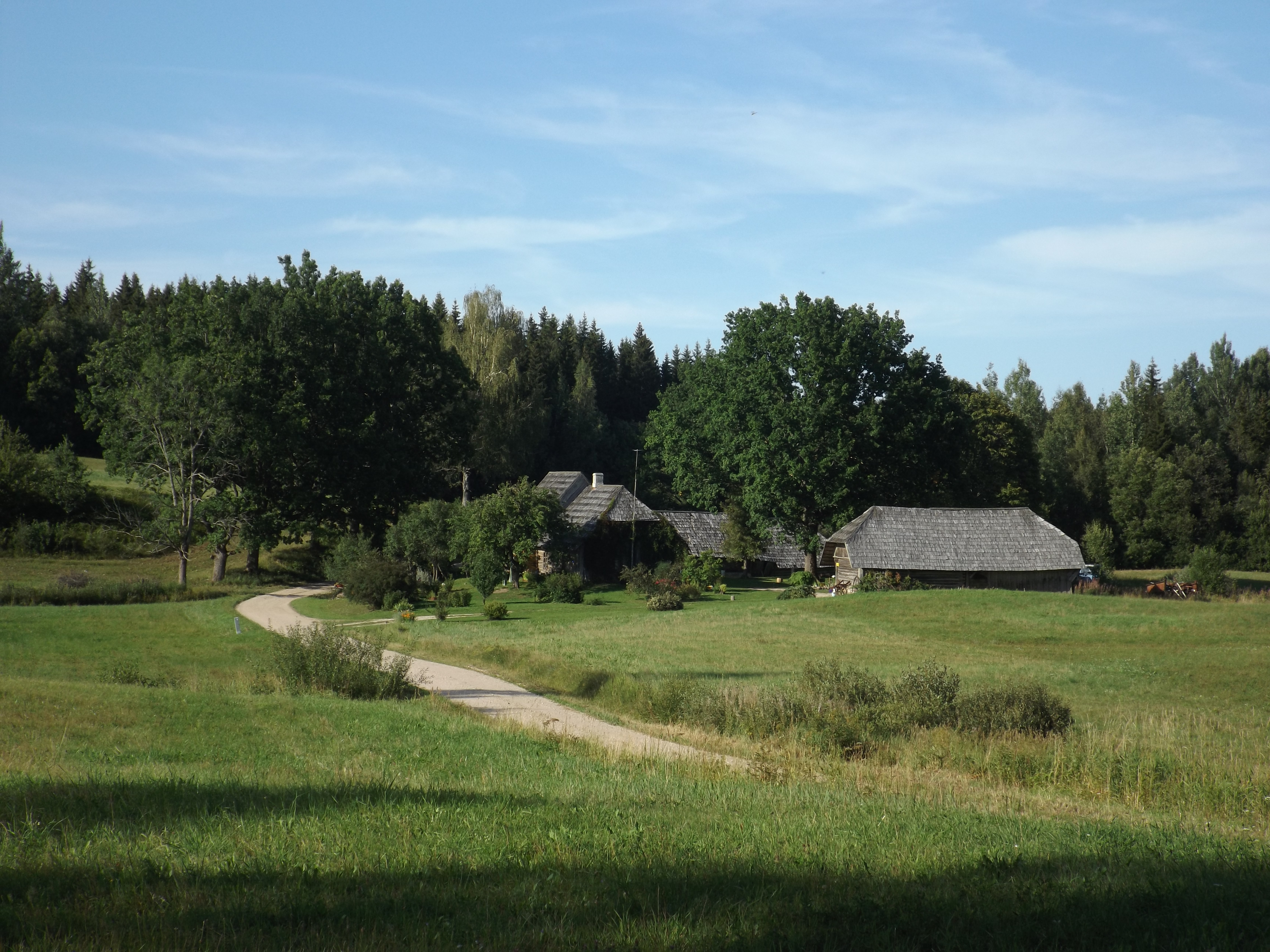
- Farmstead in Plaksi

- Location within Estonia
- Coordinates: 57.7069°N 27.0606°E
- Country: Estonia
- County: Võru County
- Parish: Rõuge Parish
- Time zone: UTC+2 (EET)
  - Summer (DST): UTC+3 (EEST)

Plaksi is a village in Rõuge Parish, Võru County in Estonia.
