= Palujüri =

Village in Estonia

- Village
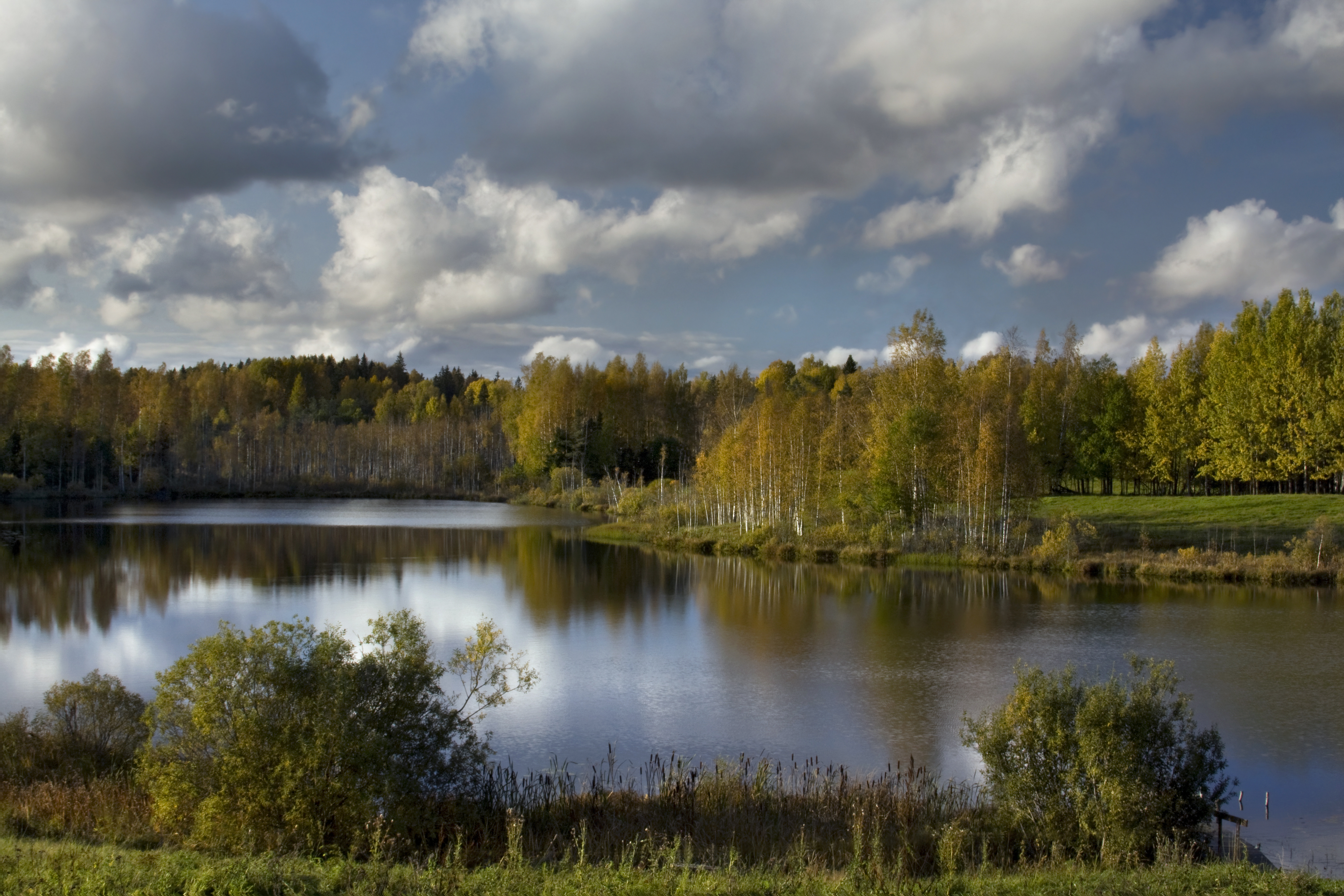
- Lake Palujüri

- Location within Estonia
- Coordinates: 57.6486°N 27.0367°E
- Country: Estonia
- County: Võru County
- Parish: Rõuge Parish
- Time zone: UTC+2 (EET)
  - Summer (DST): UTC+3 (EEST)

Palujüri is a village in Rõuge Parish, Võru County in Estonia. In the central part of the village is Lake Palujüri, which is connected by a stream to Lake Hanija within the boundaries of the neighboring village.
