= Ihatsi =

Village in Estonia

- Village
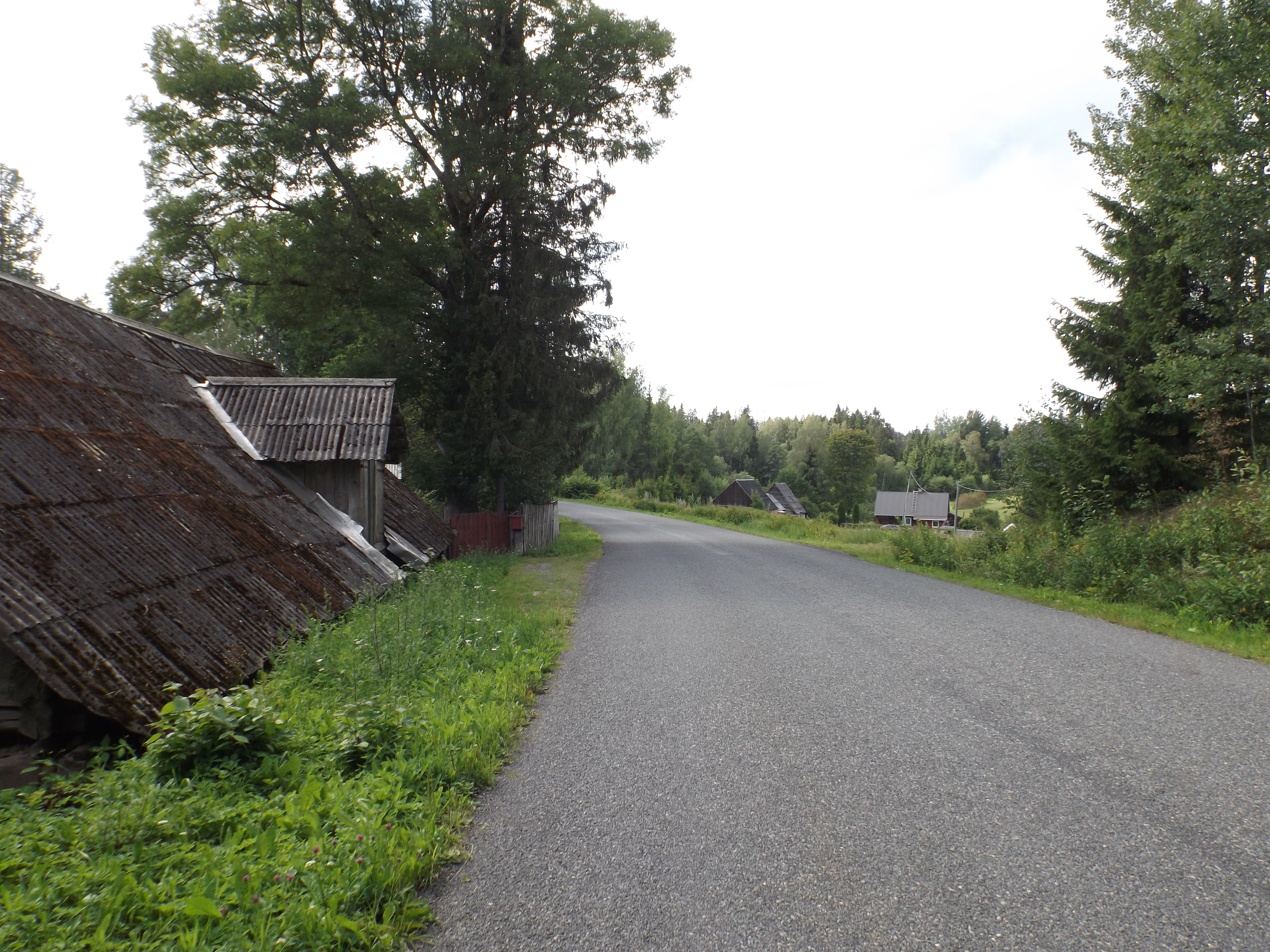
- Haanja–Kündja road in Ihatsi

- Location within Estonia
- Coordinates: 57°43′13″N 27°06′17″E
- Country: Estonia
- County: Võru County
- Parish: Rõuge Parish

Population (2021)
  - Total: 21
- Time zone: UTC+2 (EET)
  - Summer (DST): UTC+3 (EEST)

Ihatsi is a village in Rõuge Parish, Võru County in Estonia.
