= Vänni =

Village in Estonia

- Village
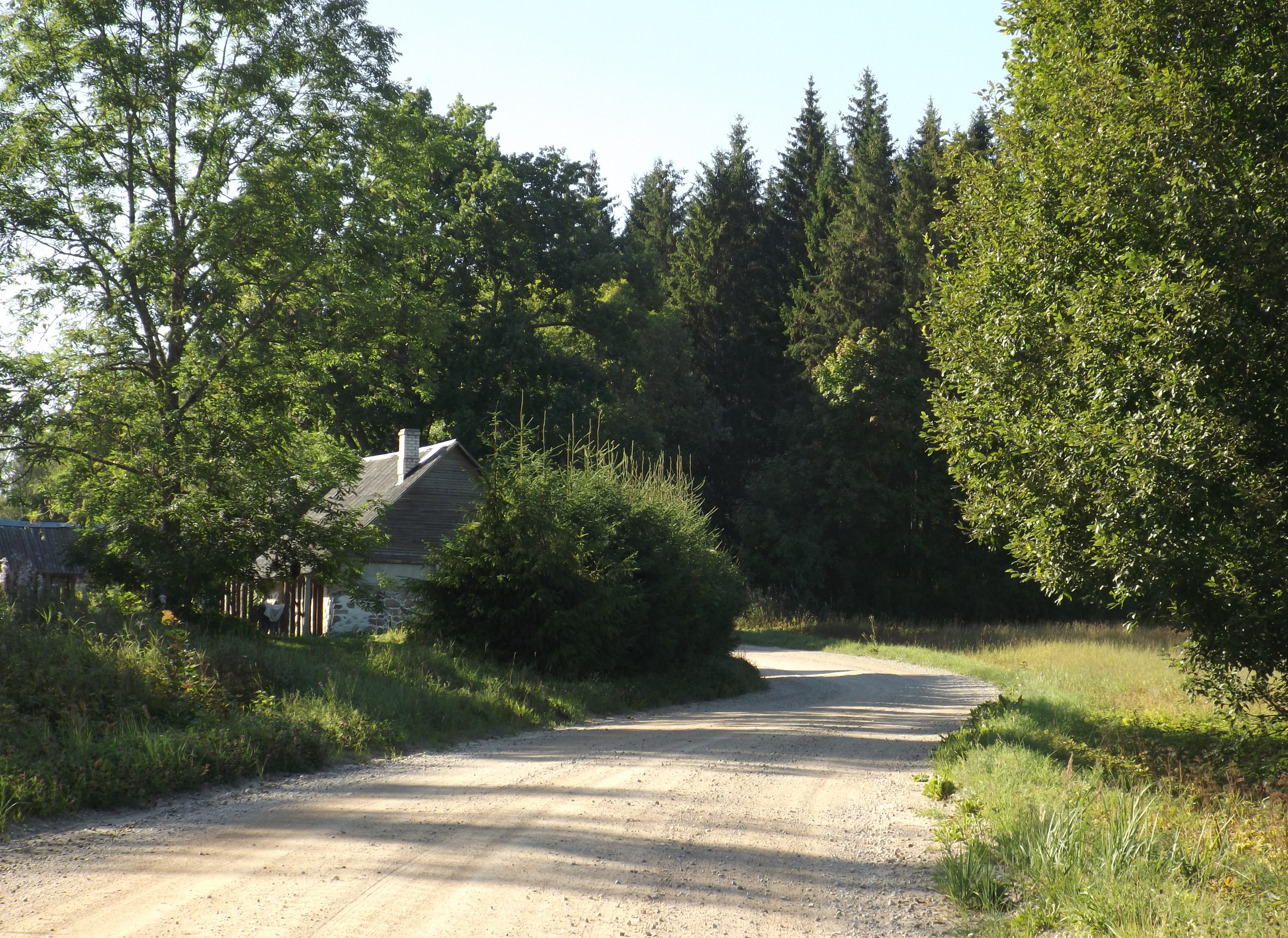

- Location within Estonia
- Coordinates: 57.690555555556°N 27.045°E
- Country: Estonia
- County: Võru County
- Parish: Rõuge Parish
- Time zone: UTC+2 (EET)
  - Summer (DST): UTC+3 (EEST)

Vänni is a village in Rõuge Parish, Võru County in Estonia.
