= Kuura, Võru County =

Village in Estonia

- Village
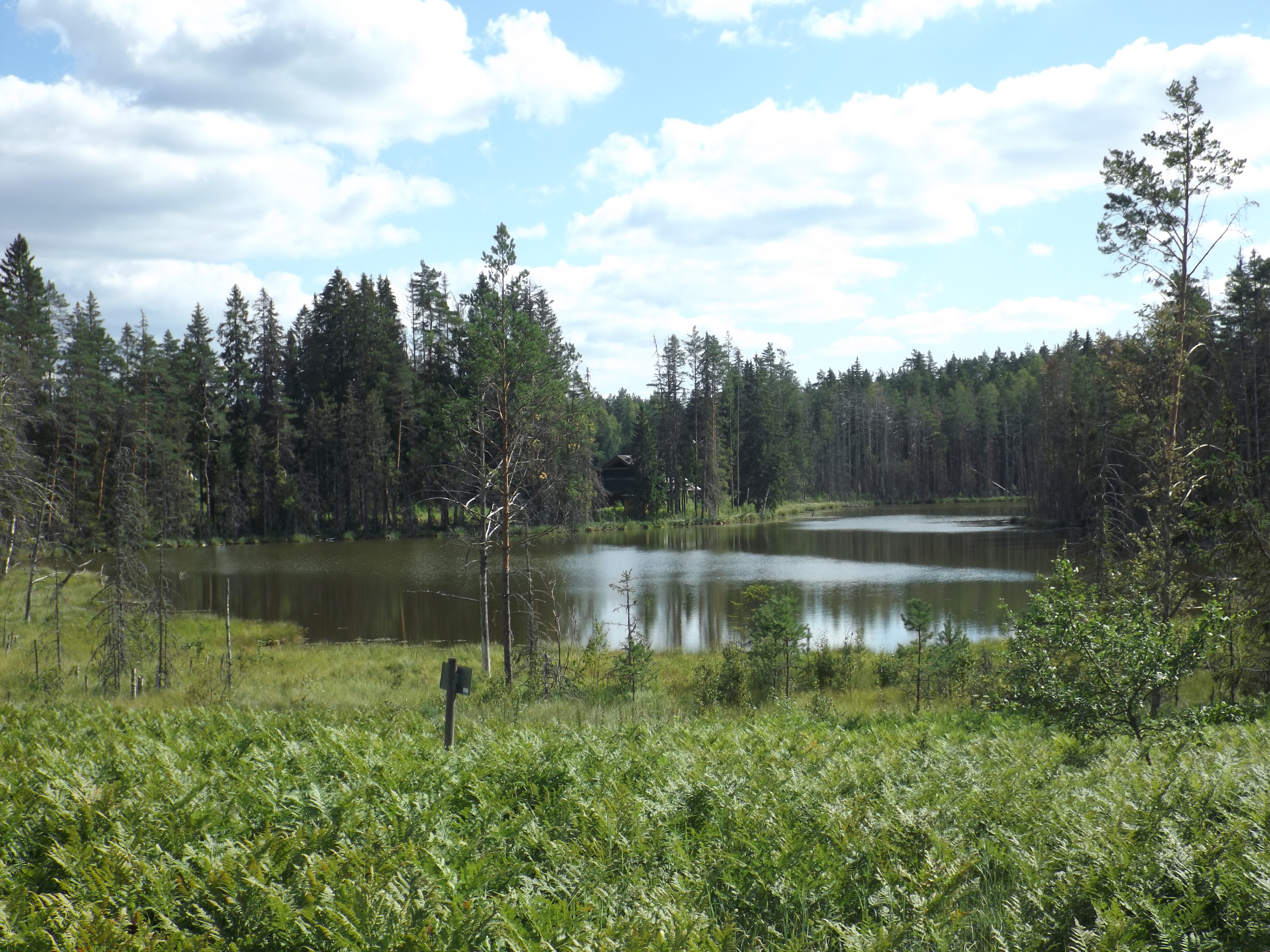
- Lake Kuura Kogrõjärv in Rõuge Parish

- Location within Estonia
- Coordinates: 57.613611111111°N 27.133611111111°E
- Country: Estonia
- County: Võru County
- Parish: Rõuge Parish
- Time zone: UTC+2 (EET)
  - Summer (DST): UTC+3 (EEST)

Kuura is a village in Rõuge Parish, Võru County in Estonia.
