= Ala-Tilga =

Village in Võru County, Estonia

- Village
- Location in Estonia
- Coordinates: 57°45′12″N 27°04′27″E
- Country: Estonia
- County: Võru County
- Municipality: Rõuge Parish

Population (2021)
  - Total: 4

Ala-Tilga is a village in Rõuge Parish, Võru County in southeastern Estonia. The population has been 4 since 2021.
