= Varstu Parish =

Former municipality of Estonia

Coordinates: 57°38′36″N 26°39′35″E

Varstu Parish Varstu vald
- Former municipality of Estonia
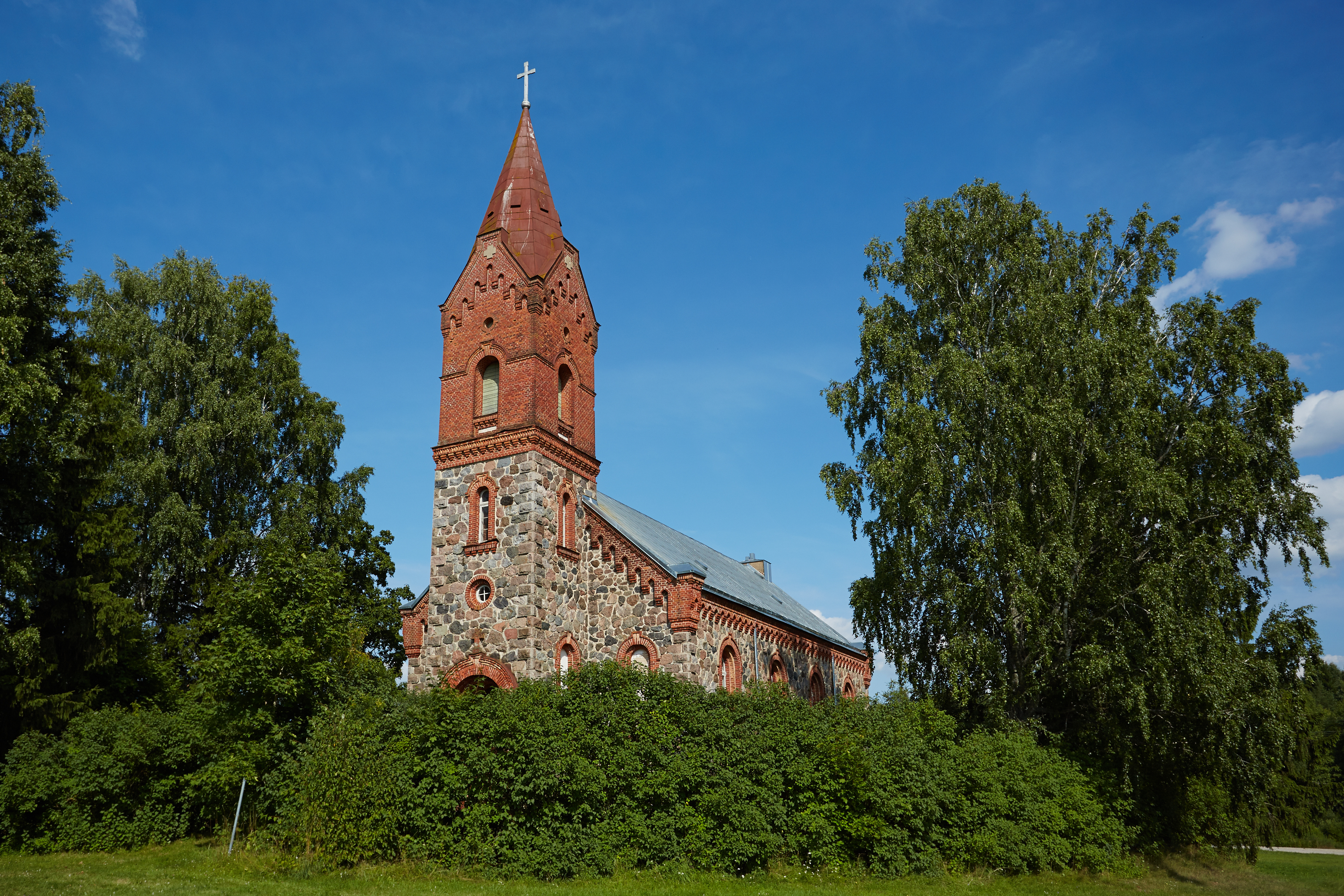
- Roosa church

- Flag Coat of arms

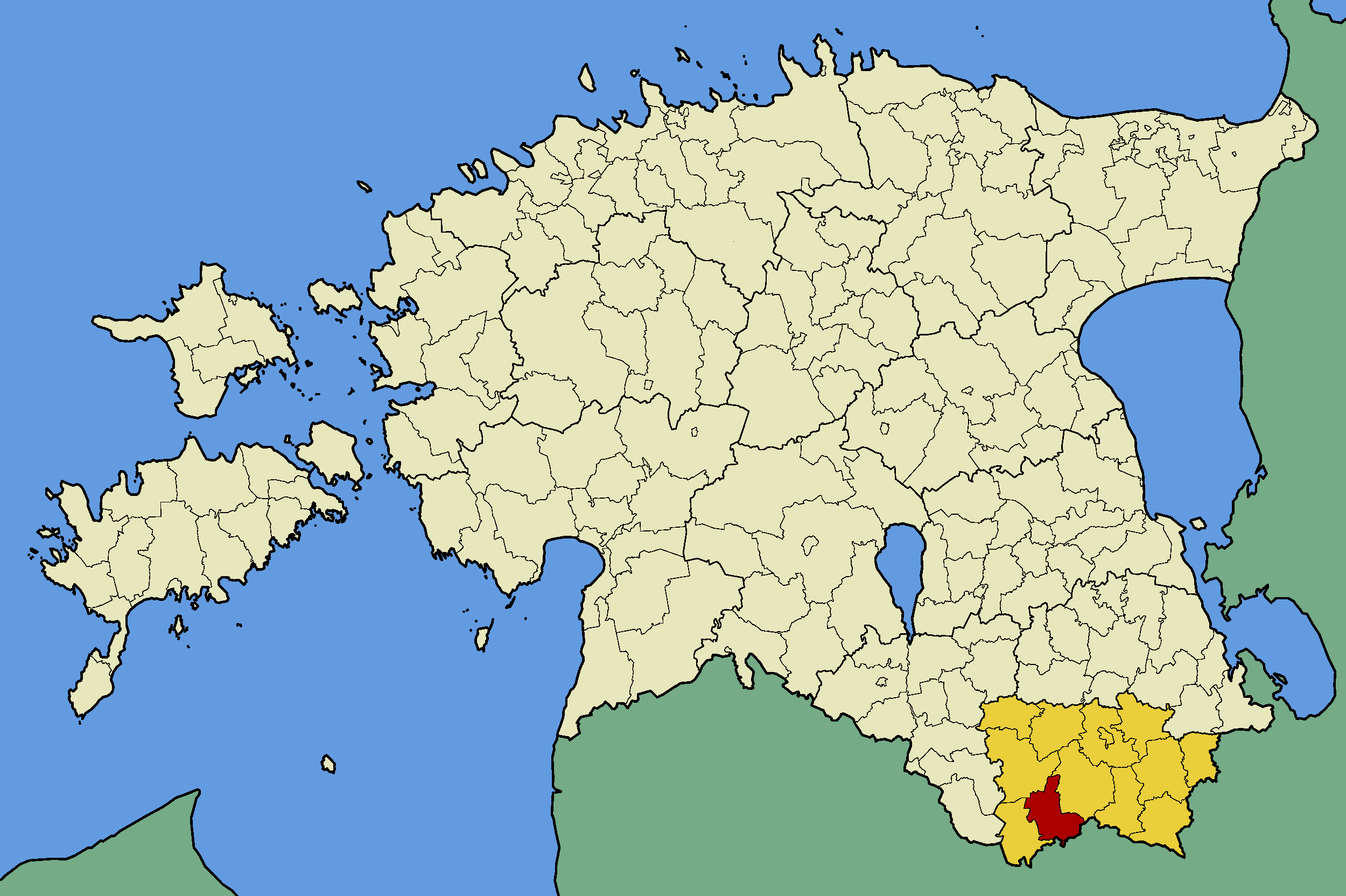
- Varstu Parish within Võru County.
- Country: Estonia
- County: Võru County
- Established: 1991
- Merged into expanded Rõuge Parish: 21 October 2017
- Administrative centre: Varstu

Area
  - Total: 170.63 km^{2} (65.88 sq mi)

Population (01.01.2009)
  - Total: 1,272
  - Density: 7.455/km^{2} (19.31/sq mi)
- Website: varstu.kovtp.ee

Varstu Parish (Estonian: Varstu vald) was a rural municipality of Estonia, in Võru County. It had a population of 1,272 (as of 1 January 2009) and an area of 170.63 km².

In 2017, it merged with Rõuge Parish, Haanja Parish, Mõniste Parish, and Misso Parish to create a new entity. It retained the Rõuge Parish name.

== Settlements ==
Small borough

Varstu

Villages

Hintsiko - Kangsti - Kõrgepalu - Krabi - Laurimäe - Liguri - Lüütsepa - Matsi - Metstaga - Mutemetsa - Paganamaa - Pähni - Punsa - Raudsepa - Soolätte - Tagakolga - Vana-Roosa - Viru
