= Kallaste (disambiguation) =

Kallaste is a town in Tartu County, Estonia.

Kallaste may also refer to:

== Places ==
- Kallaste, Kihelkonna Parish, a village in Saare County, Estonia
- Kallaste, Muhu Parish, a village in Saare County, Estonia
- Kallaste, Haanja Parish, a village in Haanja, Võru County, Estonia
- Kallaste, Mõniste Parish, a village in Mõniste, Võru County, Estonia

== Other uses ==
- Kallaste (surname)
