= Mõisamõtsa Nature Reserve =

Protected area in Estonia

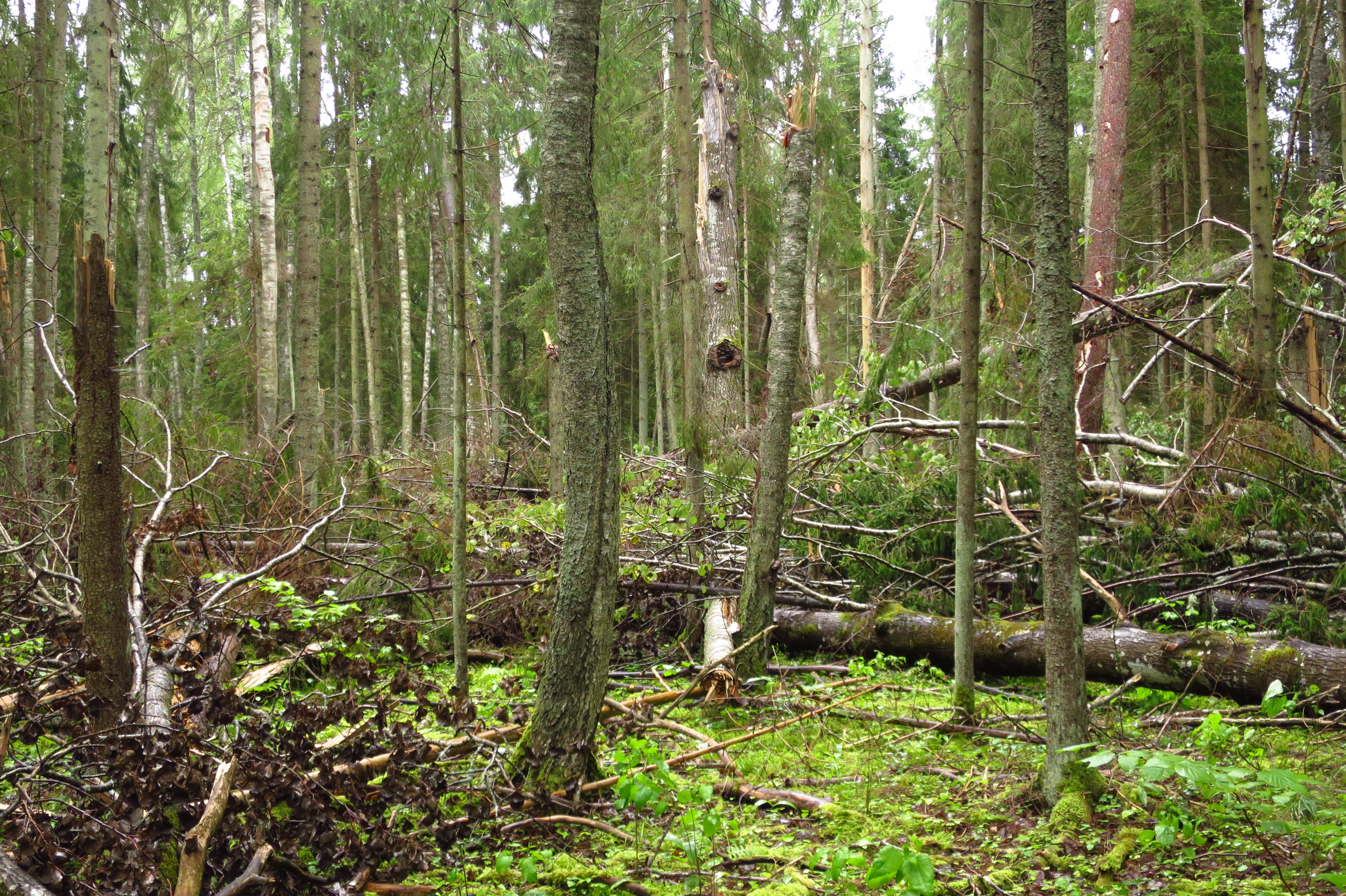

- Location within Estonia
- Location: Estonia
- Coordinates: 57°35′N 26°40′E
- Area: 224 ha (550 acres)
- Established: 2005

Mõisamõtsa Nature Reserve is a nature reserve which is located in Võru County, Estonia.

The area of the nature reserve is 224 ha.

The protected area was founded in 2005 to protect valuable habitat types and threatened species in Tundu village (former Mõniste Parish) and Pähni village (former Varstu Parish).
