= Raudsepa =

Raudsepa may refer to several places in Estonia:

- Raudsepa, Valga County, village in Otepää Parish, Valga County
- Raudsepa, Rõuge Parish, village in Rõuge Parish, Võru County
- Raudsepa, Võru Parish, village in Võru Parish, Võru County

== See also ==
- Raudsepä, village in Rõuge Parish, Võru County
