= Pähni Nature Reserve =

Nature reserve in Estonia

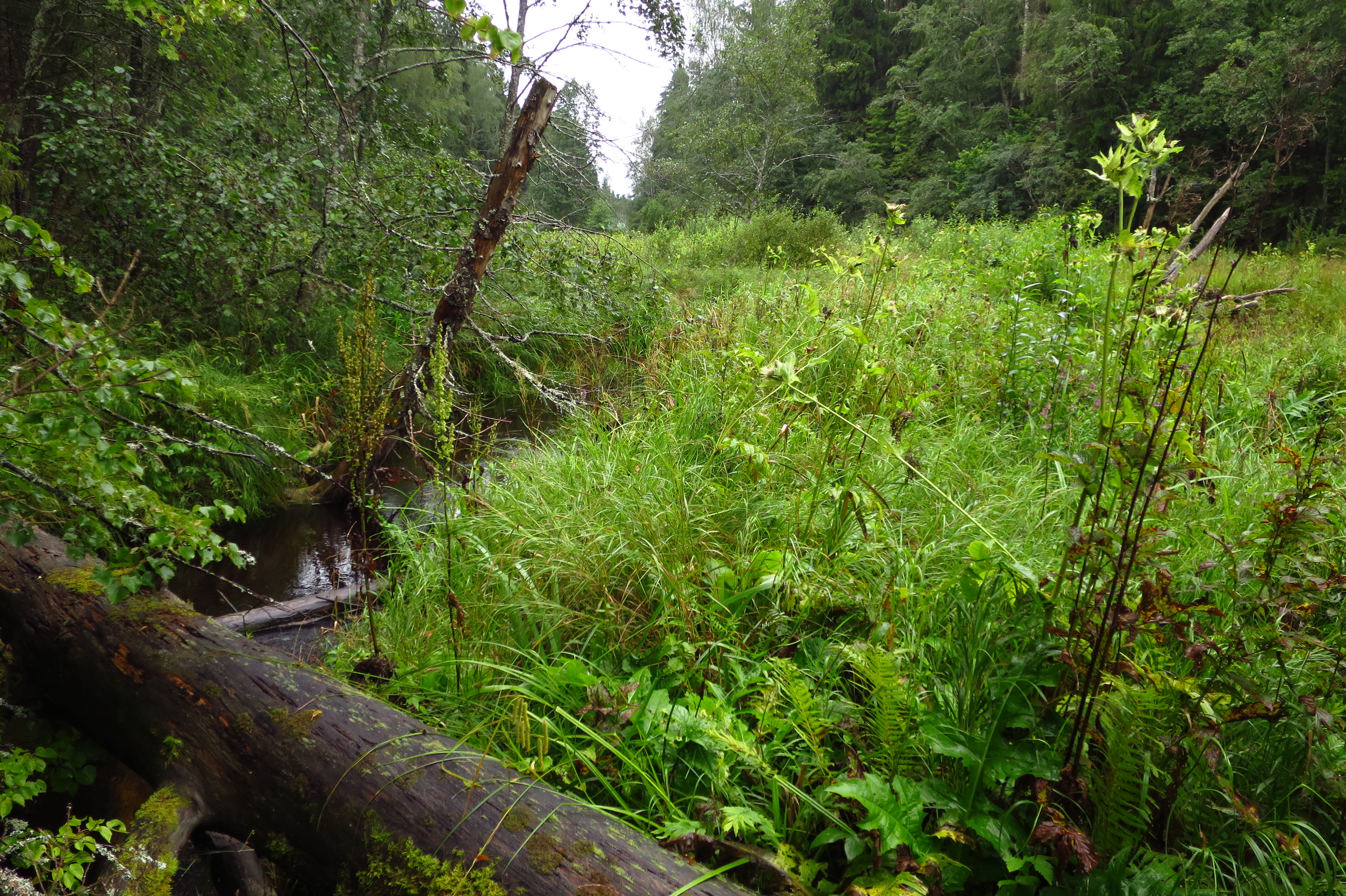

- Location within Estonia
- Location: Estonia
- Coordinates: 57°38′N 26°47′E
- Area: 278 ha (690 acres)
- Established: 2006 (2013)

Pähni Nature Reserve is a nature reserve which is located in Võru County, Estonia.

The area of the nature reserve is 278 ha (690 acres).

The protected area was founded in 2006 to protect valuable habitat types and threatened species in Pähni village (former Varstu Parish) and Sadramõtsa village (Rõuge Parish).
