= Roosa =

Roosa, could refer to:

== People ==
- Roosa Koskelo, Finnish volleyball player
- Roosa Timonen, Finnish tennis player
- Daniel Bennett St. John Roosa, American physician
- Robert Roosa, American economist and banker
- Stuart Roosa, NASA astronaut

== Places ==
- Rõõsa, a village in Kose Parish, Harju County in northern Estonia
- Röösa, a village in Saaremaa Parish, Saare County in western Estonia
- Vana-Roosa (locally known as Roosa), a settlement in Rõuge Parish, Võru County in southeastern Estonia
- Vastse-Roosa, a village in Rõuge Parish, Võru County in southeastern Estonia

== Fictional characters ==
- General Manie Roosa, a character in James Rollins and Grant Blackwood's novel The Kill Switch (2014), who their epilogue states is "very loosely based on the real-life Boer leader Manie Maritz"
