= Hüti =

Hüti may refer to several places in Estonia:

- Hüti, Hiiu County, village in Hiiu Parish, Hiiu County
- Hüti, Võru County, village in Mõniste Parish, Võru County

== See also ==
- Huti (disambiguation)
