= Huti =

Huti may refer to:

- Hüti, Hiiu County, a village in Hiiu Parish, Hiiu County, Estonia
- Hüti, Võru County, a village in Mõniste Parish, Võru County, Estonia
- Huti, Nepal, a village development committee
- Huti, a village in Farkhar District, Afghanistan

== See also ==
- Hüti (disambiguation)
- Houthis
