= Mõniste Parish =

Former municipality of Estonia

Coordinates: 57°36′45″N 26°36′40″E

Mõniste Parish Mõniste vald (in Estonian) Mõnistõ vald (in Võro)
- Former municipality of Estonia
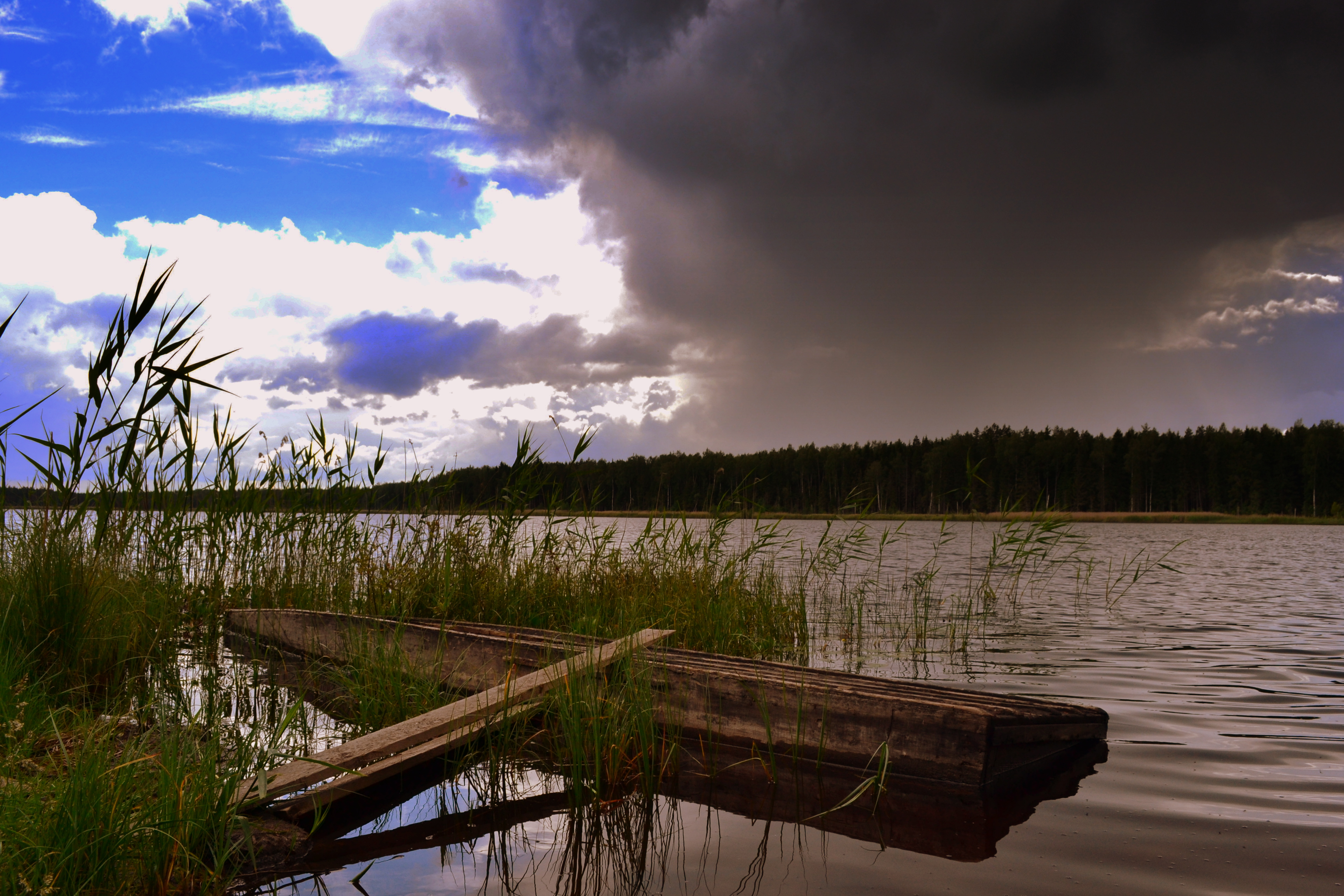
- Ubajärv lake in Koemetsa

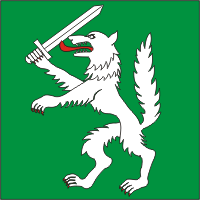
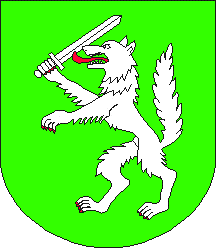
- Flag Coat of arms

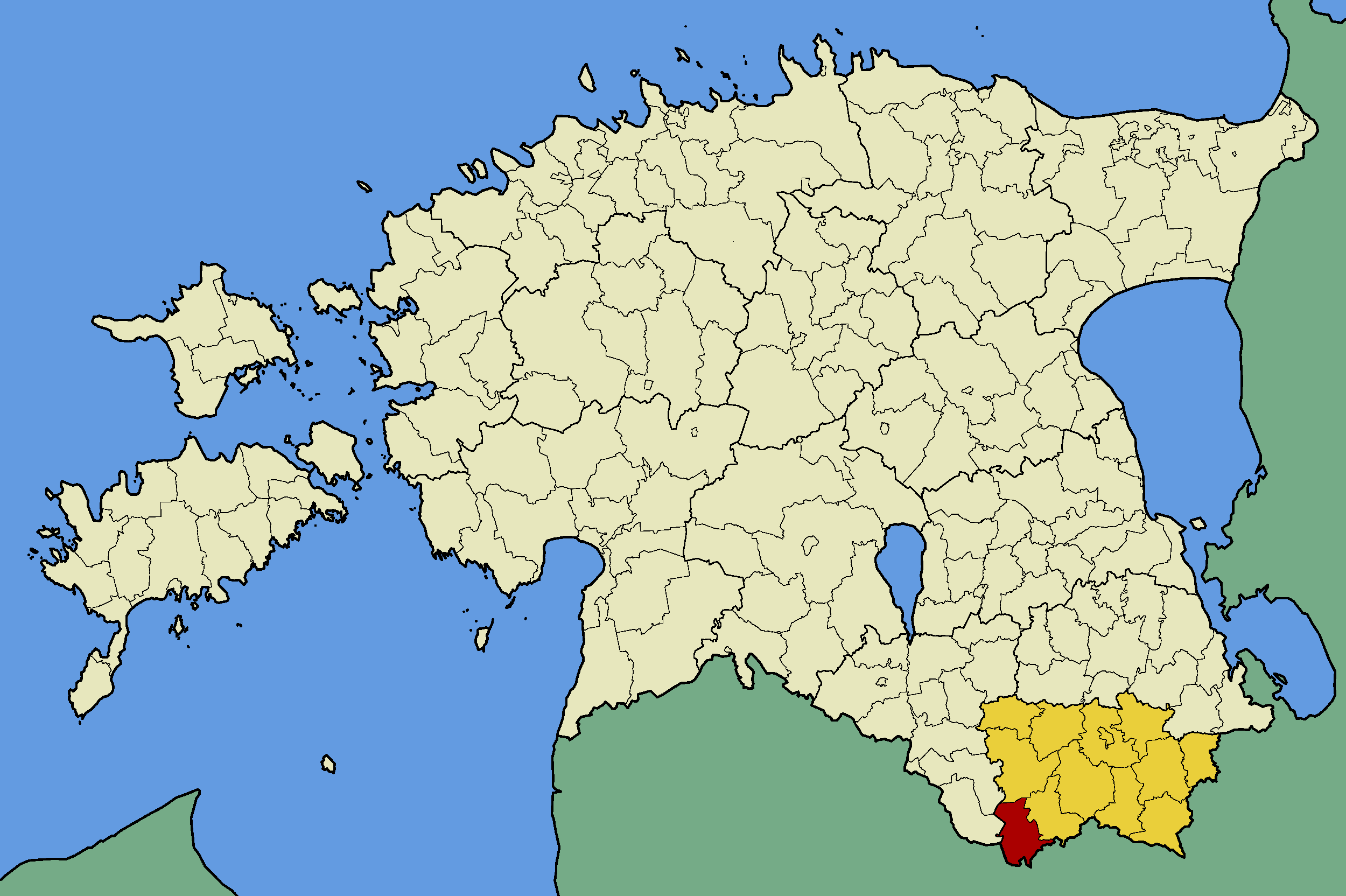
- Mõniste Parish within Võru County.
- Country: Estonia
- County: Võru County
- Established: 1991
- Merged into expanded Rõuge Parish: 21 October 2017
- Administrative centre: Mõniste

Area
  - Total: 174.8 km^{2} (67.5 sq mi)

Population (01.01.2006)
  - Total: 1,031
  - Density: 5.898/km^{2} (15.28/sq mi)
- Website: www.moniste.ee

Mõniste Parish (Estonian: Mõniste vald; Võro: Mõnistõ vald) was a rural municipality in Võru County, southeastern Estonia.

In 2017, it merged with Rõuge Parish, Haanja Parish, Misso Parish, and Varstu Parish to create a new entity. It retained the Rõuge Parish name.

== Settlements ==
Villages

Hürova - Hüti - Kallaste - Karisöödi - Koemetsa - Kuutsi - Mõniste - Parmupalu - Peebu - Sakurgi - Saru - Singa - Tiitsa - Tundu - Tursa - Vastse-Roosa - Villike

== Visitor attractions ==
Mõniste Peasant Museum is located in Kuutsi village.

== Twin towns ==
- Kaavi, Finland
