= Paganamaa Landscape Conservation Area =

Protected area in Estonia

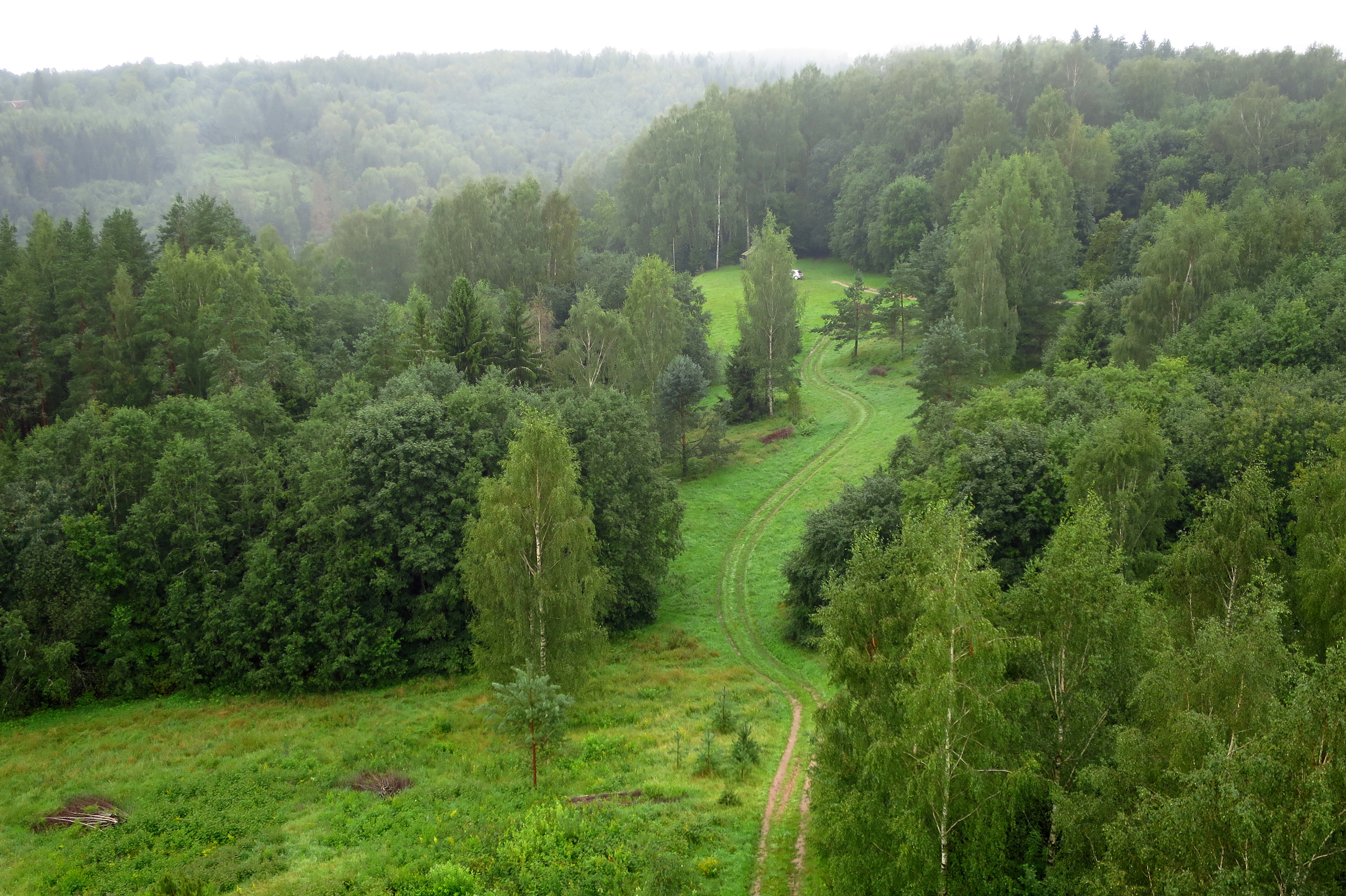

- Location within Estonia
- Location: Estonia
- Coordinates: 57°35′N 26°48′E
- Area: 1,030 ha (2,500 acres)
- Established: 1979 (2005)

Paganamaa Landscape Conservation Area is a nature park which is located in Võru County, Estonia.

The area of the nature park is 1030 ha.

The protected area was founded in 1979 to protect natural and cultural landscapes in the villages of Paganamaa, Pähni, Tagakolga and Liguri. In 2005, the protected area was designated to the landscape conservation area.
