= Matsi =

Matsi may refer to several places in Estonia:

- Matsi, Pärnu County, village in Lääneranna Parish, Pärnu County
- Matsi, Võru County, village in Rõuge Parish, Võru County
- Matsi, former name of Rõuge-Matsi, village in Rõuge Parish, Võru County
