= Hüti Nature Reserve =

Protected area in Estonia

- Location within Estonia
- Location: Estonia
- Coordinates: 58°55′00″N 22°28′30″E
- Area: 31 hectares (77 acres)
- Established: 2013

Hüti Nature Reserve is a nature reserve which is located in Hiiu County, Estonia.

The area of the nature reserve is 31 hectares (77 acres).

The protected area was founded in 2013 to protect valuable habitat types and threatened species in Hüti village (former Kõrgessaare Parish).
