= Tundu, Estonia =

Village in Estonia

Tundu
- Location within Estonia
- Coordinates: 57°35′0″N 26°38′0″E
- Country: Estonia
- County: Võru County
- Municipality: Rõuge Parish
- Time zone: UTC+2 (EET)

Tundu is a village in Rõuge Parish, Võru County in southeastern Estonia. Between 1991–2017 (until the administrative reform of Estonian municipalities) the village was located in Mõniste Parish.
