= Väike-Palkna Landscape Conservation Area =

Protected area in Estonia

- Location within Estonia
- Location: Estonia
- Coordinates: 57°36′30″N 26°58′10″E
- Area: 25 ha (62 acres)
- Established: 1979 (2006)

Väike-Palkna Landscape Conservation Area is a nature reserve situated in Võru County, Estonia.

Its area is 24.7 ha.

The protected area was formed in 1979 as a separate part of Paganamaa Landscape Conservation Area. The goal is to protect Väike-Palkna Lake and its surrounding areas. In 2006, the protected area was redesigned to the landscape conservation area.
