= Ubajärv =

Lake in Estonia

- Location within Estonia
- Coordinates: 57°40′N 26°35′E
- Basin countries: Estonia
- Max. length: 1,550 meters (5,090 ft)
- Max. width: 420 meters (1,380 ft)
- Surface area: 38.2 hectares (94 acres)
- Average depth: 1.5 meters (4 ft 11 in)
- Max. depth: 2.1 meters (6 ft 11 in)
- Water volume: 735,000 cubic meters (26,000,000 cu ft)
- Shore length^{1}: 3,070 meters (10,070 ft)
- Surface elevation: 72.4 meters (238 ft)
- ^{1} Shore length is not a well-defined measure.

Ubajärv is a lake in Estonia. It is located in the village of Koemetsa in Rõuge Parish, Võru County. The lake is used for fishing.

== Physical description ==
The lake has an area of 38.2 hectares (94 acres). The lake has an average depth of 1.5 meters (4 ft 11 in) and a maximum depth of 2.1 meters (6 ft 11 in). It is 1,550 meters (5,090 ft) long, and its shoreline measures 3,070 meters (10,070 ft). It has a volume of 429,000 cubic meters (15,100,000 cu ft).

== History ==
During the Soviet occupation of Estonia, when there was a nearby collective farm, ice was cut from the lake and then stored under sawdust and used to cool milk in the summer.

== See also ==
- List of lakes of Estonia
