= Kallaste (surname) =

Family name

Kallaste is an Estonian surname. Notable people with the surname include:

- Ken Kallaste (born 1988), Estonian football player
- Risto Kallaste (born 1971), Estonian football player
- Rudolf Kallaste (1904–1962), Estonian football player
- Toomas Kallaste (born 1971), Estonian football player
