= Sakurgi =

Village in Estonia

- Village
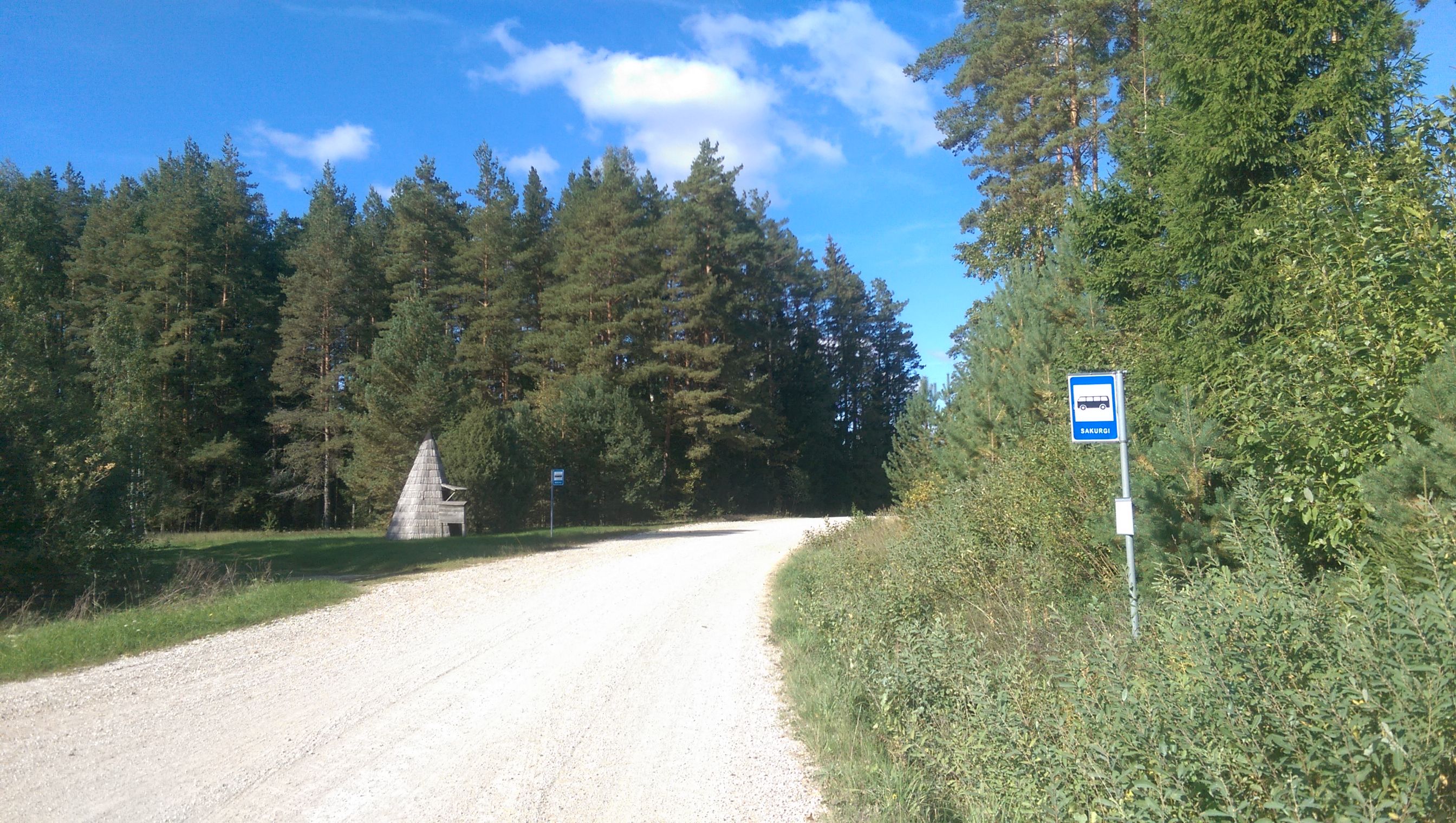
- Bus stop in Sakurgi

- Location within Estonia
- Coordinates: 57°36′50″N 26°32′39″E
- Country: Estonia
- County: Võru County
- Parish: Rõuge Parish
- Time zone: UTC+2 (EET)
  - Summer (DST): UTC+3 (EEST)

Sakurgi is a village in Rõuge Parish, Võru County in southeastern Estonia. Between 1991–2017 (until the administrative reform of Estonian municipalities) the village was located in Mõniste Parish.
