= Krabi, Estonia =

Village in Estonia

Krabi
- Village
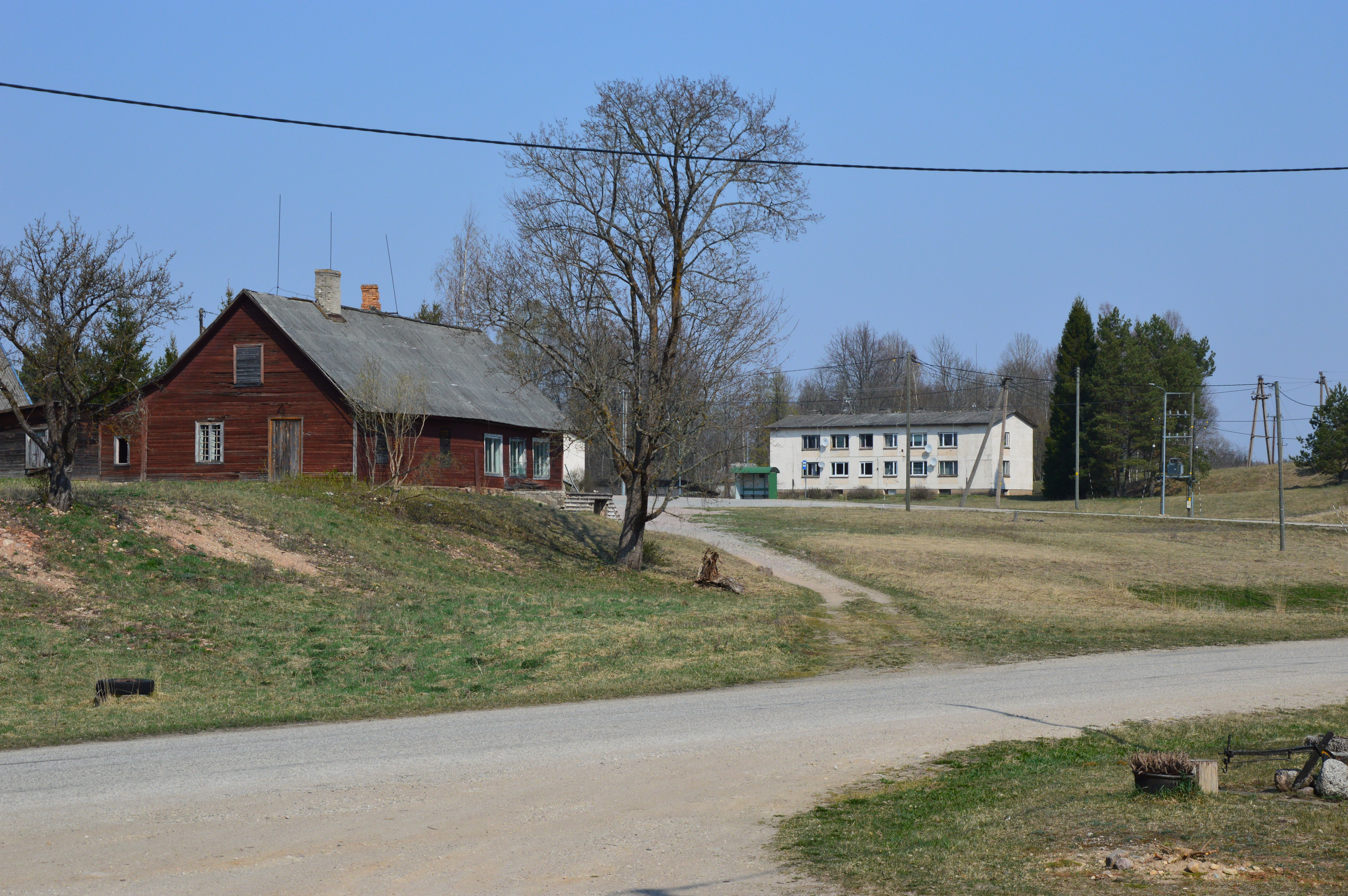
- View from the village tavern

- Location in Estonia
- Coordinates: 57°36′34″N 26°50′02″E
- Country: Estonia
- County: Võru County
- Municipality: Rõuge Parish

Population (2011)
  - Total: 97

Krabi is a village in Rõuge Parish, Võru County, Estonia, on the border with Latvia, near the town of Rõuge. Between 1991 and 2017 (until the administrative reform of Estonian municipalities) the village was located in Varstu Parish.

Krabi was formerly home to Krabi Manor (German:Schönangern; alternately, Grabbenhof). The manor belonged to the Baltic German von Rosen family.

As of 2011, the population of Krabi was 97, a decrease in population from 161 residents during the 2000 census. 95 (97.9%) of the residents were ethnic Estonians. The village has a library, an inn and a restaurant and several shops, with one located in the former manor's granary.

== Krabi School ==
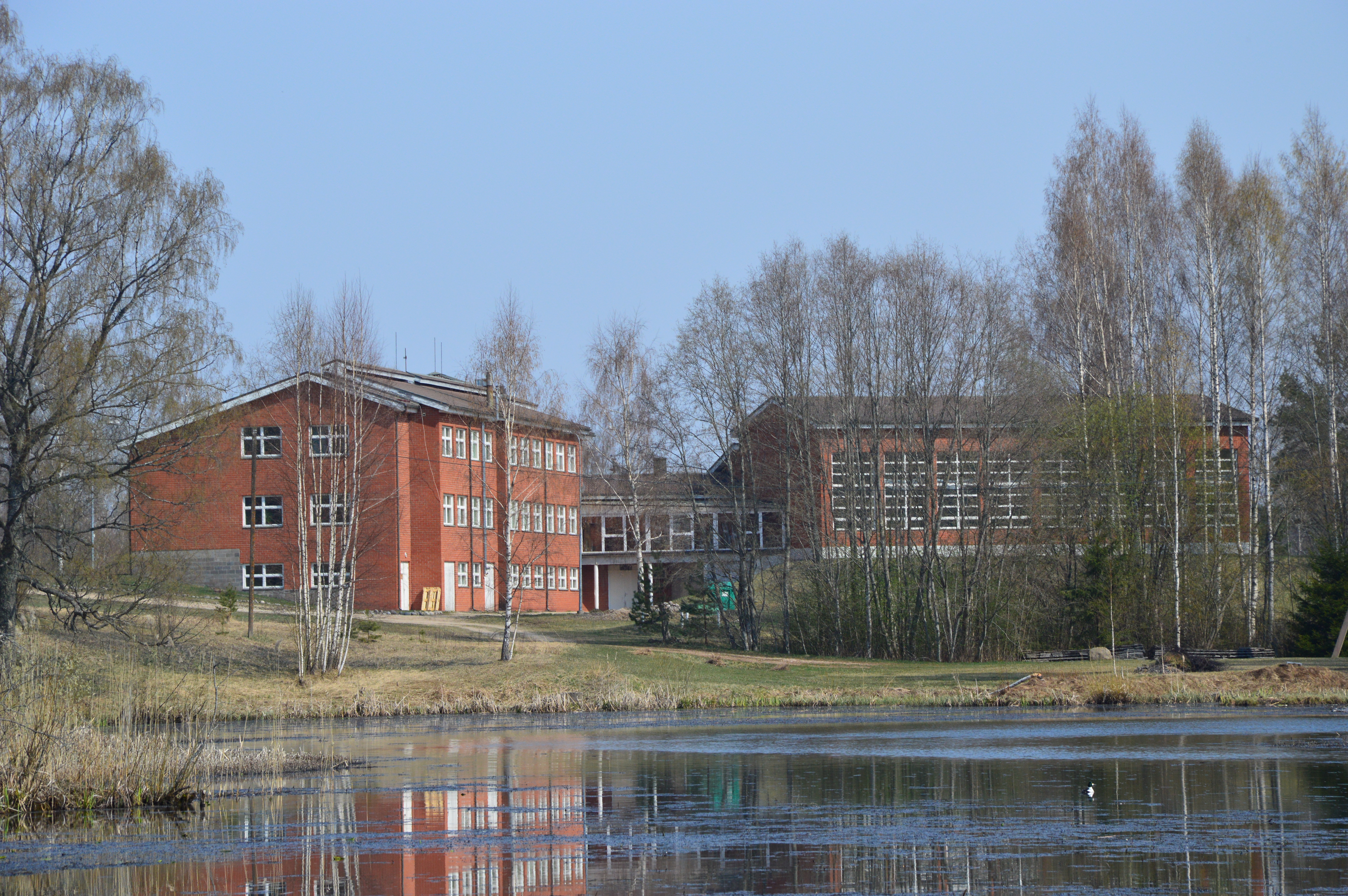
Krabi School, a private day and boarding school for Estonian children with special needs, closed in 2020.

The village was home to Krabi School (Estonian: Krabi Kool), a private school for children with special needs, which opened in 2014 following the closure of the village's primary school when there was a decrease of students from the village and surrounding area, with only four students in attendance. The disabled student population at Krabi School was approximately 65 children who came from all over Estonia, with most of them boarding at the school.

The school was closed in the autumn of 2017 following a criminal investigation into allegations of physical abuse of the students. The director of the school, Ale Sprenk, was charged and prosecuted in a four-day trial, but was acquitted of the charges in court in January 2019. Sprenk resigned and the school reopened in the autumn of 2018.

In February 2020, Krabi School was permanently closed following the Estonian Ministry of Education and Research revocation of the school's license after carrying out state supervision at the school and assessing that school's teaching and educational activities did not meet the requirements set for educational institutions.

== Gallery ==
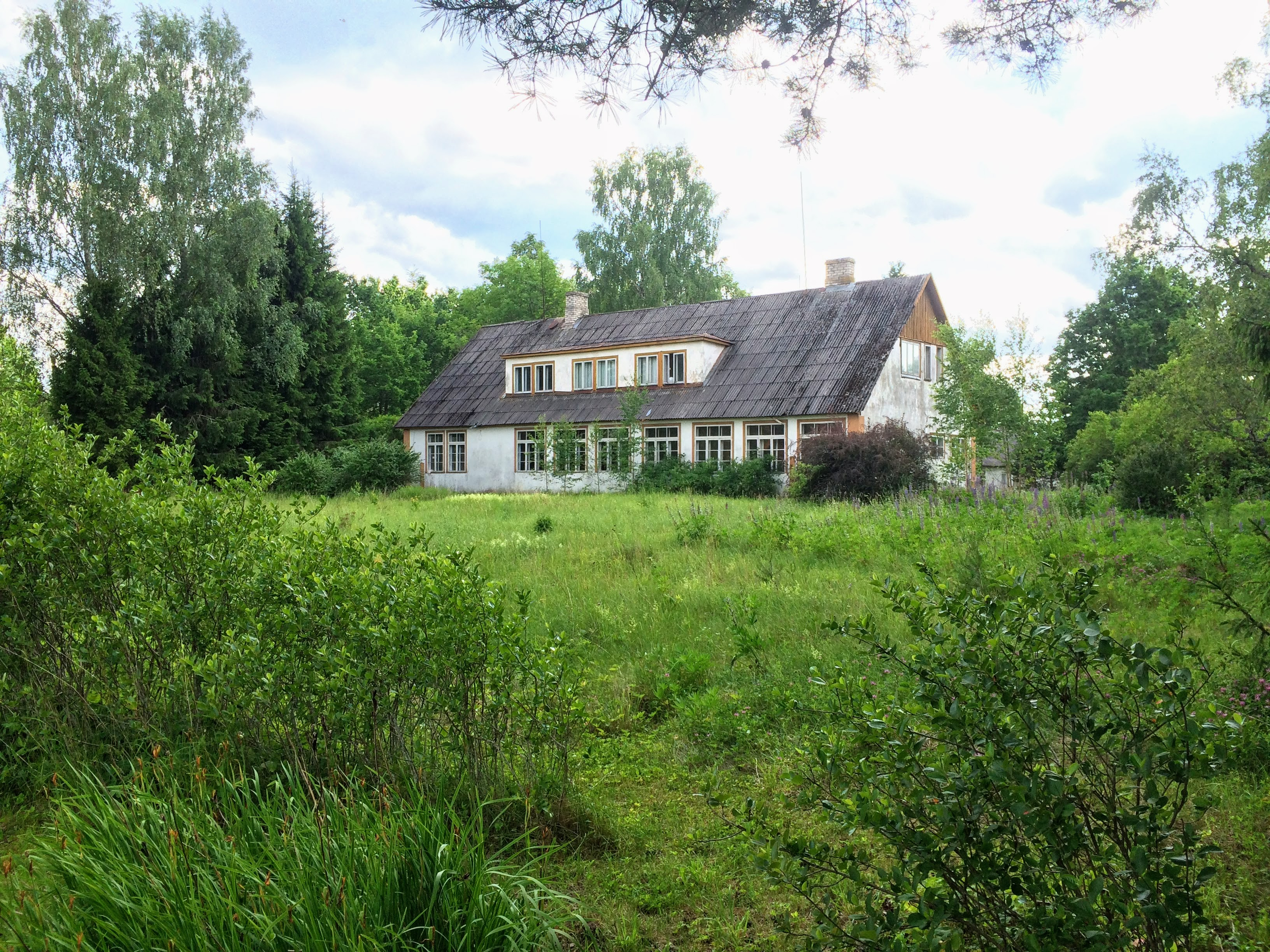
The former village school building, built in 1893 and closed in 2014

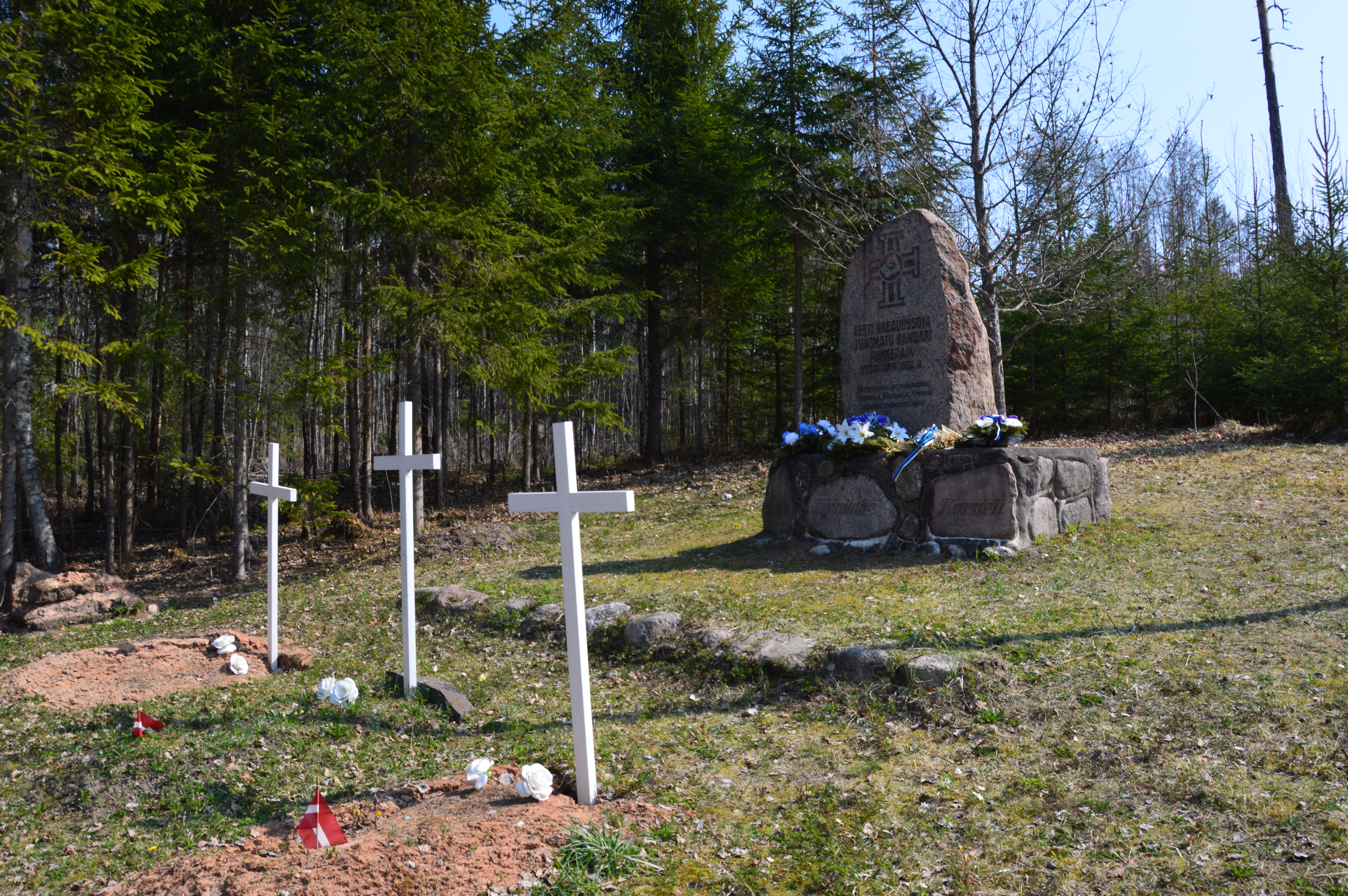
Grave of an unknown Estonian soldier killed during the Estonian War of Independence

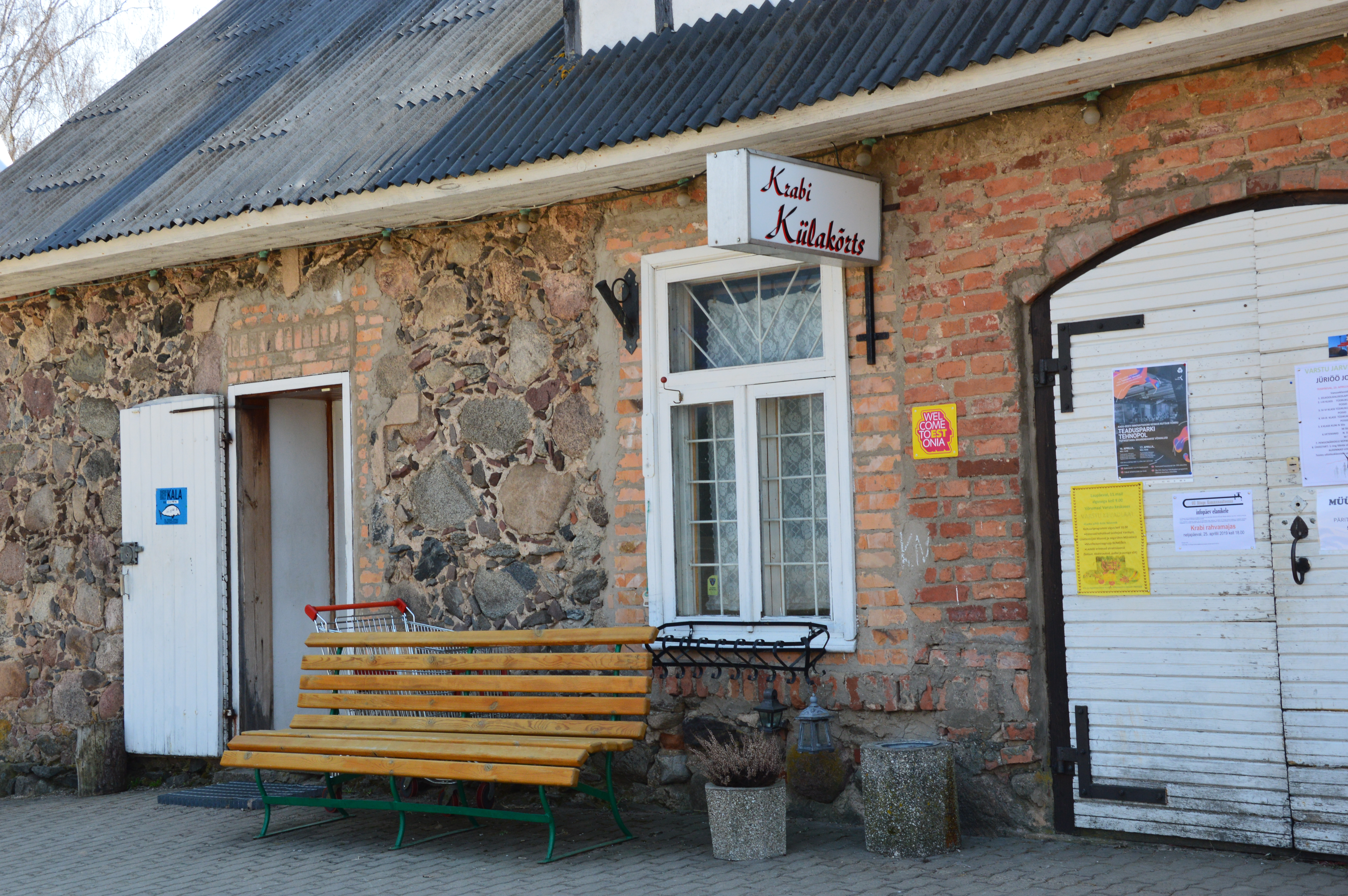
The village tavern
