= Hürova =

Village in Estonia

- Location within Estonia
- Coordinates: 57°37′26″N 26°35′38″E
- Country: Estonia
- County: Võru County
- Municipality: Rõuge Parish
- Time zone: UTC+2 (EET)

Hürova (Võro: Hürüvä) is a village in Rõuge Parish, Võru County in southeastern Estonia. Between 1991 and 2017 (until the administrative reform of Estonian municipalities) the village was located in Mõniste Parish.
