= Varstu Airfield =

Airfield in Estonia

Varstu Airfield (Estonian: Varstu lennuväli; ICAO: EEVU) is an airfield in Varstu, Võru County, Estonia.

The airfield was built in 1976 or 1977 by Soviet Union. The airfield was used for agricultural activities and general aviation usage that was run by local Aeroflot group. In the beginning of 1990s, the airfield was abandoned. The airfield was officially re-opened in 2008. The next year (2009) the airfield got an repaved runway using gravel. Since then the airfield has been a remarkable place due to it being the smallest Estonian airfield with an paved runway.
