= Kuutsi =

Village in Estonia

- Village
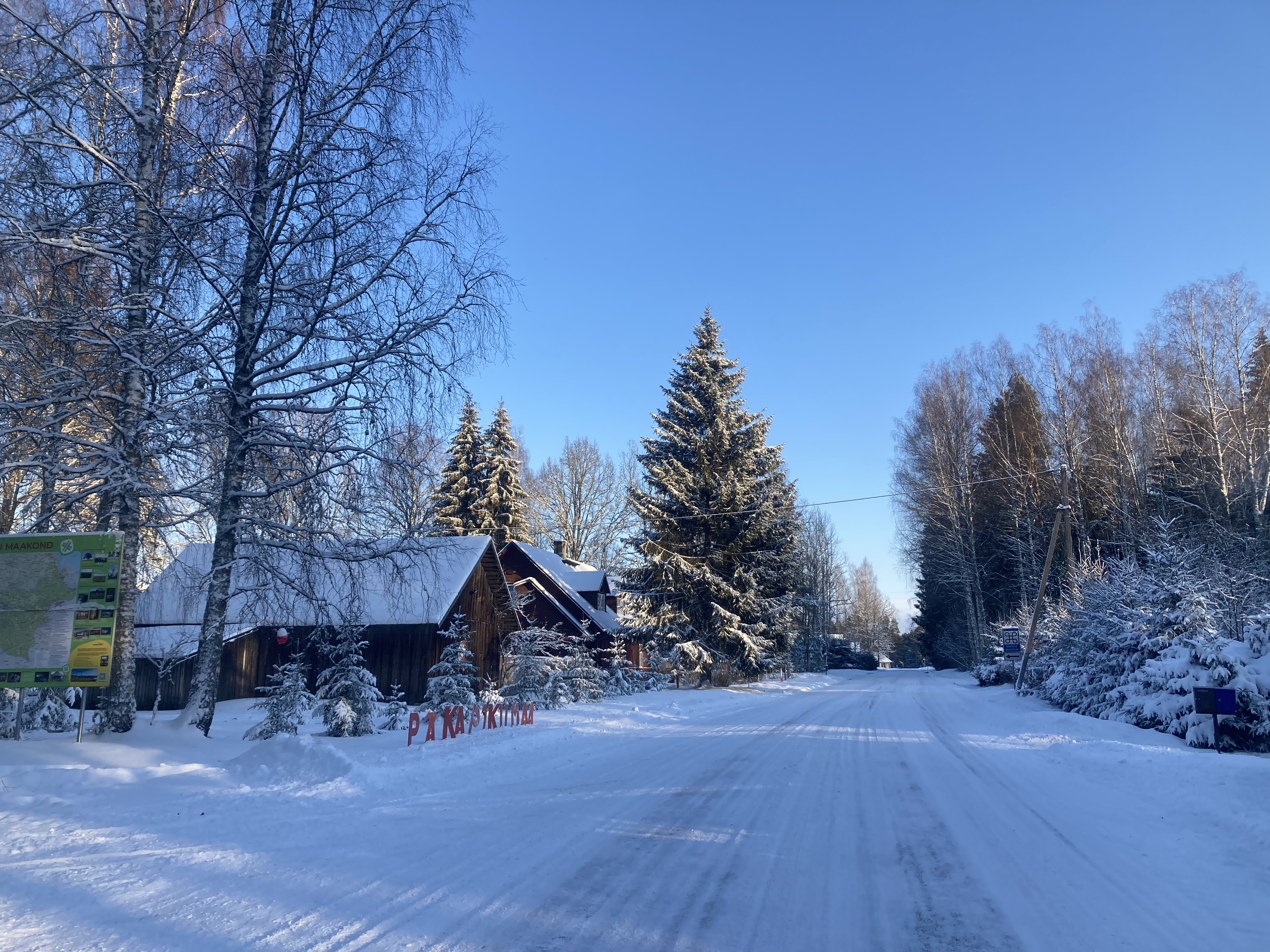

- Location within Estonia
- Coordinates: 57°35′0″N 26°32′0″E
- Country: Estonia
- County: Võru County
- Parish: Rõuge Parish
- Time zone: UTC+2 (EET)
  - Summer (DST): UTC+3 (EEST)

Kuutsi (Võro: Kuudsi) is a village in Rõuge Parish, Võru County in southeastern Estonia. Between 1991–2017 (until the administrative reform of Estonian municipalities) the village was located in Mõniste Parish.

Kuutsi is the location of Mõniste Peasant Museum.
