= Metstaga =

Village in Estonia

- Location within Estonia
- Coordinates: 57°38′41″N 26°45′10″E
- Country: Estonia
- County: Võru County

Population (2019)
  - Total: 20
- Time zone: UTC+2 (EET)

Metstaga is a settlement in Varstu Parish, Võru County in southeastern Estonia.
