= Vello Helk =

Danish historian

Vello Helk (23 September 1923, in Varstu, Estonia – 14 March 2014) was an eminent Danish historian of Estonian origin.

Helk was mobilized in the German army in 1944 and was forced to go to Germany. From there he fled to Denmark in 1945, where he attended the University of Århus from 1947, where he studied history, Latin and German. He concentrated on the history of Northern Europe in the 16th and 17th centuries, and his main work was about the Norwegian Jesuit Laurentius Nicolai, who tried to re-catholicize Scandinavia. He also has written an extensive survey about the Jesuits in Tartu and had studied the history of Scandinavian students in Southern European universities from 1536 to 1864. He is also interested in Danish-Estonian contacts, especially in the 16th Century, and also during the Estonian War of Independence. Helk's main works are written in German or Danish and some of them are also translated to Estonian.

Helk worked for over 30 years (1959–1990) in the Danish National Archives, where he was leader of the 4th section from 1970 to 1990, and in 1978–1979 he was the deputy main archivist of Denmark. In 1990 he retired.

In 1996 Vello Helk was awarded an honorary doctorate degree by the University of Tartu.
