= Vastse-Roosa =

Village in Estonia

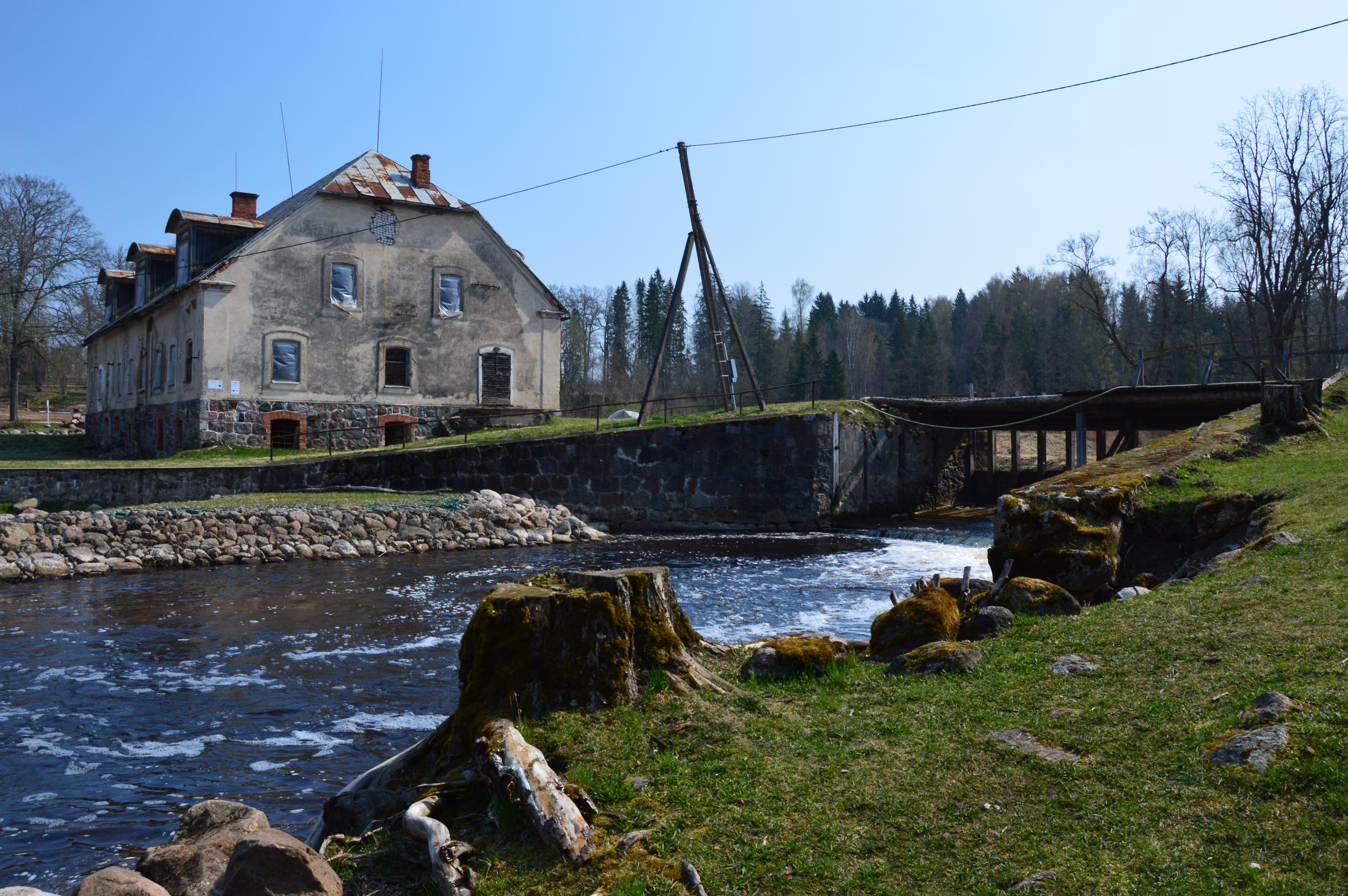
- Vastse-Roosa mill

- Location within Estonia
- Coordinates: 57°34′0″N 26°40′0″E
- Country: Estonia
- County: Võru County
- Municipality: Rõuge Parish
- Time zone: UTC+2 (EET)
- Website: https://vastseroosa.vorumaa.eu/

Vastse-Roosa (Võro: Vahtsõ-Roosa) is a village in Rõuge Parish, Võru County, Estonia. Between 1991 and 2017 (until the administrative reform of Estonian municipalities) the village was located in Mõniste Parish.
