= Rudolf Kallaste =

Estonian footballer (1904–1964)

Rudolf Kallaste (until 1923 Besfamilie; 5 July 1904 – 20 April 1962) was an Estonian footballer.

He was born in Tallinn.

He began his football career at the age of 14 when he joined with the sport club JK Tallinna Kalev. Later he joined with club Tallinna Football Club (Estonian: Tallinna Jalgpalli Klubi), which won Estonian championships in 1926. His career ended in 1932. 1927–1929 he was a member of Estonian national football team; in total 10 appearances.

In 1930 he was one of the founders of football club JS Estonia. In 1930s with friend Ernst Joll, he published magazine Sport ja Auto.
