= Laurimäe =

Village in Estonia

Laurimae
- Location within Estonia
- Coordinates: 57°36′0″N 26°39′0″E
- Country: Estonia
- County: Võru County
- Time zone: UTC+2 (EET)

Laurimäe is a settlement in Rõuge Parish, Võru County in southeastern Estonia.
