= Kõrgepalu =

Village in Estonia

- Location within Estonia
- Coordinates: 57°42′38″N 26°42′52″E
- Country: Estonia
- County: Võru County
- Time zone: UTC+2 (EET)

Kõrgepalu is a village in Rõuge Parish, Võru County in southeastern Estonia.
