= Sadramõtsa =

Village in Estonia

Sadrametsa
- Location within Estonia
- Coordinates: 57°39′30″N 26°48′26″E
- Country: Estonia
- County: Võru County
- Time zone: UTC+2 (EET)

Sadrametsa is a settlement in Rõuge Parish, Võru County in southeastern Estonia.
