= Kangsti =

Village in Estonia

- Location within Estonia
- Coordinates: 57°41′13″N 26°43′43″E
- Country: Estonia
- County: Võru County
- Time zone: UTC+2 (EET)

Kangsti is a village in the Rõuge Parish of Võru County, Estonia.

== Gallery ==
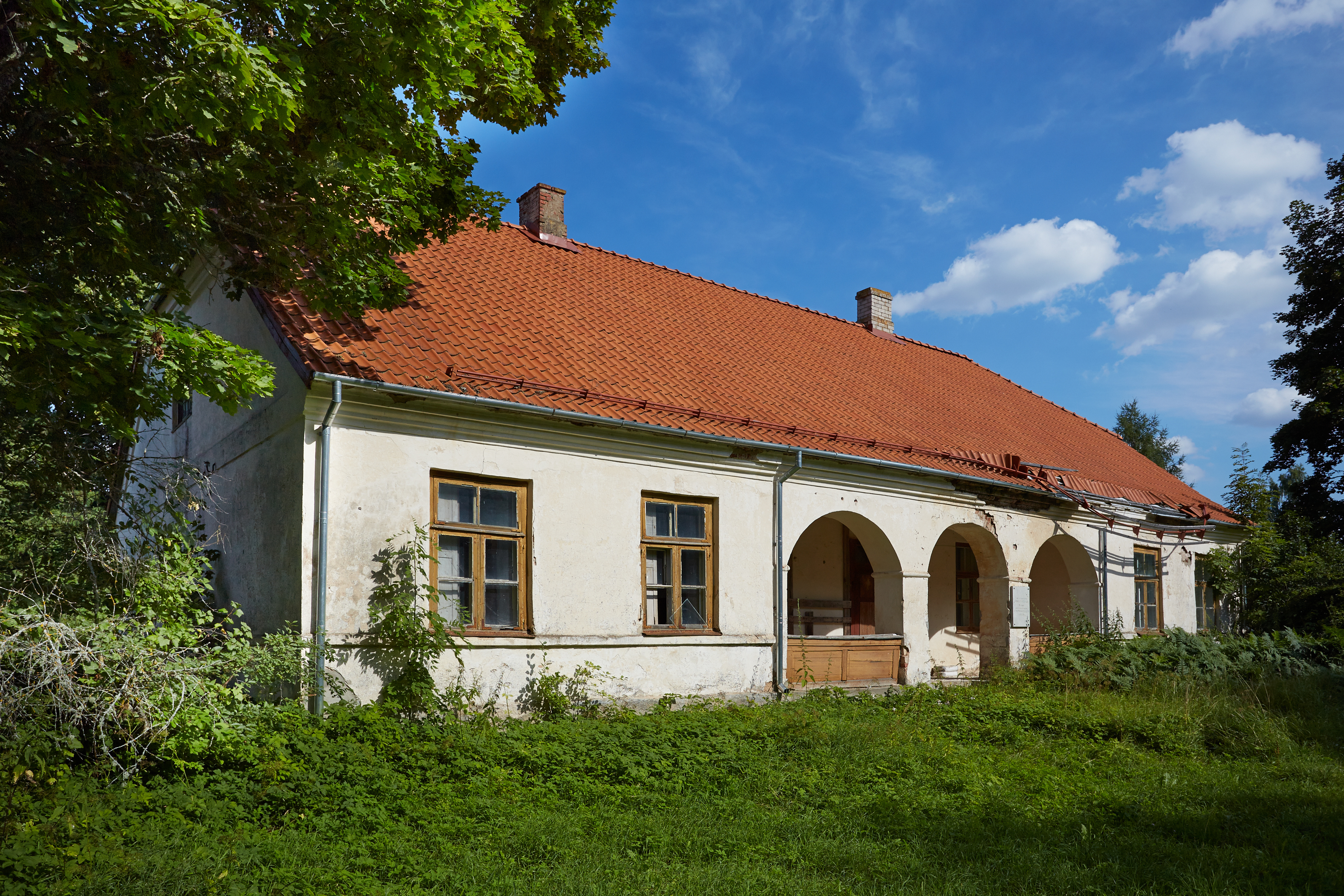
Old Sänna postal station
