= Varstu =

Borough in Estonia

- Location within Estonia
- Coordinates: 57°38′21″N 26°39′35″E
- Country: Estonia
- County: Võru County
- Municipality: Rõuge Parish
- Time zone: UTC+2 (EET)

Varstu is a small borough (Estonian: alevik) in Rõuge Parish, Võru County in southeastern Estonia. Between 1991 and 2017 (until the administrative reform of Estonian municipalities) the it was the administrative centre of Varstu Parish.

Varstu is the birthplace of historian Vello Helk (1923–2014).

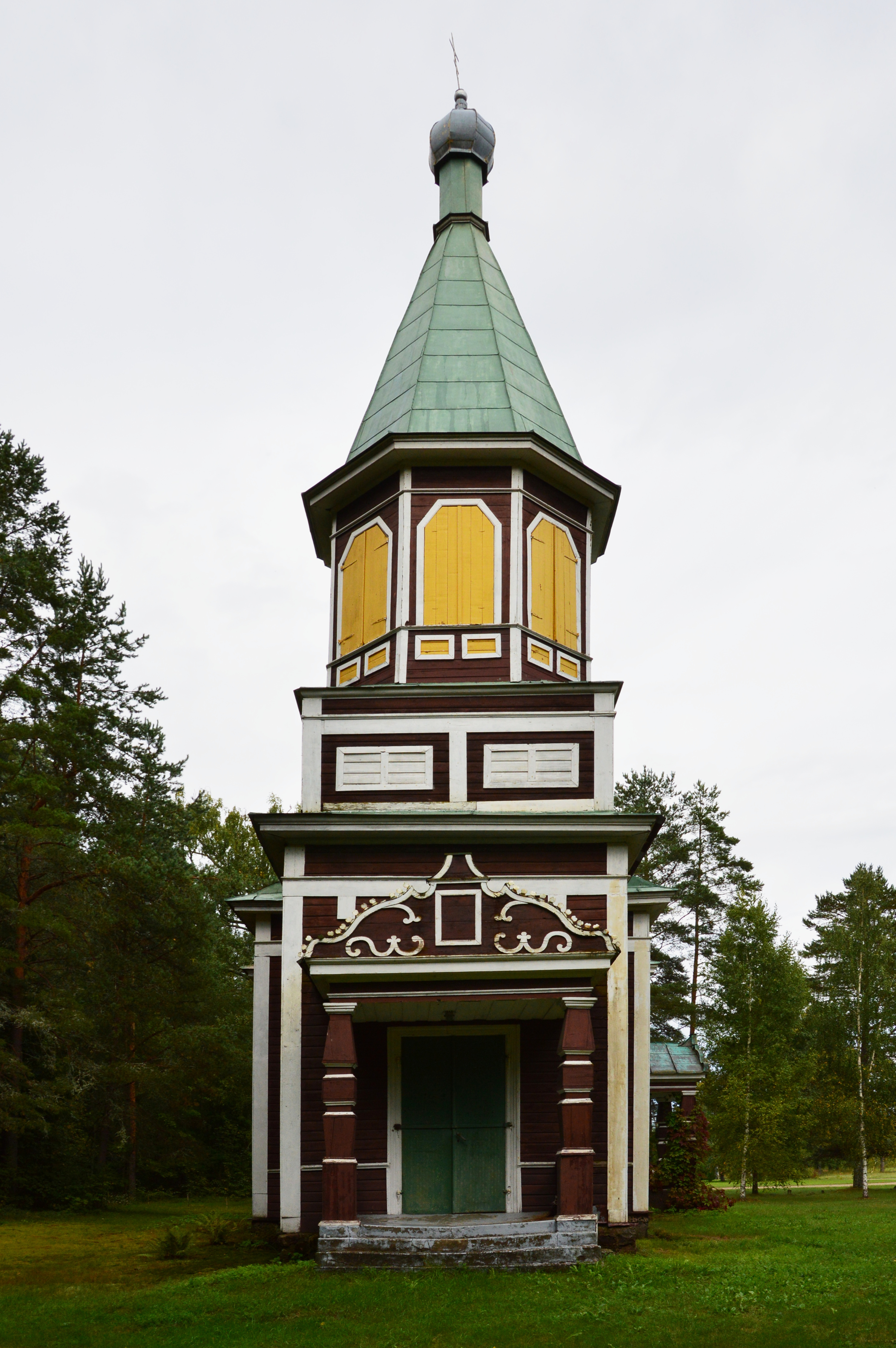
Mõniste-Ritsiku Orthodox church of St. John the Baptist

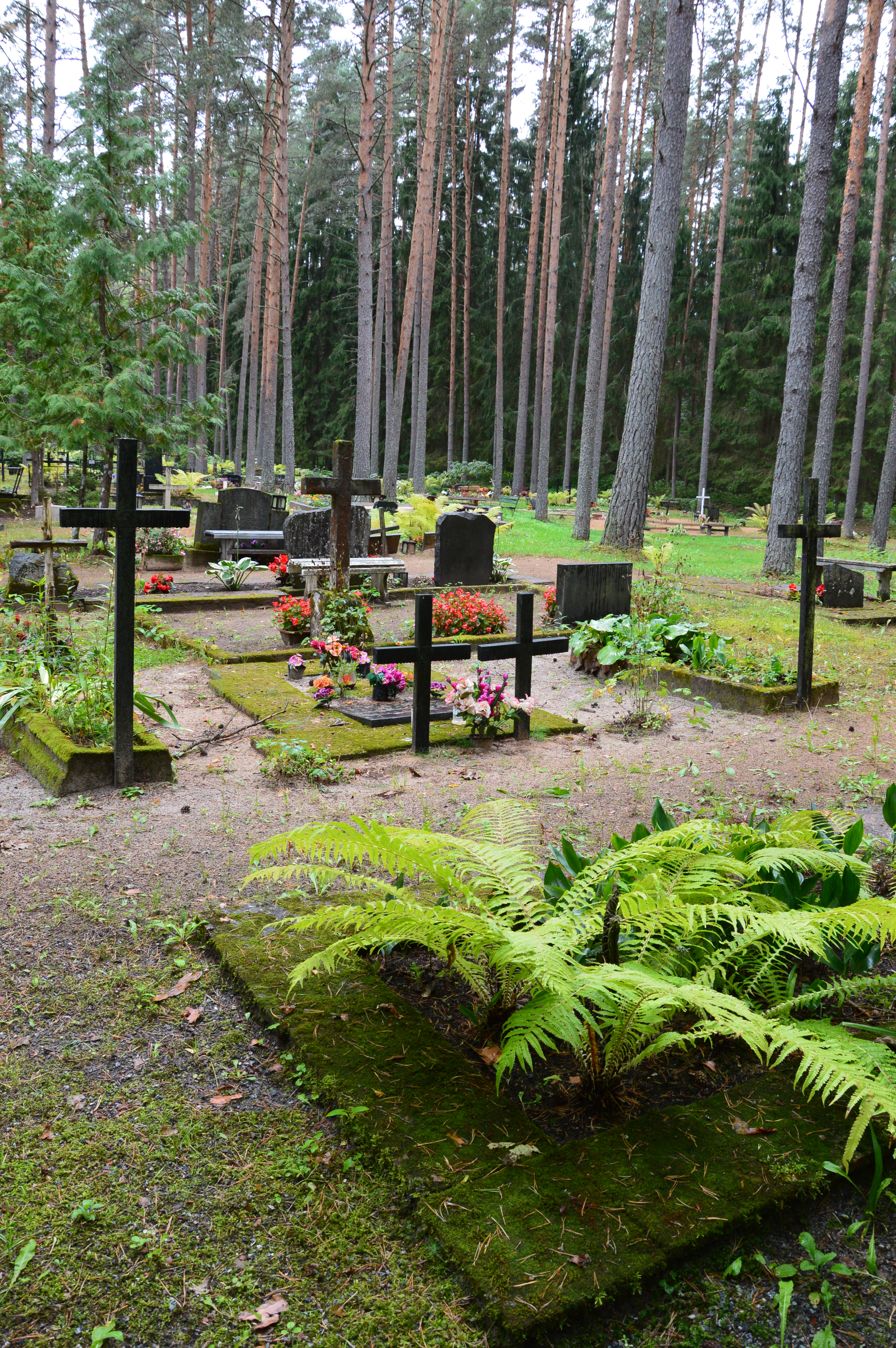
Ritsiku cemetery in Varstu

== See also ==
- Varstu Airfield
