= Viru, Võru County =

Village in Estonia

Viru
- Village
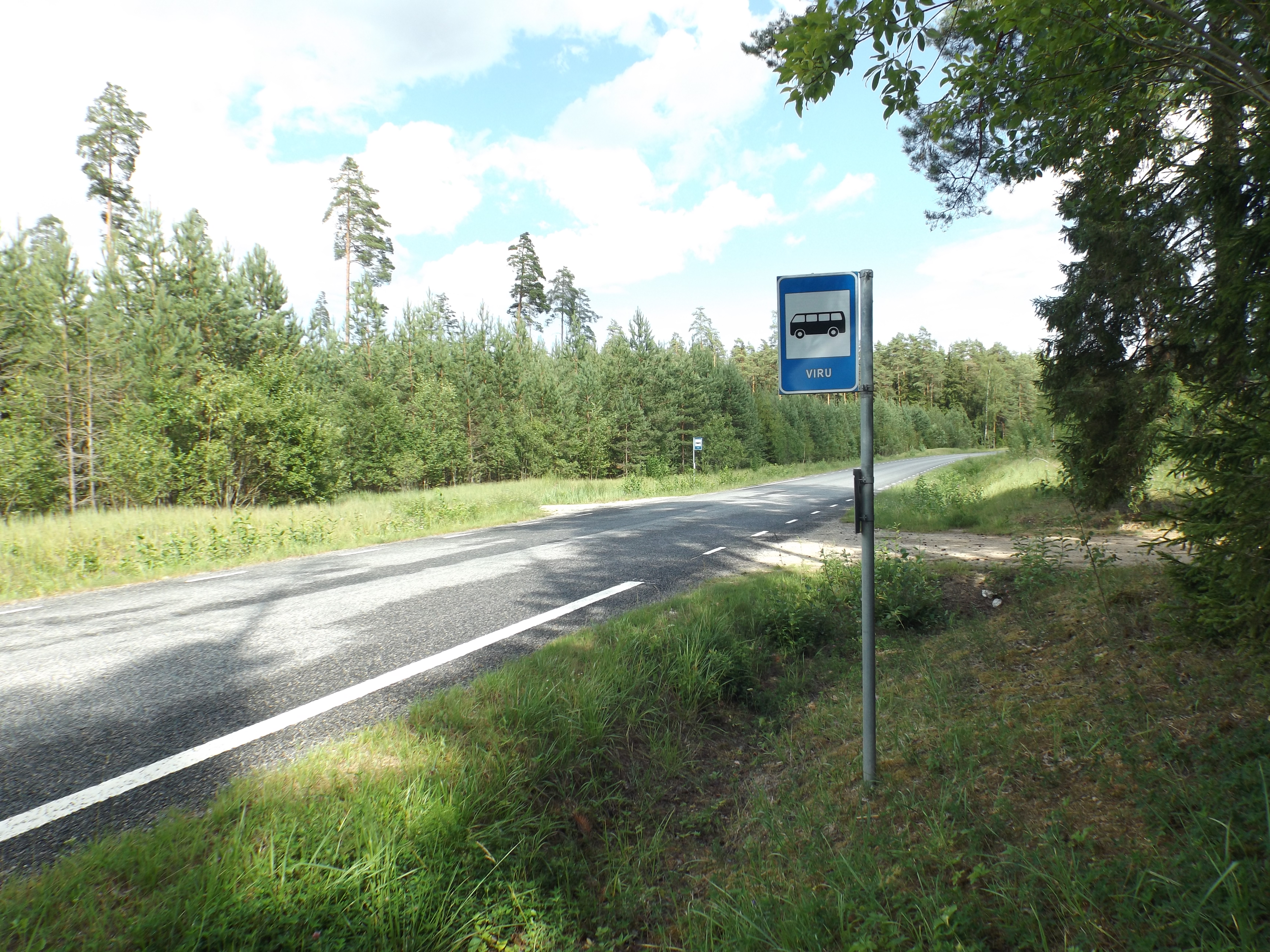
- Bus stop in Viru

- Location within Estonia
- Coordinates: 57.744444444444°N 26.759722222222°E
- Country: Estonia
- County: Võru County
- Parish: Rõuge Parish
- Time zone: UTC+2 (EET)
  - Summer (DST): UTC+3 (EEST)

Viru is a village in Rõuge Parish, Võru County in Estonia.
