= Raudsepa, Rõuge Parish =

Village in Võru County, Estonia

- Village
- Location within Estonia
- Coordinates: 57.6458°N 26.7094°E
- Country: Estonia
- County: Võru County
- Parish: Rõuge Parish
- Time zone: UTC+2 (EET)
  - Summer (DST): UTC+3 (EEST)

Raudsepa is a village in Rõuge Parish, Võru County in Estonia. It has a population of 37 (as of 7 February 2008).

Before the Estonian local government administrative reform in 2017, the village belonged to Varstu rural municipality.
