= Hüti, Võru County =

Village in Estonia

Hüti
- Village
- Location in Estonia
- Coordinates: 57°35′58″N 26°36′47″E
- Country: Estonia
- County: Võru County
- Municipality: Rõuge Parish

Population (2011 Census)
  - Total: 27

Hüti is a village in Rõuge Parish, Võru County in southeastern Estonia. Between 1991 and 2017 (until the administrative reform of Estonian municipalities) the village was located in Mõniste Parish. As of the 2011 census, the settlement's population was 27.
