= Tagakolga =

Village in Estonia

- Location within Estonia
- Coordinates: 57°34′0″N 26°45′0″E
- Country: Estonia
- County: Võru County
- Time zone: UTC+2 (EET)

Tagakolga is a settlement in Rõuge Parish, Võru County, Estonia.
