= Mõniste =

Village in Estonia

- Location within Estonia
- Coordinates: 57°36′33″N 26°36′49″E
- Country: Estonia
- County: Võru County
- Time zone: UTC+2 (EET)

Mõniste, formerly known by its German name Menzen, is a village in Rõuge Parish, Võru County in southeastern Estonia.

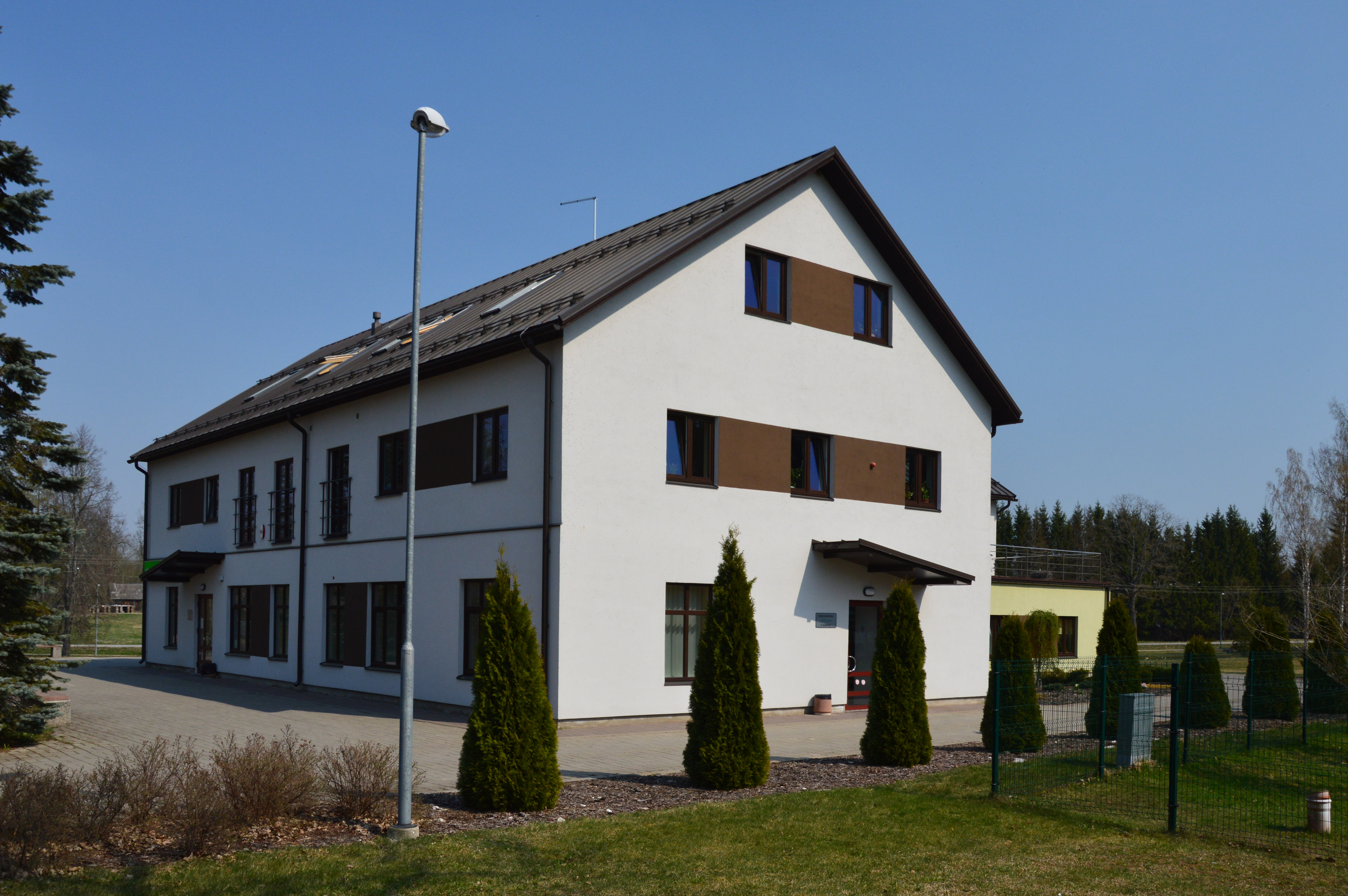

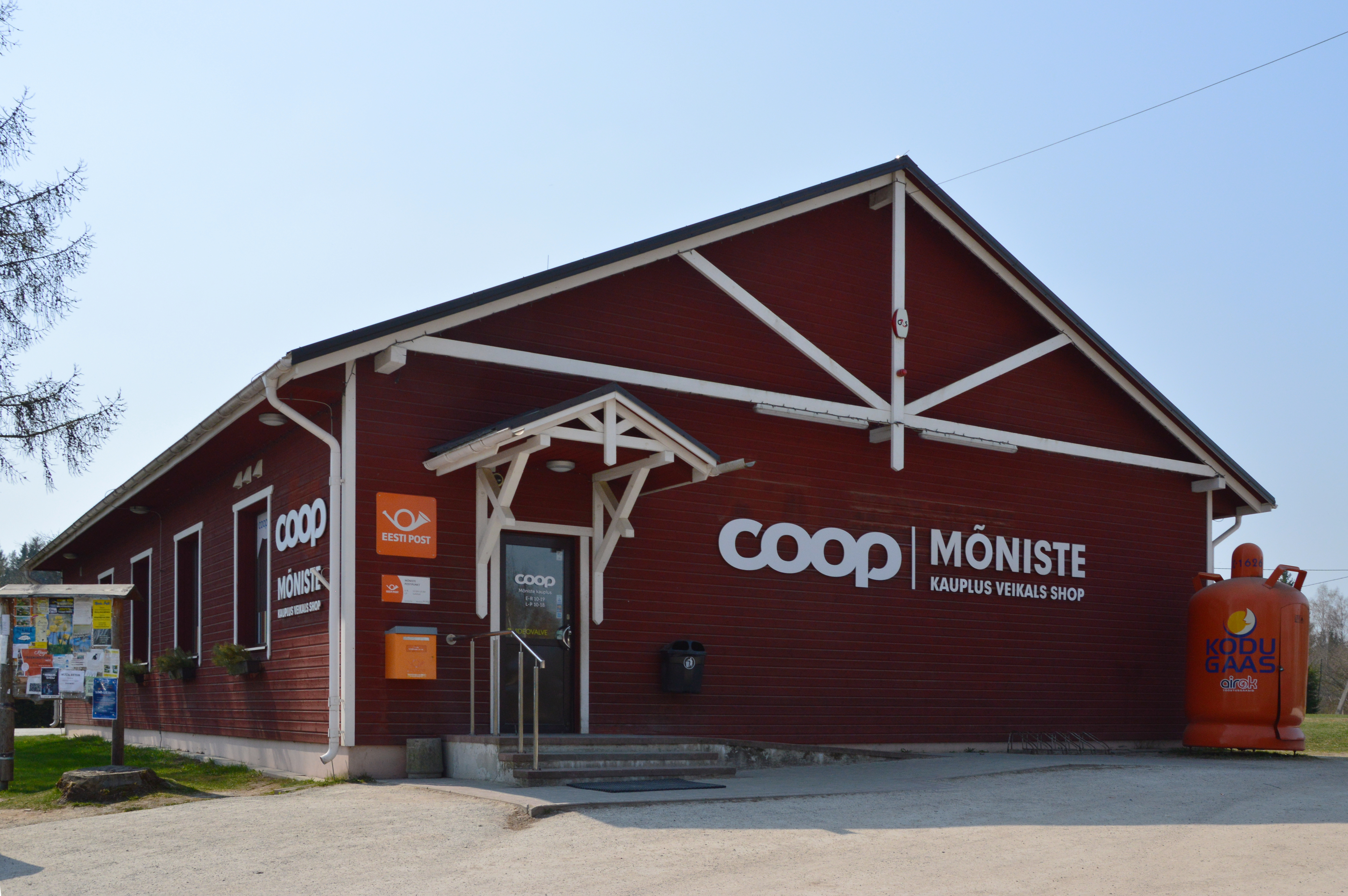

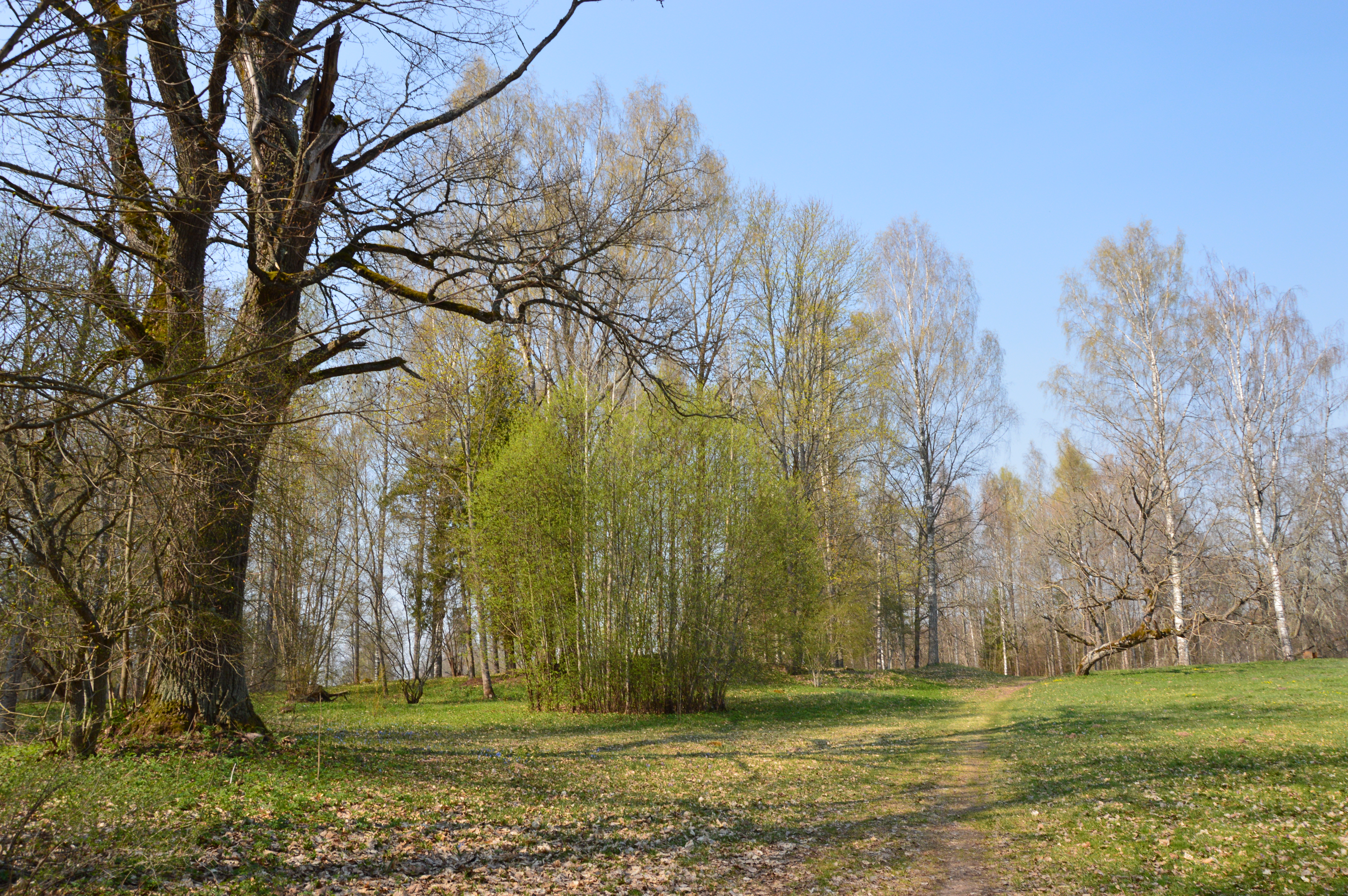

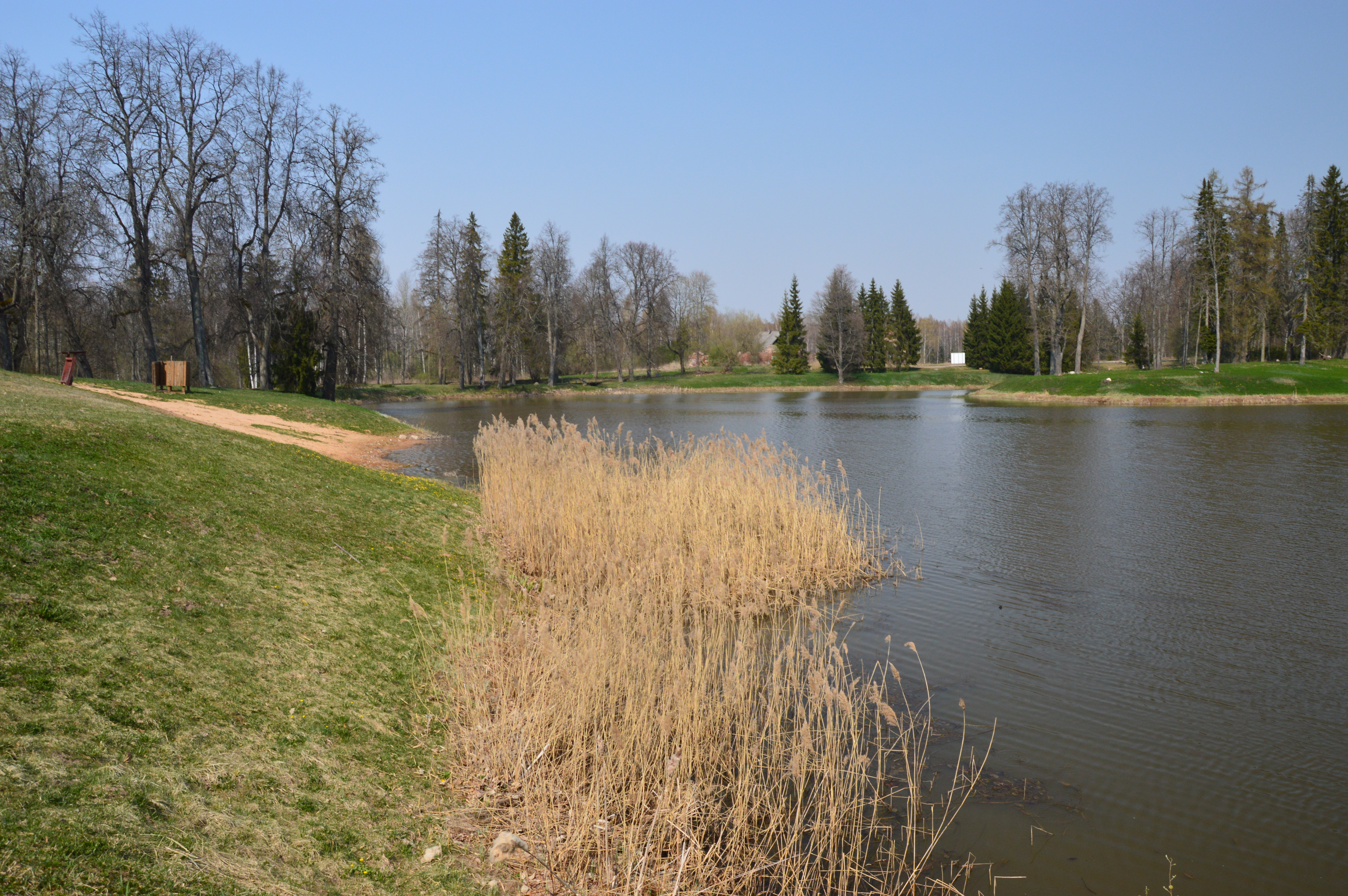
