= Paganamaa =

Village in Estonia

- Village
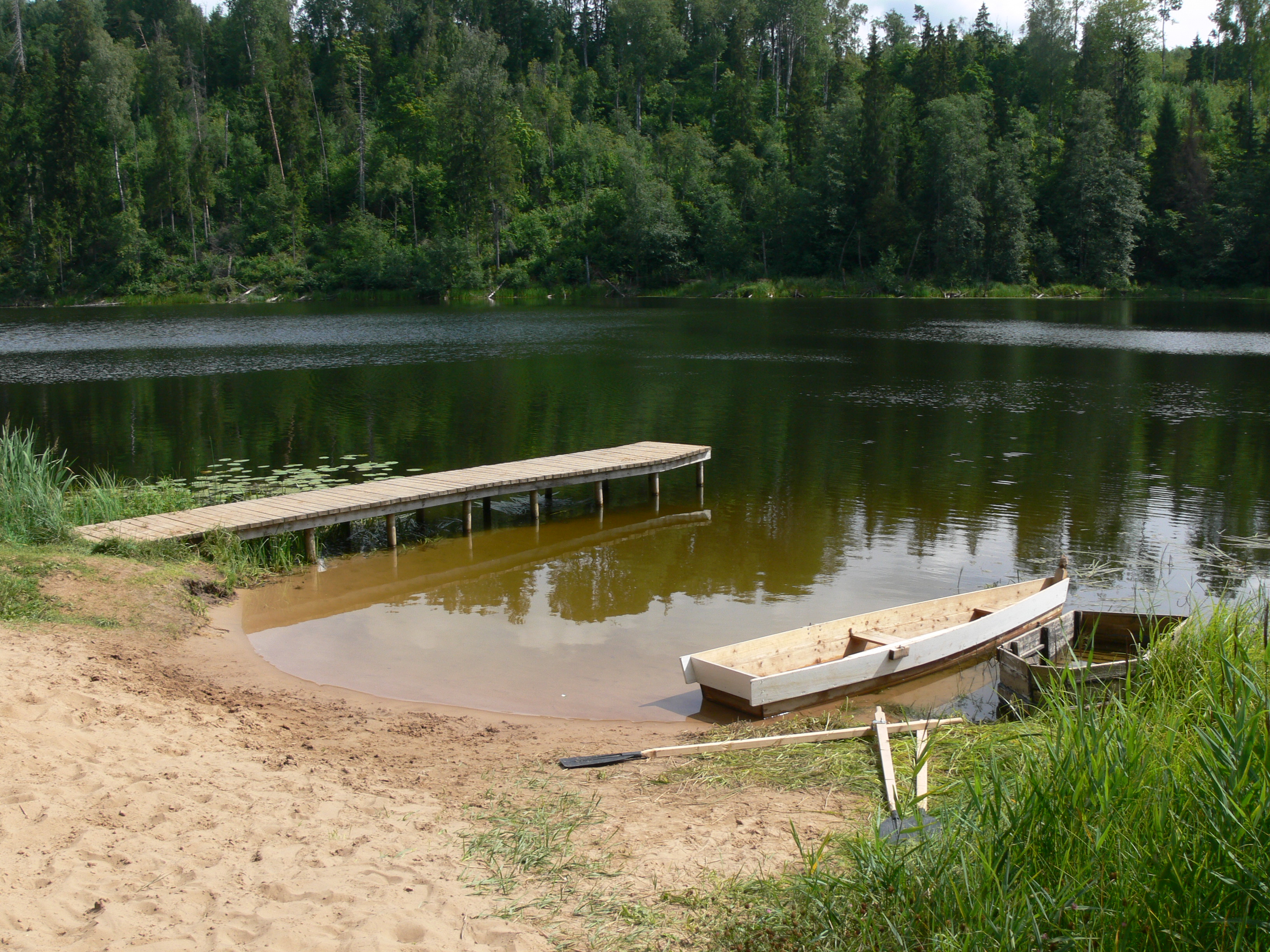
- Liivajärv, a lake in Paganamaa

- Location in Estonia
- Coordinates: 57°36′34″N 26°50′02″E
- Country: Estonia
- County: Võru County
- Municipality: Rõuge Parish
- Time zone: UTC+2 (EET)

Paganamaa is a settlement in Rõuge Parish, Võru County in southeastern Estonia.

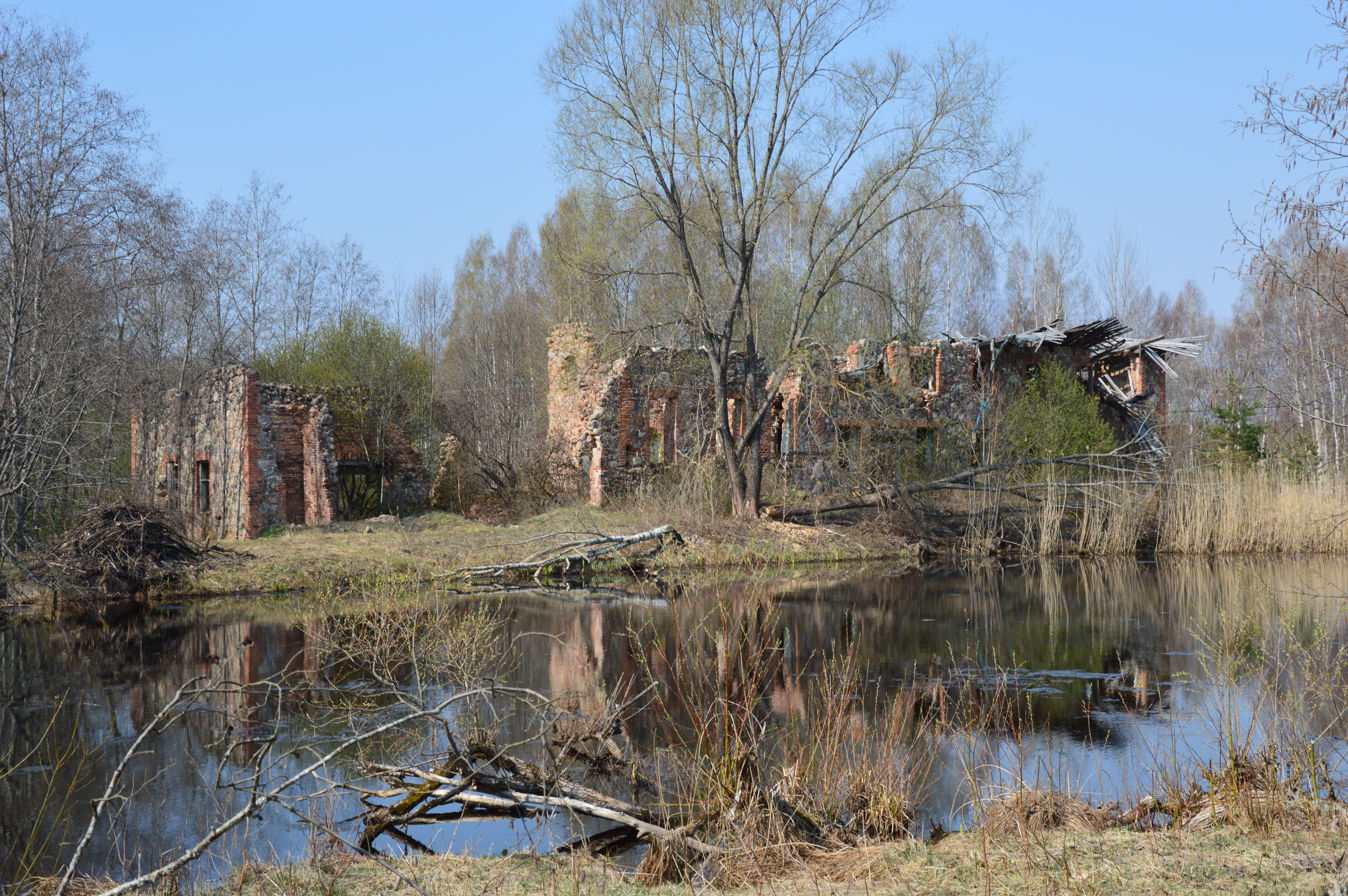
The ruins of the Krabi Mill and distillery in Paganamaa
