= Kallaste, Rõuge Parish =

Village in Estonia

- Village
- Location within Estonia
- Coordinates: 57.612777777778°N 26.583888888889°E
- Country: Estonia
- County: Võru County
- Parish: Rõuge Parish
- Time zone: UTC+2 (EET)
  - Summer (DST): UTC+3 (EEST)

Kallaste is a village in Rõuge Parish, Võru County in Estonia.
