= Hüti, Hiiu County =

Village in Estonia

Hüti
- Village
- Location in Estonia
- Coordinates: 58°54′27″N 22°29′52″E
- Country: Estonia
- County: Hiiu County
- Municipality: Hiiumaa Parish

Population (2011 Census)
  - Total: 0

Hüti is a village in Hiiumaa Parish, Hiiu County, Estonia, on the island of Hiiumaa. As of the 2011 census, the settlement's population was 0.

In 1628, the first glass factory in Estonia was established in Hüti. It was owned by the Swedish military commander and a great Hiiumaa's landowner Jacob De la Gardie. But it closed off in 1664.

The village is first mentioned in 1798 (Hütti). Historically, the village was part of Kõrgessaare Manor (German: Hohenholm), and Lauka Manor (German: Lauk). Before 2013, it was located in Kõrgessaare Parish.

== Gallery ==
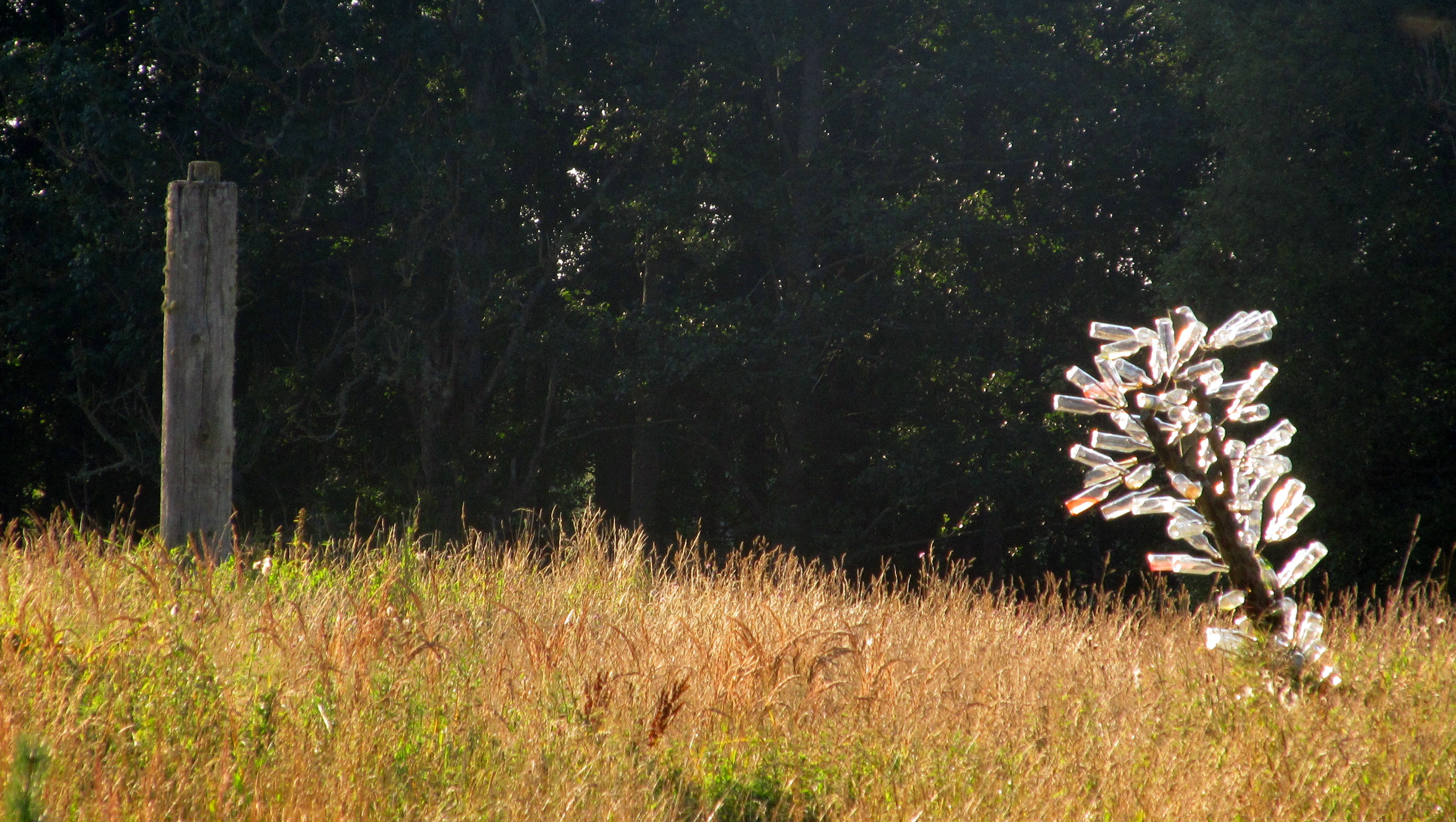
The site of the former glass factory

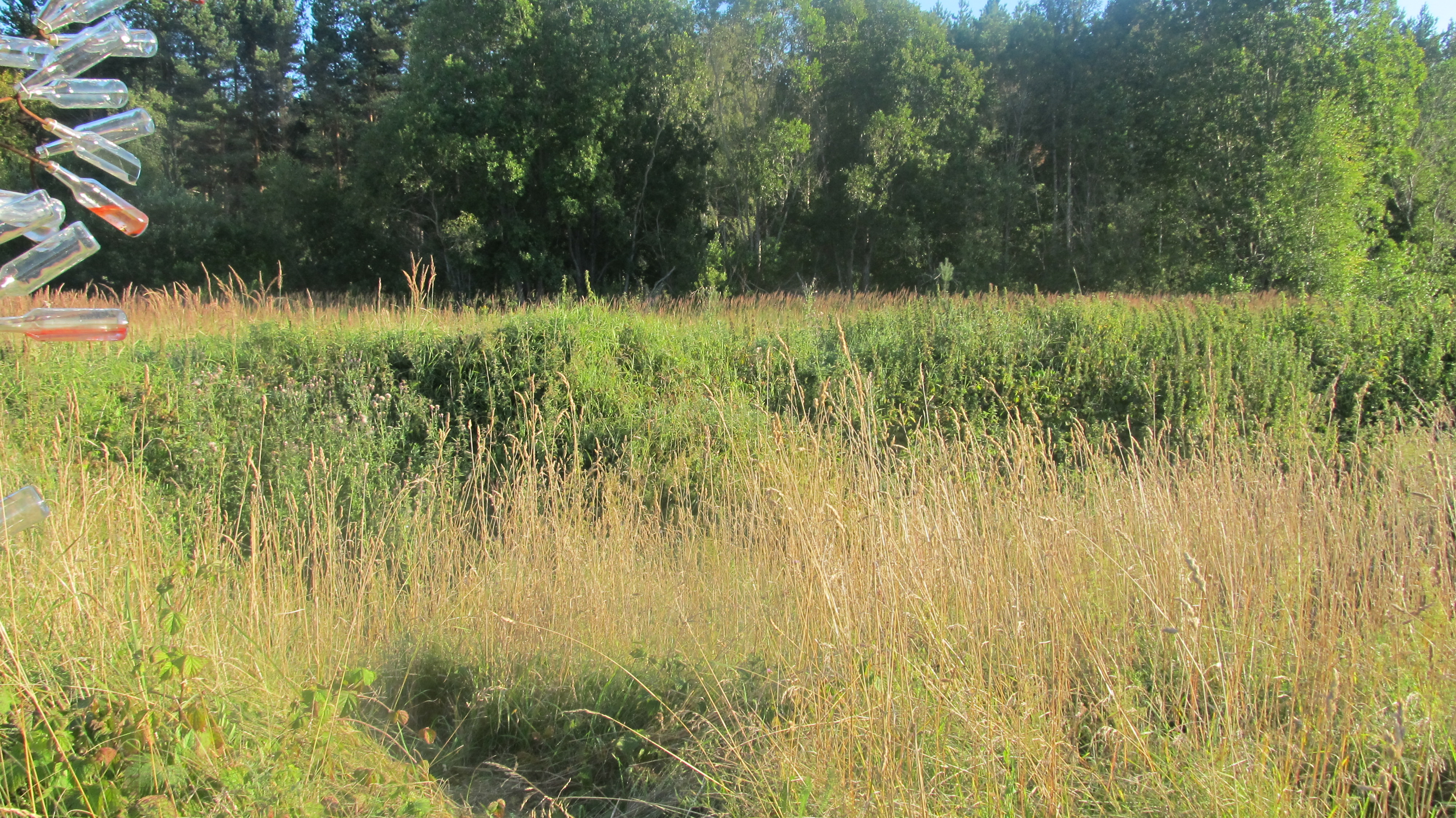
