= Pähni =

Village in Estonia

Pahni
- Location within Estonia
- Coordinates: 57°37′45″N 26°46′57″E
- Country: Estonia
- County: Võru County
- Time zone: UTC+2 (EET)

Pahni is a settlement in Rõuge Parish, Võru County in southeastern Estonia.
