= Extreme points of Estonia =

This is a list of the extreme points on land of Estonia: the points that are farther north, south, east or west than any other location.

== Latitude and longitude ==
- North: Vaindloo island, Vainupea village, Haljala Parish, Lääne-Viru County (59°49′17″N 26°21′31″E)
  - Mainland: Cape Purekkari, Pärispea village, Kuusalu Parish, Harju County(59°40′31″N 25°41′49″E)
  - Urban settlement: Loksa Town, Harju County (59°35′32″N 25°42′23″E)
- East: Narva Town, Ida-Viru County (59°22′13″N 28°12′36″E)
- South: Karisöödi village, Rõuge Parish, Võru County (57°30′33″N 26°37′00″E)
  - Urban settlement: Misso small borough, Rõuge Parish, Võru County (57°35′38″N 27°12′34″E)
- West: Nootamaa Island, Atla village, Lääne-Saare Parish, Saare County (58°19′20″N 21°45′51″E)
  - Inhabited island: Vilsandi island, Vilsandi village, Saaremaa Parish, Saare County (58°23′07″N 21°38′31″E)
  - Urban settlement: Kihelkonna small borough, Saaremaa Parish, Saare County (58°21′52″N 22°01′15″E)
  - Mainland: Cape Ramsi, Einbi/Enby village, Lääne-Nigula Parish, Lääne County (59°01′31″N 23°24′15″E)
    - Urban settlement: Haapsalu Town, Haapsalu Town (urban municipality), Lääne County (58°55′56″N 23°29′09″E)

== Altitude ==
- Highest point: Suur Munamägi, located in Haanja village, Haanja Parish, Võru County, 318 metres (1,043 ft) (57°42′52″N 27°3′33″E)
- Lowest point: Baltic Sea, 0 m

== See also ==
- Extreme points of Europe
- Extreme points of Earth
- Geography of Estonia
