= Vaindloo =

Island in Estonia

Vaindloo Stenskär (Swedish)
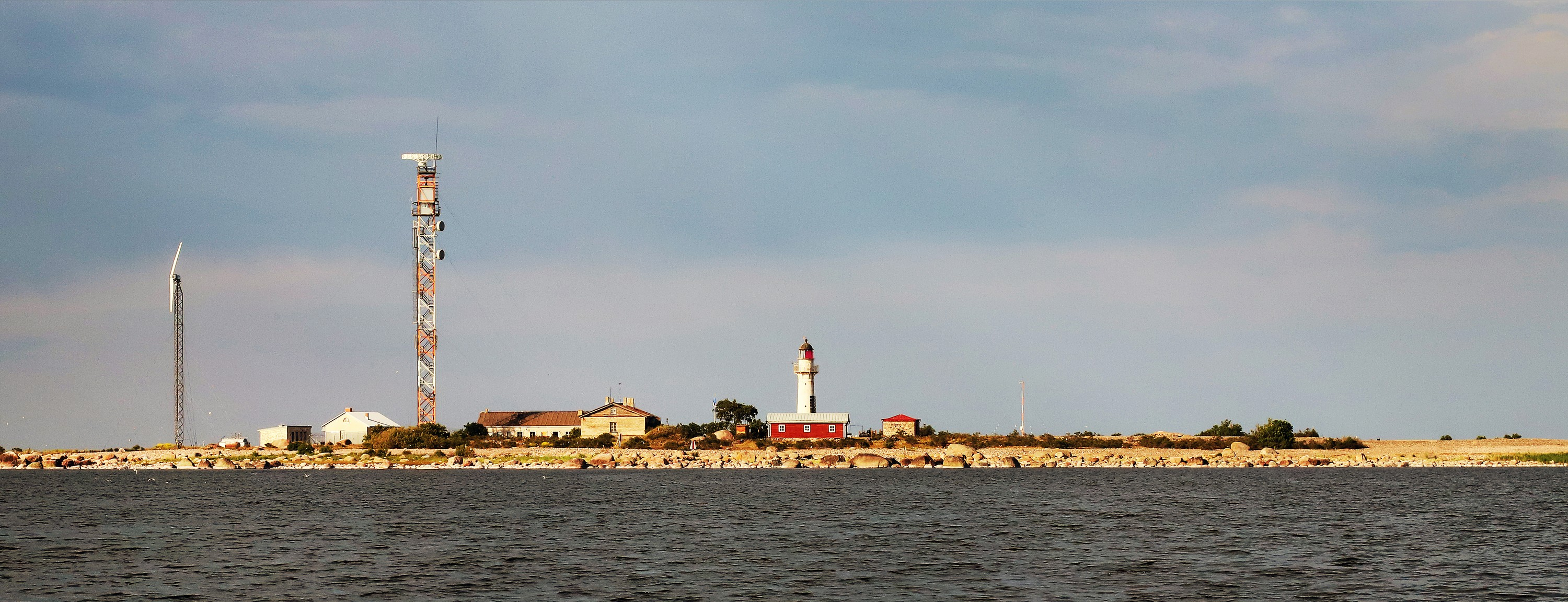
- View of Vaindloo from the sea

- Location in the Baltic Sea region Location in Estonia Location in Europe
- Coordinates: 59.8177°N 26.36005°E
- Country: Estonia
- County: Lääne-Viru County
- Village: Vainupea

Area
  - Total: 0.062 km^{2} (0.024 sq mi)

Population
  - Total: no permanent population

Vaindloo (alternatively Vaindloo saar; Swedish: Stenskär) is an Estonian uninhabited island in the Gulf of Finland in the Baltic Sea.

== Description ==
Vaindloo belongs to Estonia; it is the northernmost land point of the country. It has an area of 6.2 hectares (15 acres) and marks the northernmost point of the nation of Estonia, situated 26 kilometers (14 nmi) north of the Estonian mainland and 18 kilometers (10 nmi) north of the Uhtju islands. It is 24 kilometers (13 nmi) south-west of the Russian island of Rodsher and about 54 kilometers (29 nmi) from the mainland of Finland.

The island has no permanent inhabitants; from 1994 to 2014 two Estonian Border Guards were stationed on the island, but in 2014 it was decided automation made this unnecessary.

The island is administratively part of the village of Vainupea in Haljala Parish, Lääne-Viru County. The island is depicted on the Estonian two-euro coin. The Euro Coin Collector website notes:

"On the 2 Euro coin two small islands, Vaindloo and Nootamaa, are depicted. These, the most Northerly point and most Westerly point of Estonia, are not depicted on the other coins."

=== Infrastructure ===
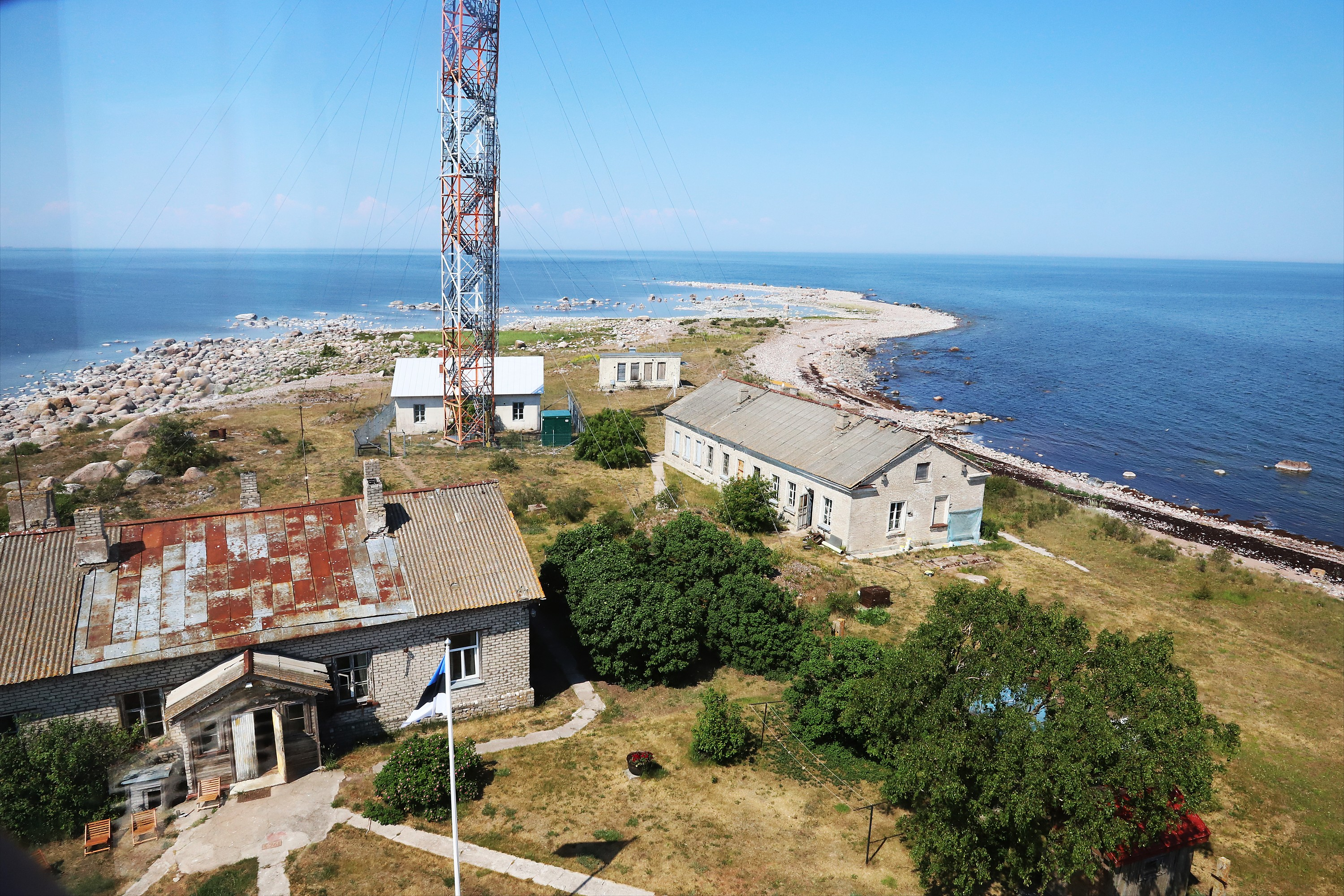
Buildings on Vaindloo in 2023 from the lighthouse

Vaindloo is notable for its lighthouse. It was built in 1871 and is managed by the Estonian Maritime Administration. It replaced a previous timber lighthouse erected in 1718. In addition to the lighthouse, there is an Estonian Border Guard station with a 50-meter-high (160 ft) observation tower and a radar installation. Access is by helicopter.

== Environment ==
Vaindloo is an important breeding sanctuary for such birds as the common tern, Arctic tern, Tengmalm's owl, great tit, purple sandpiper, shore lark, great grey shrike, yellowhammer and others.

== Recent history ==
When part of the Soviet Union, a straight baseline segment from Vaindloo to Rodsher, now Russian, formed part of a series of baselines used to calculate the extent of Soviet Union territorial waters. The now incomplete system of straight baselines creates some uncertainty to the maritime boundary in the area of the island and the position of the potential Estonia-Finland-Russia equidistance maritime tripoint. As of May 2021, a 2014 draft treaty on the border had not been ratified by either party.

On 20 September 2025, Estonia reported that three Russian MiG-31 fighter jets flew into Estonian airspace, with initial media reports stating they flew around Vaindloo island for around 12 minutes, and that they were forced to turn back after Italian F-35's stationed at Ämari Air Base under NATO's Baltic Air Policing mission intercepted them. However subsequently the Estonian Defence Forces published a chart of the flight showing the jets entering Estonian airspace west of the island near Loksa and flew further west in a straight line down the Gulf of Finland parallel to the Estonia border en-route to Kaliningrad. Estonian MP and former chief of intelligence Eerik-Niiles Kross noted that aircraft control zones do not align with the state boundary near Vaindloo. The event caused Estonia to activate Article 4 of the NATO treaty. Russia has denied any wrong-doing and has said that the fighter jets were flying in neutral airspace.

== Gallery ==
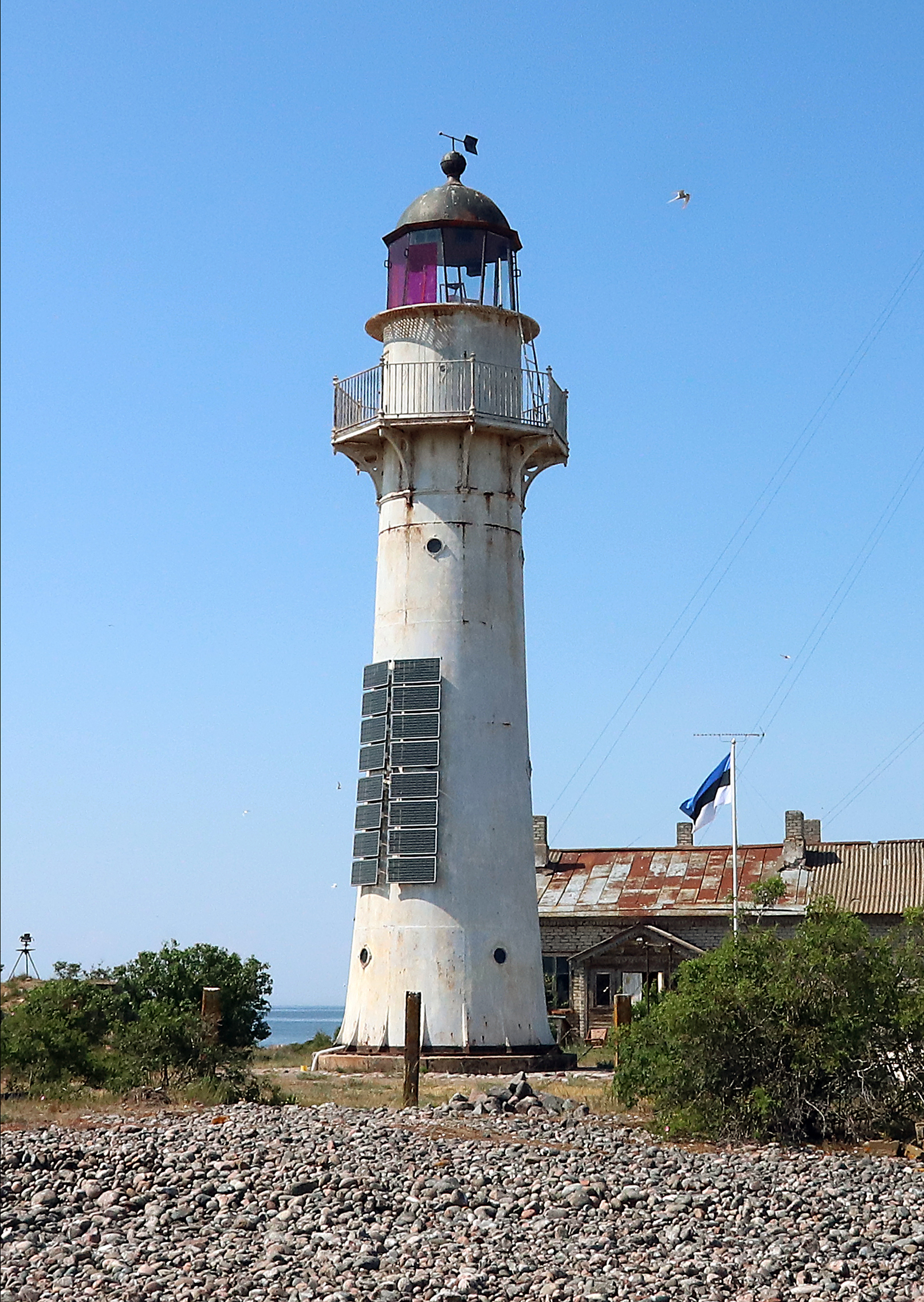

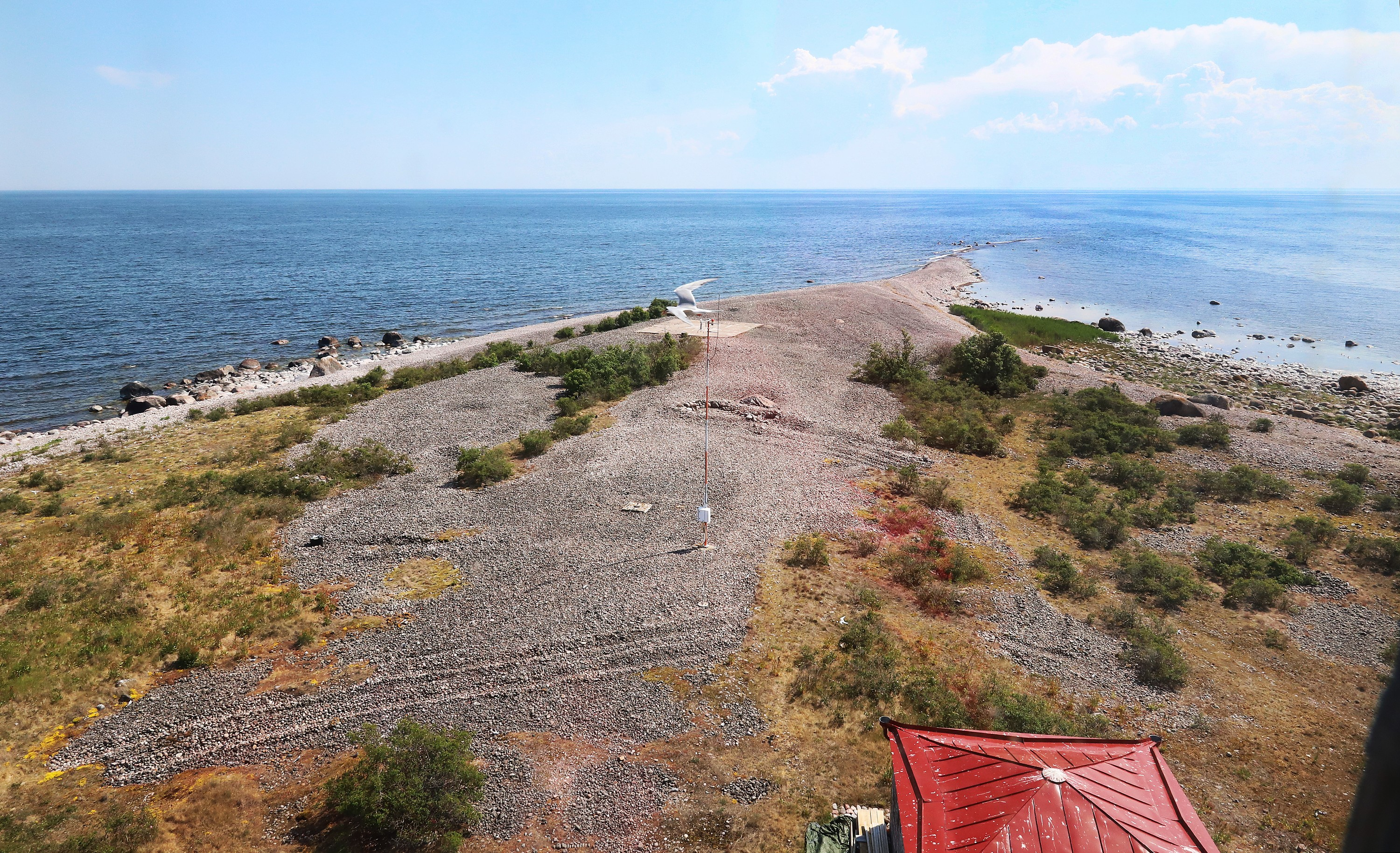

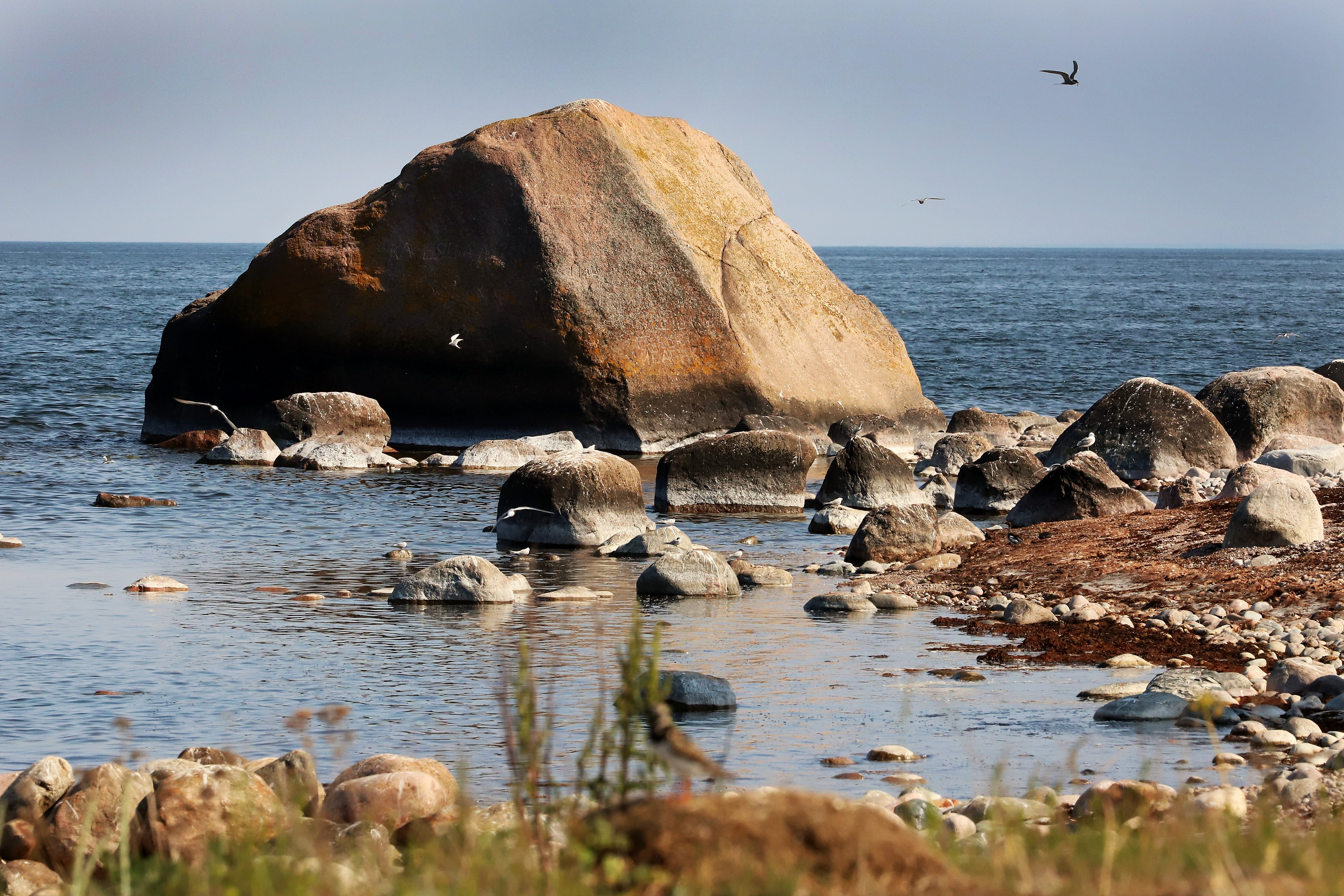

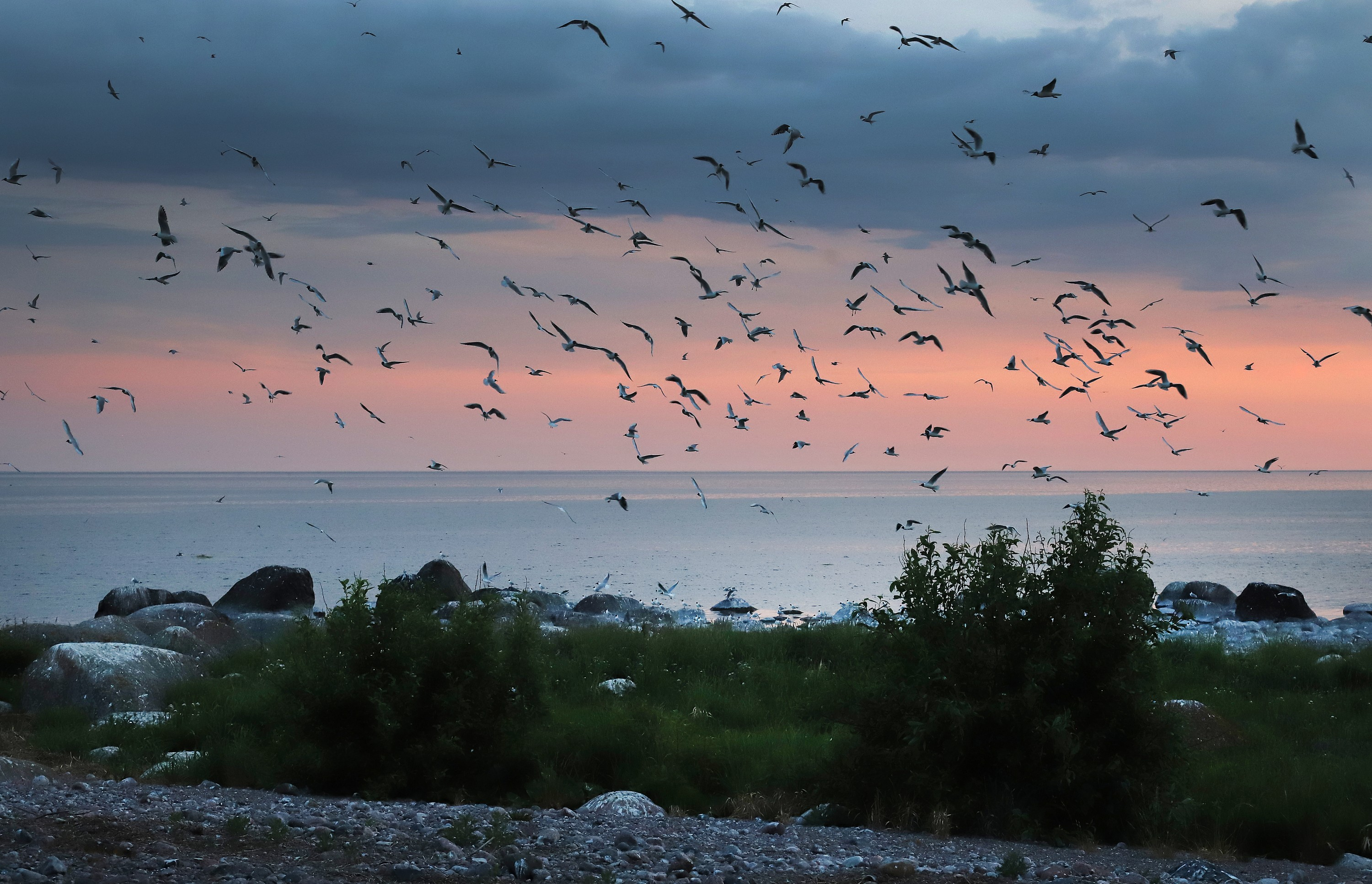

== See also ==
- List of islands of Estonia
- Narva Bay
