= Vainupea =

Village in northern Estonia

- Village
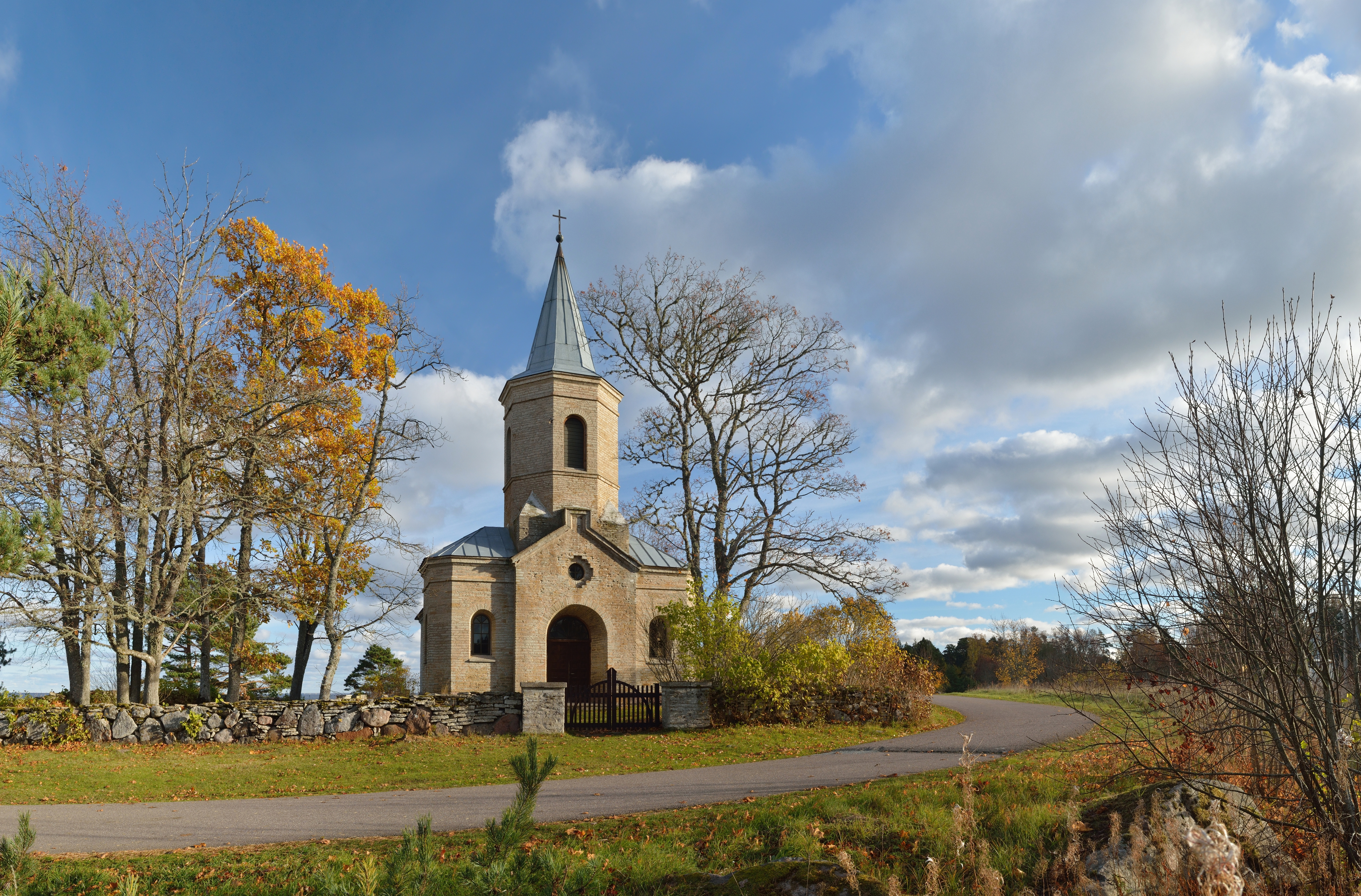
- Vainupea Chapel

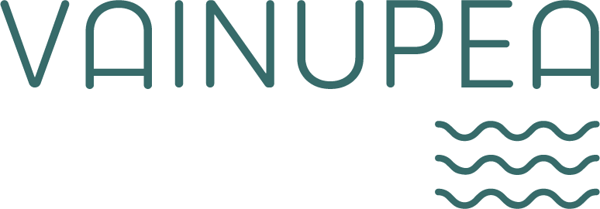
- Logo

- Location within Estonia
- Coordinates: 59°35′N 26°16′E
- Country: Estonia
- County: Lääne-Viru County
- Parish: Haljala Parish
- Established: 1583

Area
  - Total: 8.1 km^{2} (3.1 sq mi)

Population (2024)
  - Total: 48
- Time zone: UTC+2 (EET)
  - Summer (DST): UTC+3 (EEST)

Vainupea is a coastal village in northern Estonia. Administratively, it is part of Haljala Parish, a municipality of Lääne-Viru County. The administrative territory of the village also includes the island of Vaindloo, the northernmost point of Estonia located far out in the sea.

From the 19th century until the start of World War II, Vainupea was a popular summer destination for Baltic Germans on holiday.

As of 2024, there were 48 people living in the village.

== Etymology ==
Vainupea was first mentioned in writing as Wainopä in 1583, in reference to both the village and its chapel. The village's name became Wainopæ in 1796, Wainopae in 1871, Wainope (Вайнопе) in 1900, Wainopäh in 1913, Vainupää in 1932, and finally Vainupea in 1991. Vainupea is a combination of the words vainu, meaning "between two villages" or "grassland border", and pea, meaning "headland".

== History ==
The village recognises 1583, the year the name of the village was first mentioned in writing as Wainopä, as its founding year.

Local historians believe that villagers from Vainupea likely participated in the looting of a Persian ship that had run aground on the rocks of northern Uhtju Island after a severe storm in November 1696.

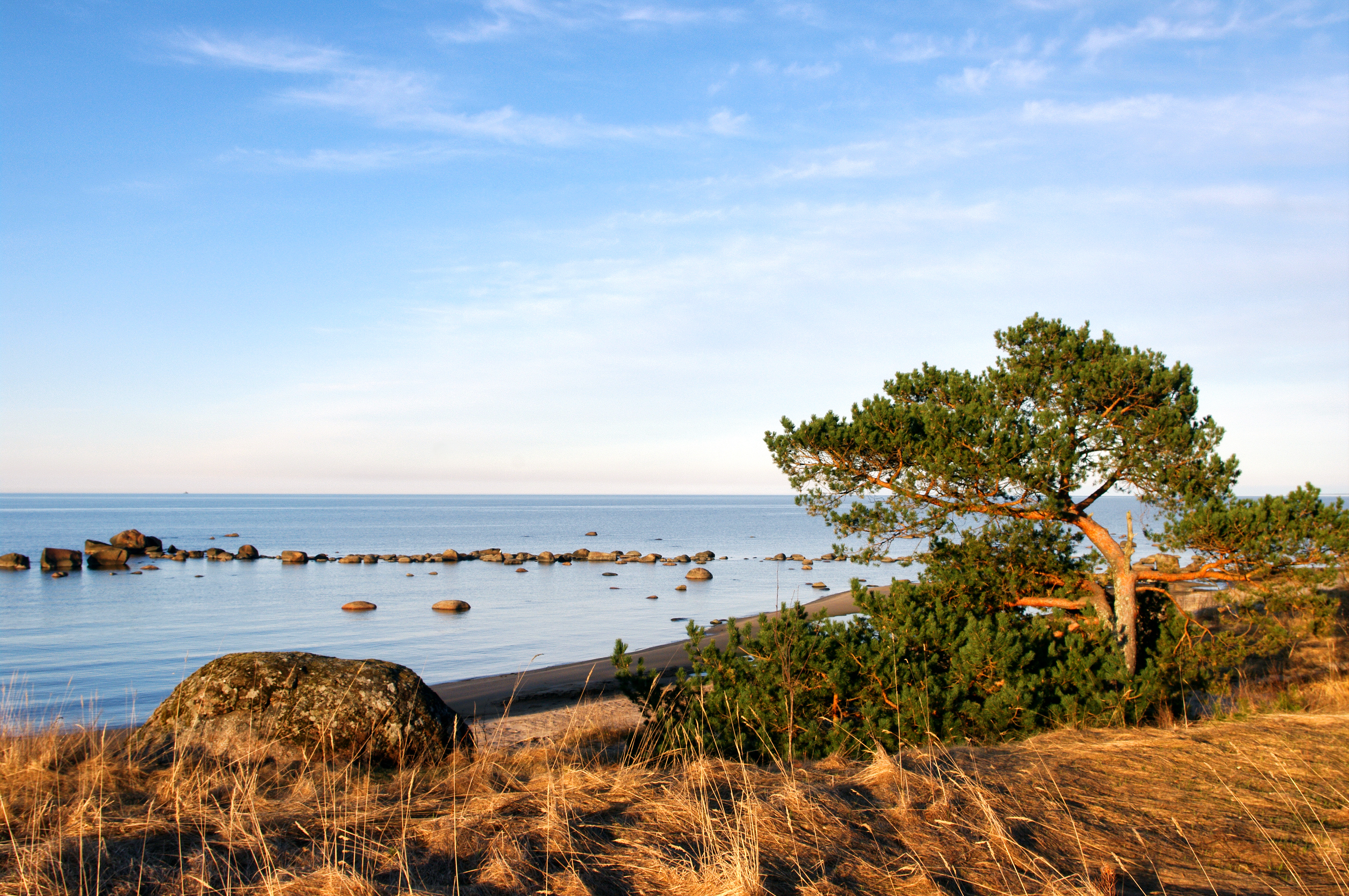
Beach in Vainupea

The landlords of Vainupea began promoting the village as a summer holiday destination in the 19th century. A large summer resort was built along with dozens of summer houses. The village attracted wealthy businessmen from Tallinn and Tartu, particularly Baltic Germans. Visitors to Vainupea by the 1930s were almost exclusively Baltic Germans. This trend ended with the outbreak of World War II in 1939.

== Geography ==
Vainupea is located on the northern coast of Estonia and covers an area of 8.1 square kilometres (3.1 sq mi). It is part of Haljala Parish, a municipality of Lääne-Viru County, and is also within the boundaries of Lahemaa National Park. The administrative boundaries of Vainupea include the island of Vaindloo, the northernmost point of Estonia, but the village is located entirely on the mainland and the island has no permanent population.

== Demographics ==
As of 1 January 2024, the village had a population of 48 people (32 men and 16 women). The population of the village and nearby communities was estimated to be 250 people.

== Gallery ==
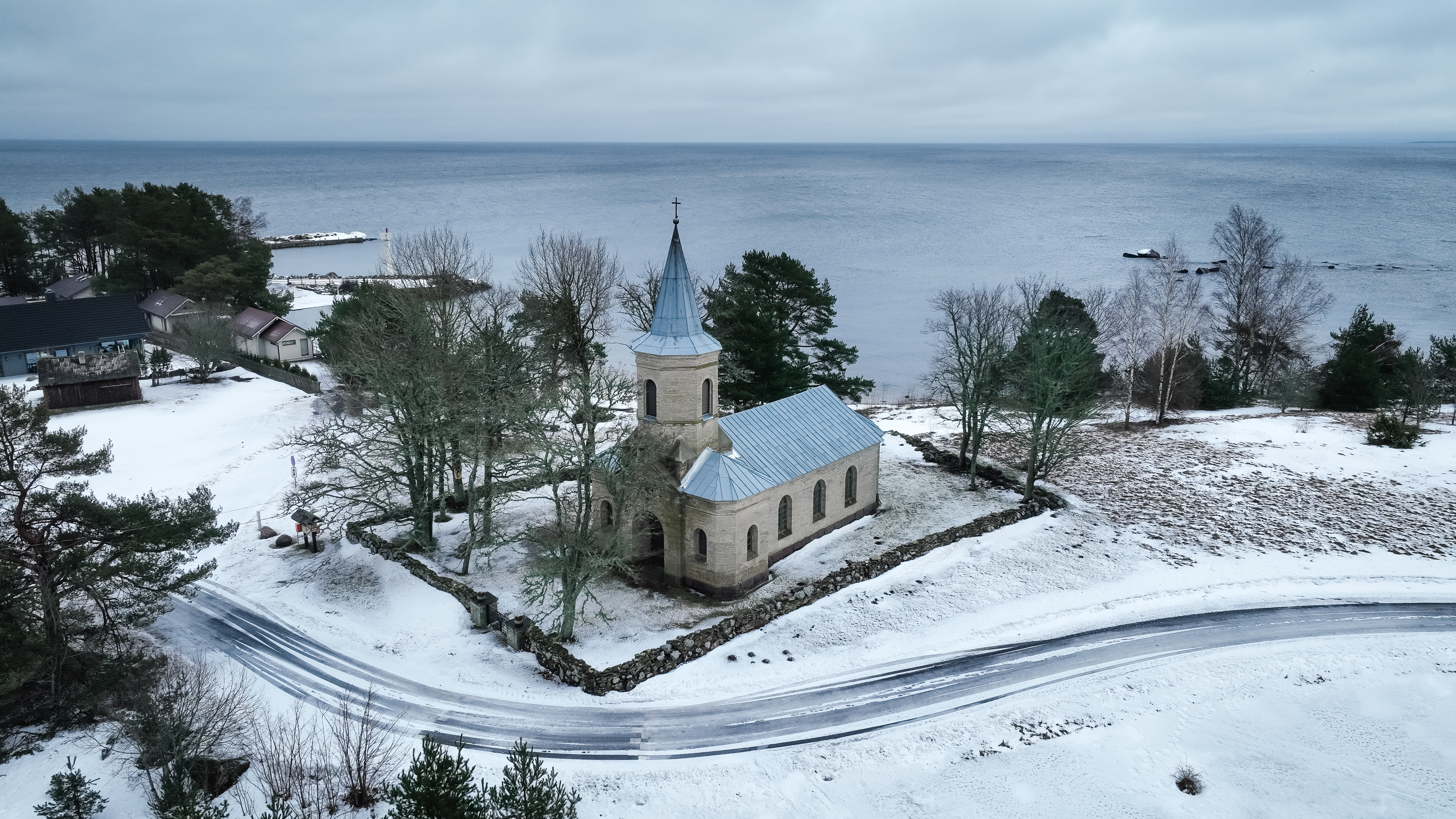
Overhead view of the Vainupea Chapel in wintertime

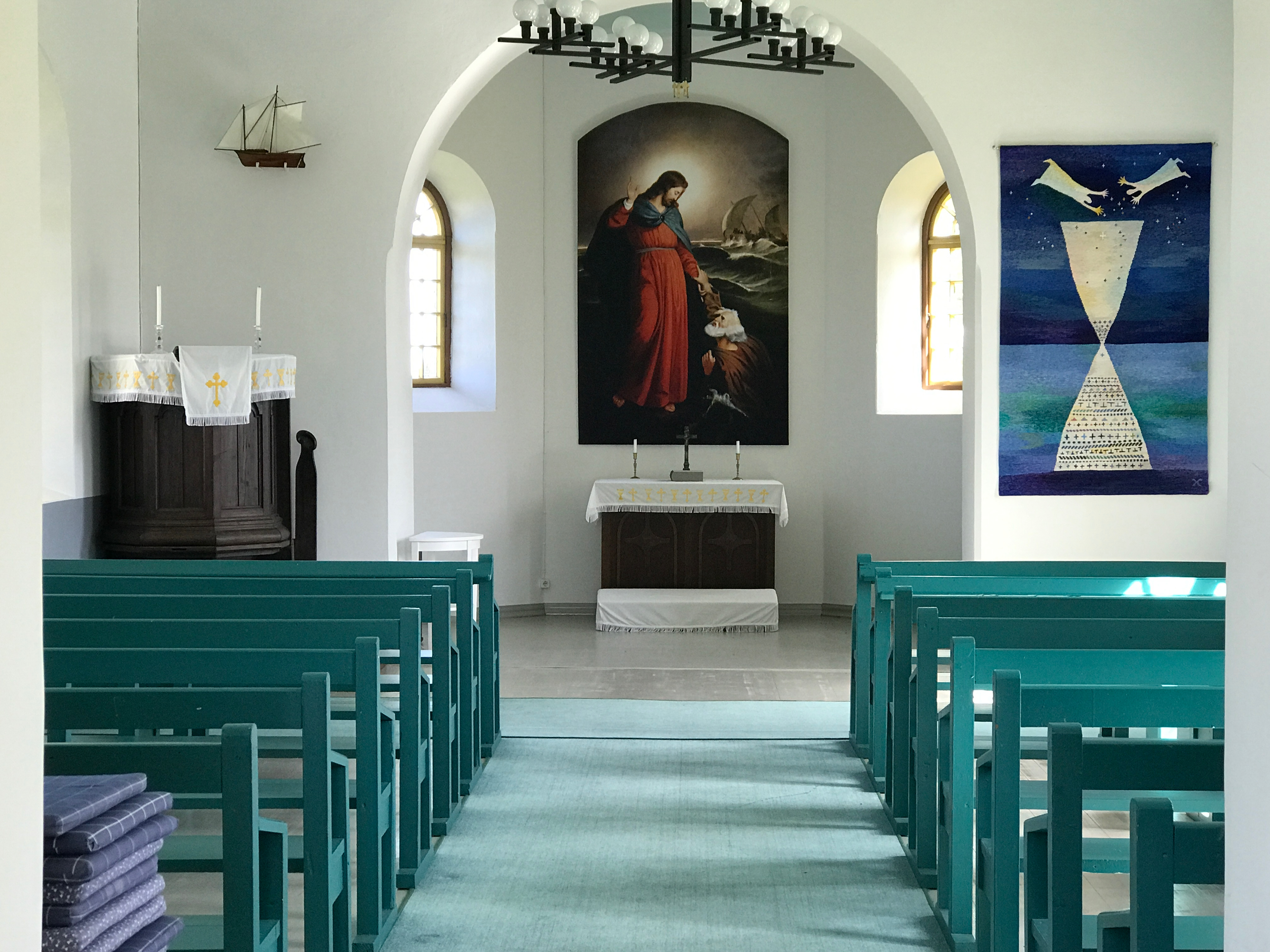
Interior of the chapel

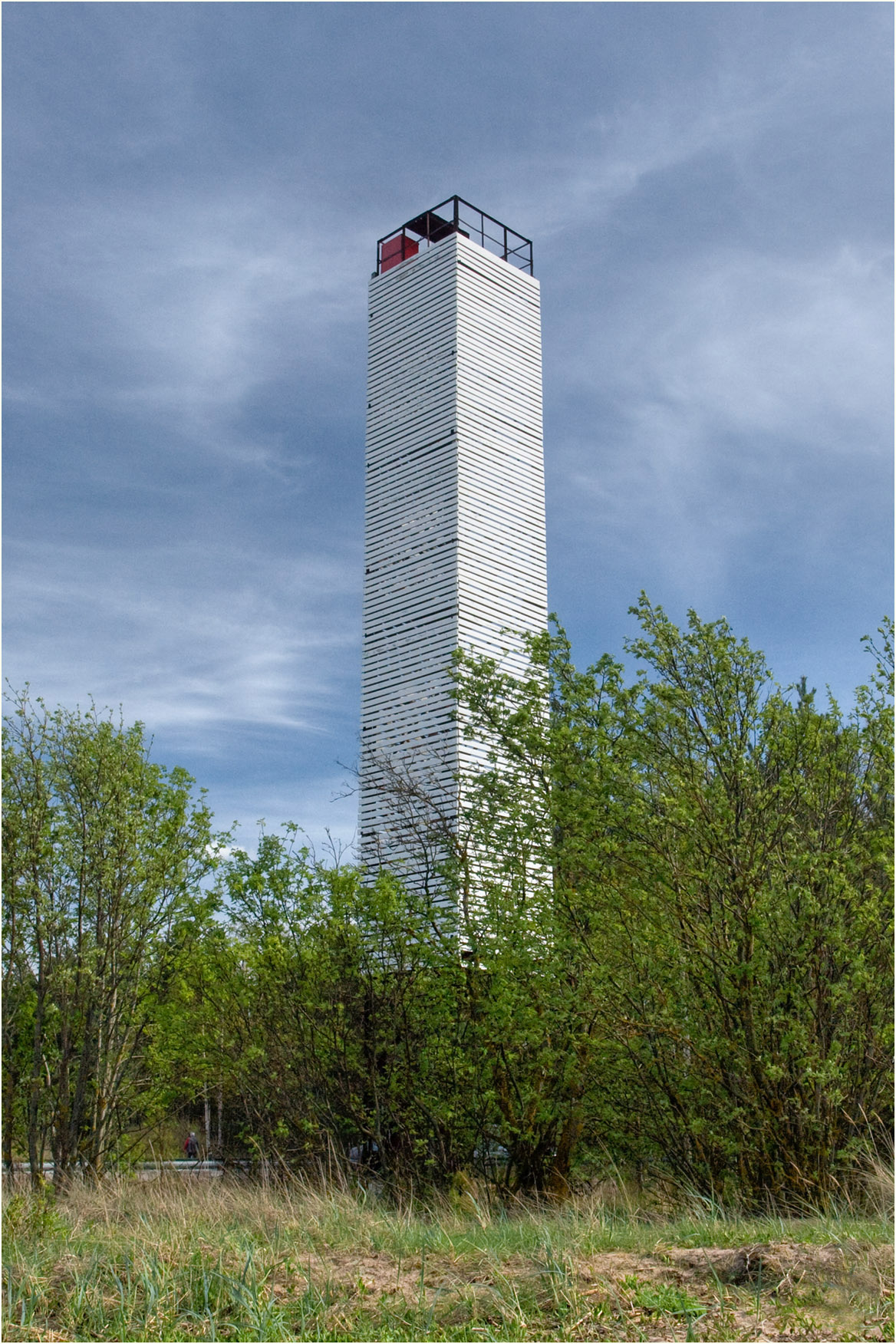
Lighthouse near Vainupea

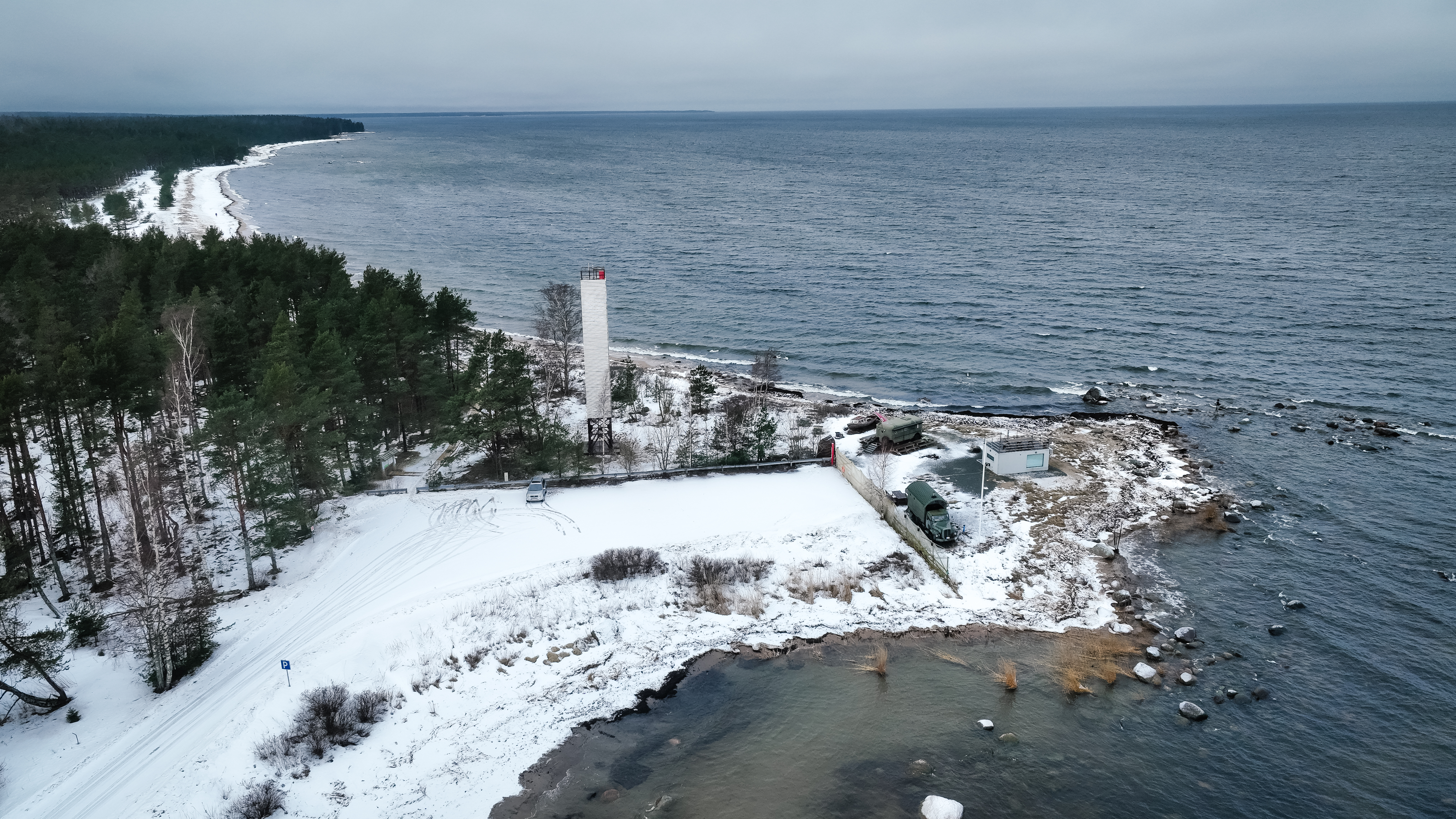
Overhead view of the lighthouse
