= Turbuneeme =

Village in Estonia

Coordinates: 59°37′N 25°47′E

- Village
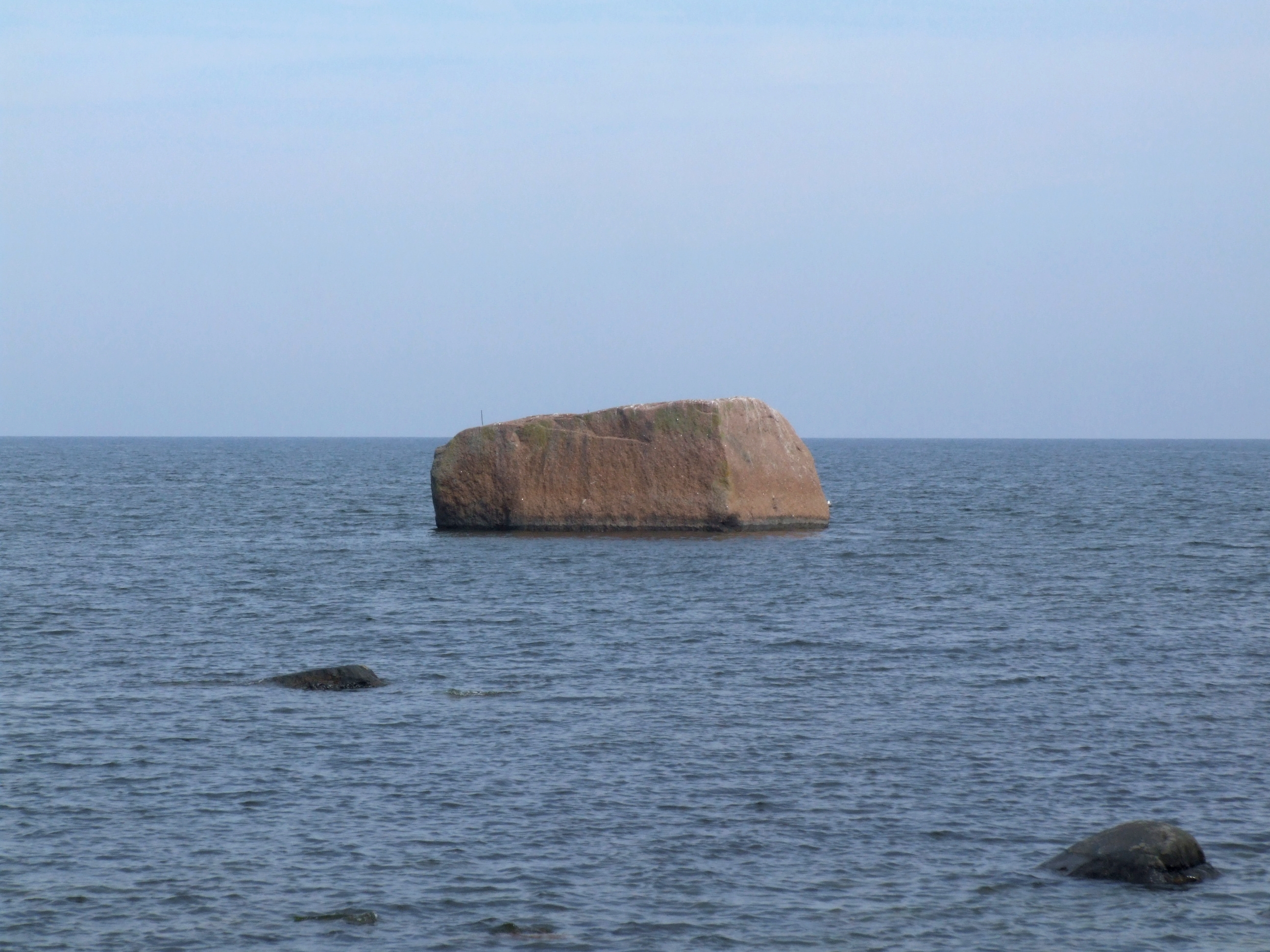
- Painuva kivi - boulder near village
- Interactive map of Turbuneeme
- Country: Estonia
- County: Harju County
- Parish: Kuusalu Parish
- Time zone: UTC+2 (EET)
  - Summer (DST): UTC+3 (EEST)

Turbuneeme is a village in Kuusalu Parish, Harju County in northern Estonia, on the territory of Lahemaa National Park. It's located on the Pärispea Peninsula.
