= Suurpea =

Village in Estonia

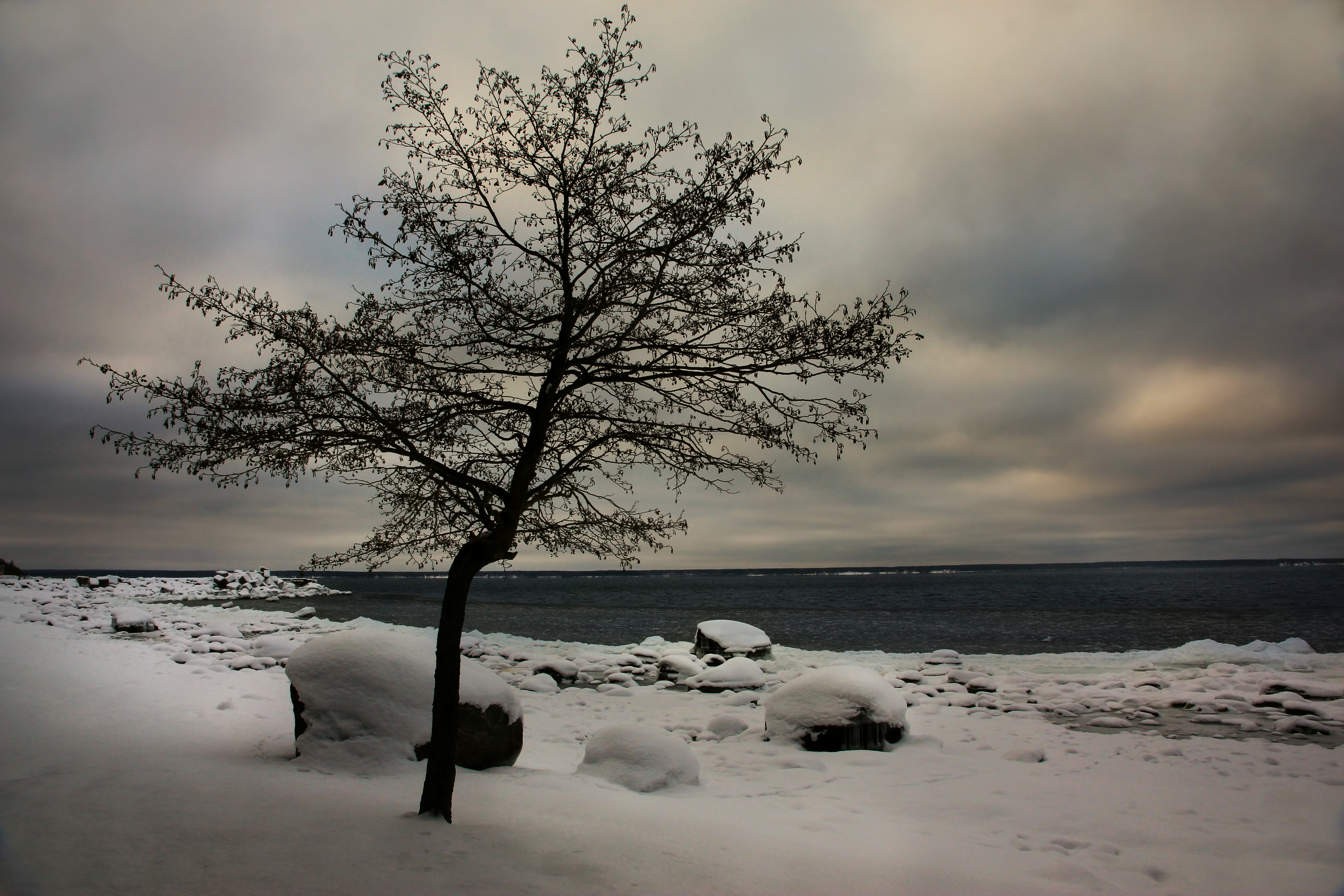
- Hara Bay in Suurpea

- Location within Estonia
- Coordinates: 59°37′N 25°42′E
- Country: Estonia
- County: Harju County

Population (1 January 2009)
  - Total: 163
- Time zone: UTC+2 (EET)

Suurpea is a village in Kuusalu Parish in Harju County in northern Estonia. The village has a population of 163 (as of 1 January 2009). It is situated on the western coast of the Pärispea Peninsula.
