= Aabra =

Village in Estonia

- Village
- Location in Estonia
- Coordinates: 57°40′21″N 27°00′56″E
- Country: Estonia
- County: Võru County
- Municipality: Rõuge Parish

Population (2021 census)
  - Total: 0

Aabra is an uninhabited village in Rõuge Parish, Võru County, in southeastern Estonia. It is located on the territory of Haanja Nature Park, about 8 km (5 mi) southeast of Rõuge, the administrative centre of the municipality, and about 18 km (11 mi) south of the nearest town Võru.

There is a 1.5 ha (3.7 acres) lake named Lake Aabra and two hills Jaanimägi and Pähkünämägi located in the village.
