= Purekkari Cape =

Cape in Estonia

Coordinates: 59°40′31″N 25°41′49″E

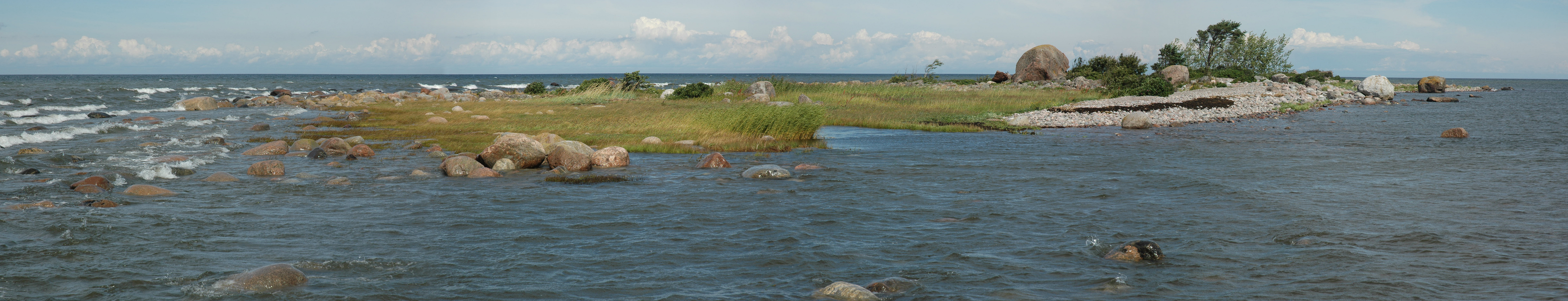
Cape Purekkari (2007)

Cape Purekkari (Estonian: Purekkari neem) is a cape in the village of Pärispea, Harju County, Estonia. It is the northernmost part of the Pärispea Peninsula, and it is also the northernmost land point of Estonia.

There are erratic boulders, such as Purekkari Maasäärekivi (:et).

The toponym Purekkari was first mentioned in 1798 in Atlas von Liefland.
