= Rodsher =

Russian island and lighthouse in the Gulf of Finland

Coordinates: 59°58′07″N 26°40′45″E

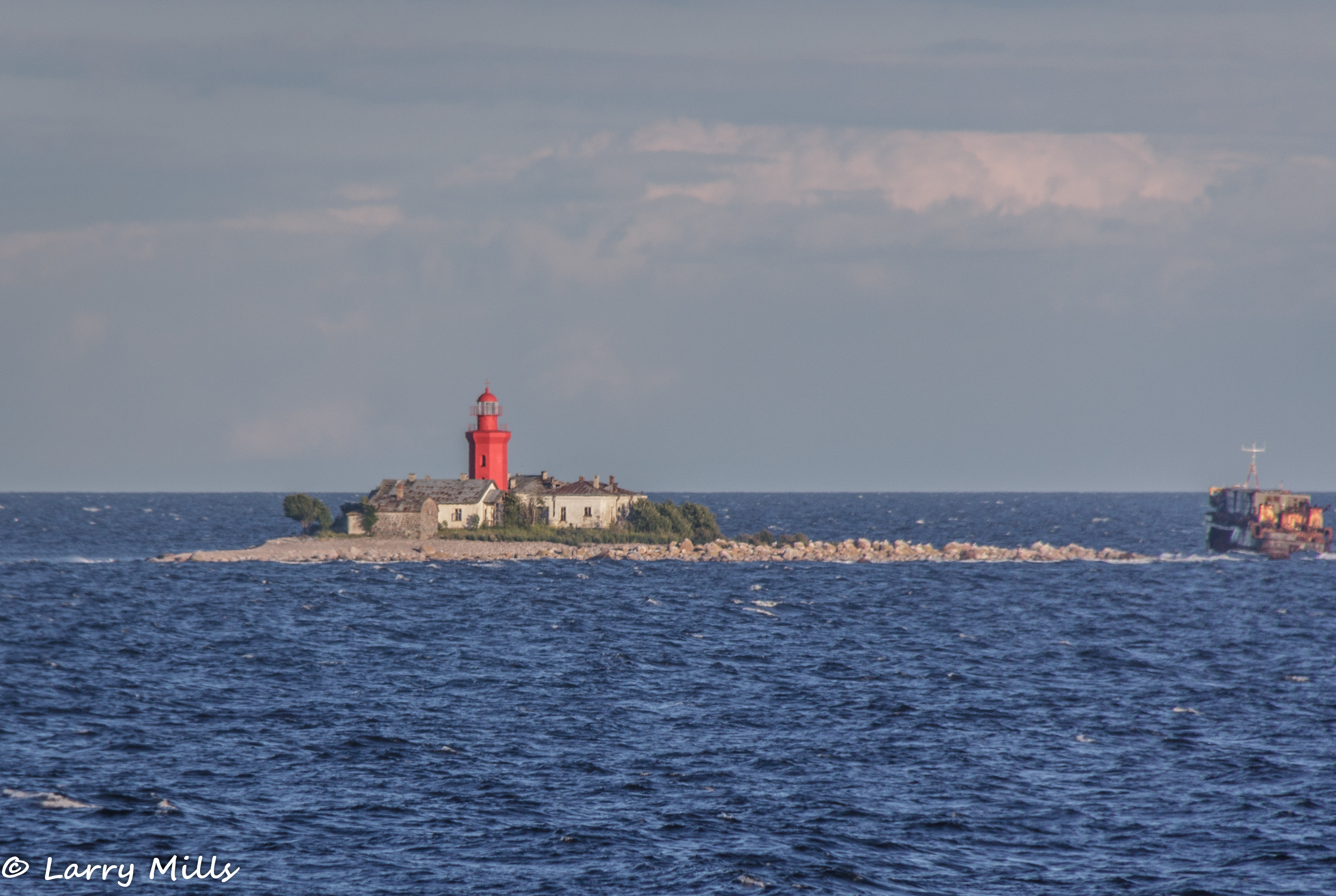
- Rodsher in 2019

Administration
- Russia
- Oblast: Kingiseppsky District, Leningrad Oblast

Additional information
- Time zone: UTC+3

Rodsher (Russian: Родшер; Swedish: Rödskär; German: Rodscher; Finnish: Ruuskeri; Estonian: Ruuskari), is an uninhabited small Russian island and a lighthouse, situated in the Gulf of Finland. It is located 16 kilometres (9 nmi) southwest of the island of Gogland and 24 kilometres (13 nmi) northeast of the Estonian island of Vaindloo.

== History ==
Throughout most of history stretching from the 12th century onwards the island belonged to Sweden, up until the Russian Empire's annexation of Finland in 1809, after the conclusion of the Finnish War. The island belonged to Finland from its independence in 1917, until the end of the Continuation War in 1944, when it was once more ceded to the Soviet Union in accordance with the Moscow Armistice.

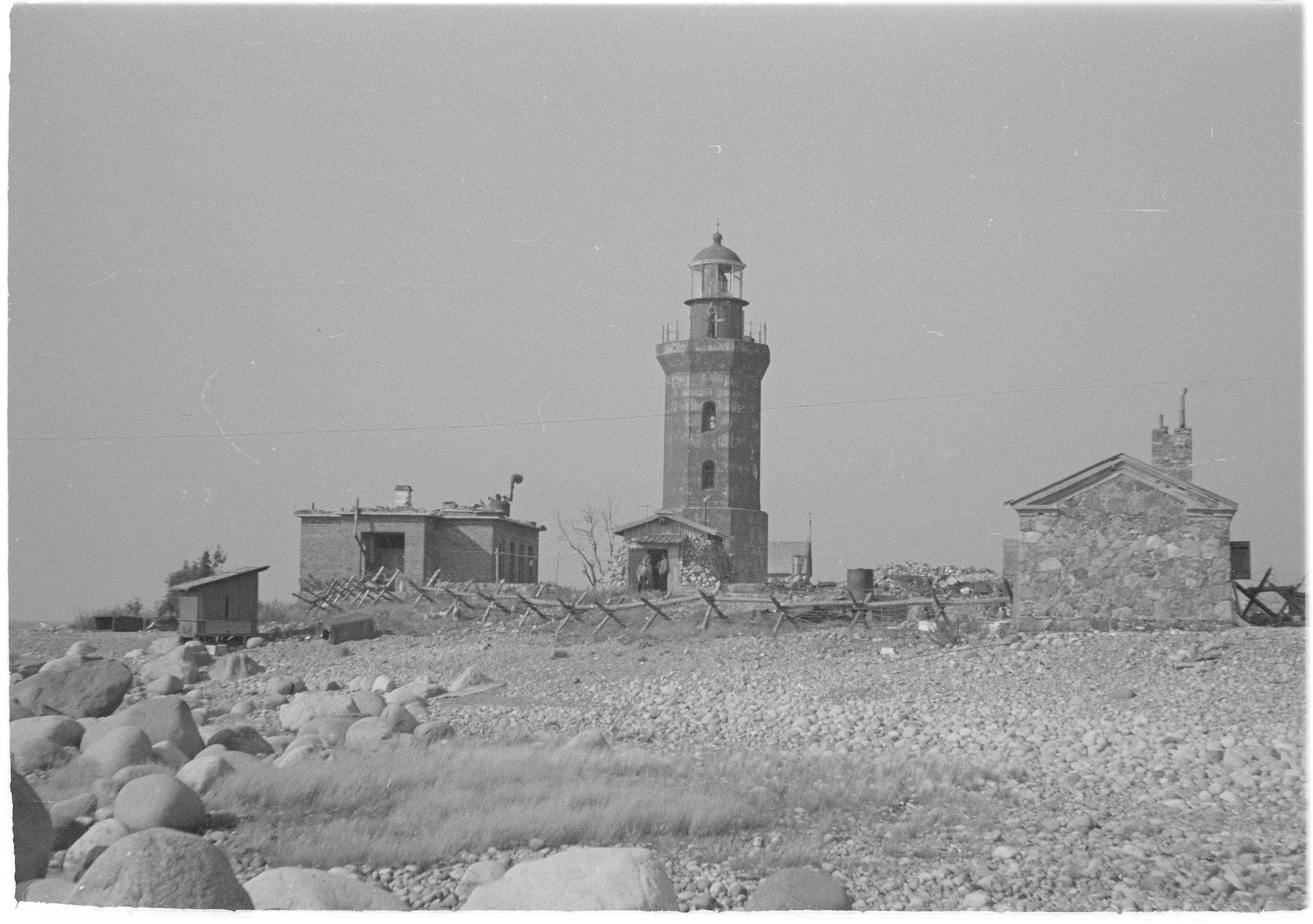
The buildings in 1944

A first wooden lighthouse was constructed in 1806. It was replaced with a brick structure about 60 years later, and reinforced again by the Soviet Union. There are also some single storey buildings for lighthouse keepers.

When part of the Soviet Union, a straight baseline segment from Rodsher to Vaindloo, now Estonian, formed part of a series of baselines used to calculate the extent of Soviet Union territorial waters. The now incomplete system of straight baselines creates some uncertainty to the maritime boundary in the area of the island and the position of the potential Estonia–Finland–Russia equidistance maritime tripoint. As of May 2021, a 2014 draft treaty on the border had not been ratified by either party.

== See also ==
- Gogland
- Moshchny Island
- Seskar
- Sommers Light
- Kotlin Island
- Bolshoy Tyuters
- Sestroretsk
- Beryozovye Islands
