= Pärispea =

Village in Estonia

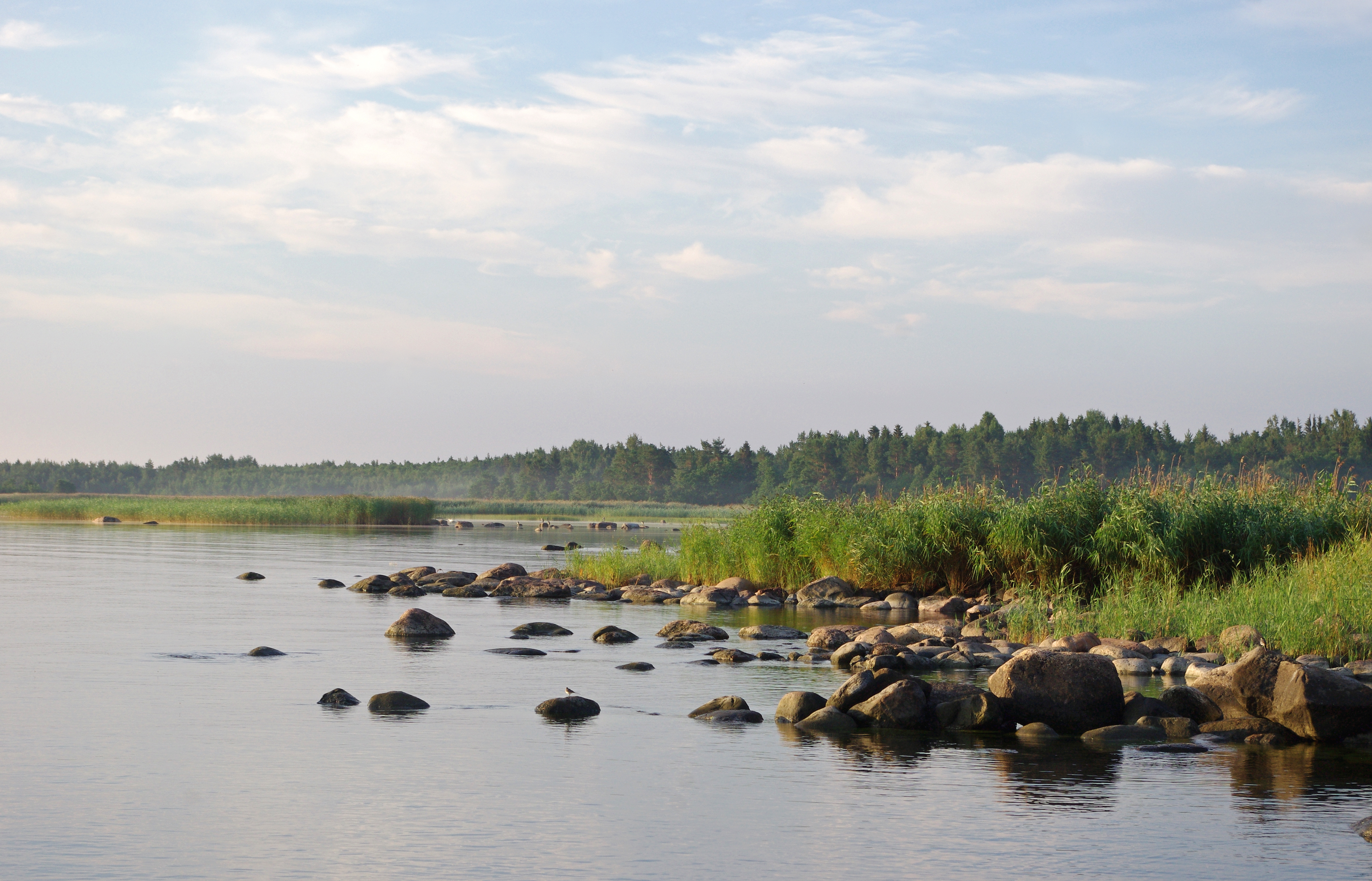
- Hauaneeme Bay in Pärispea

- Location within Estonia
- Coordinates: 59°39′N 25°42′E
- Country: Estonia
- County: Harju County

Population (1 January 2009)
  - Total: 109
- Time zone: UTC+2 (EET)

Pärispea is a village in Kuusalu Parish in Harju County in northern Estonia. The village has a population of 109 (as of 1 January 2009). The village is situated on the northern end of the Pärispea Peninsula.

Pärispea is the northernmost settlement in mainland Estonia and the contiguous states of the European Union, with Purekkari Cape a kilometer north of the village being the northernmost point.
