= Suur Munamägi Tower =

Observation tower in Estonia

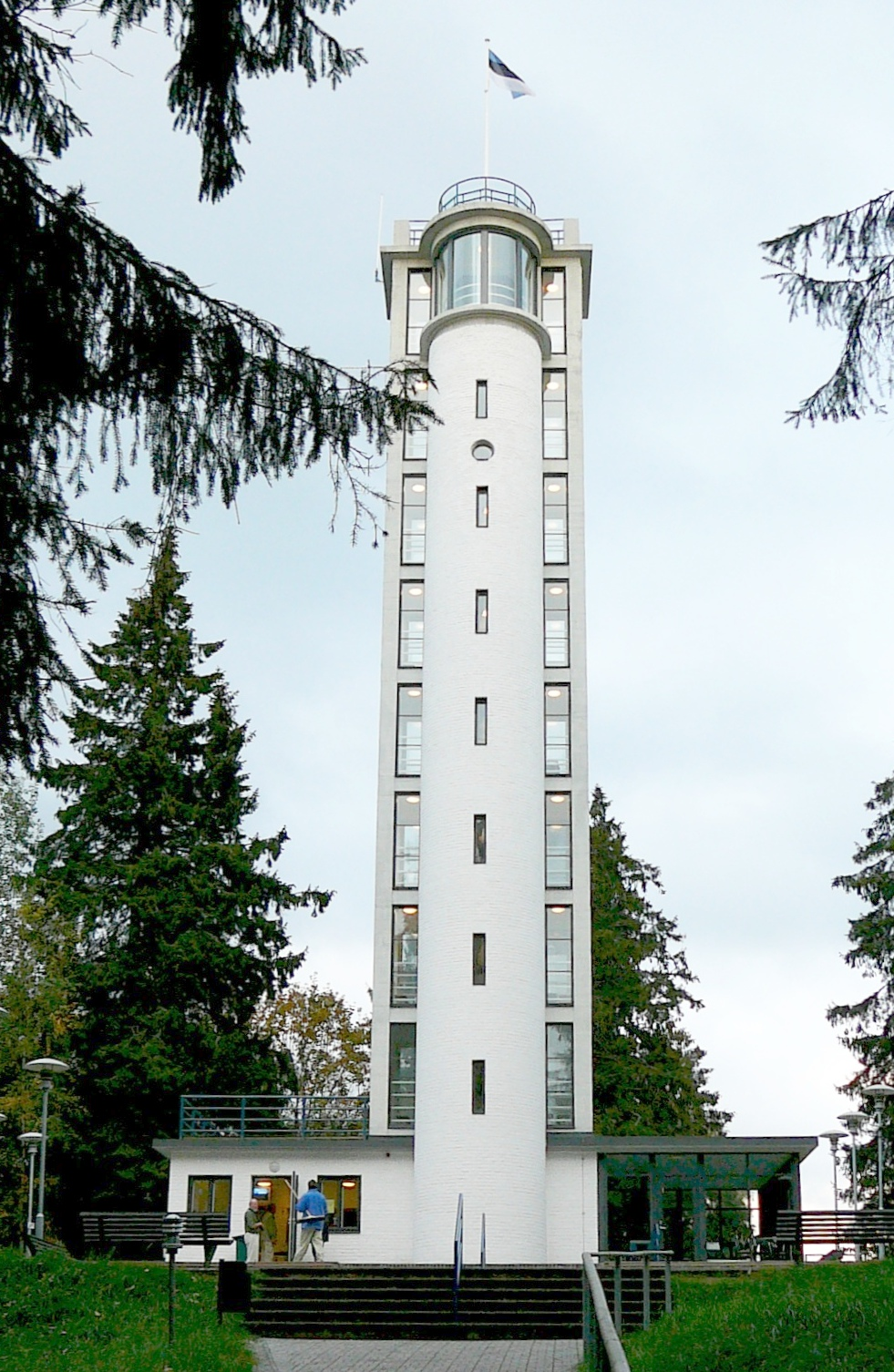
- Suur Munamägi Tower
- Interactive map of the Suur Munamägi Tower area

General information
- Coordinates: 57°42′54″N 27°03′19″E
- Inaugurated: 24 July 2005

Suur Munamägi Tower (Estonian: Suure Munamäe vaatetorn) is an observation tower on the top of Estonia's highest hill: Suur Munamägi; located in Võru County.

== History ==
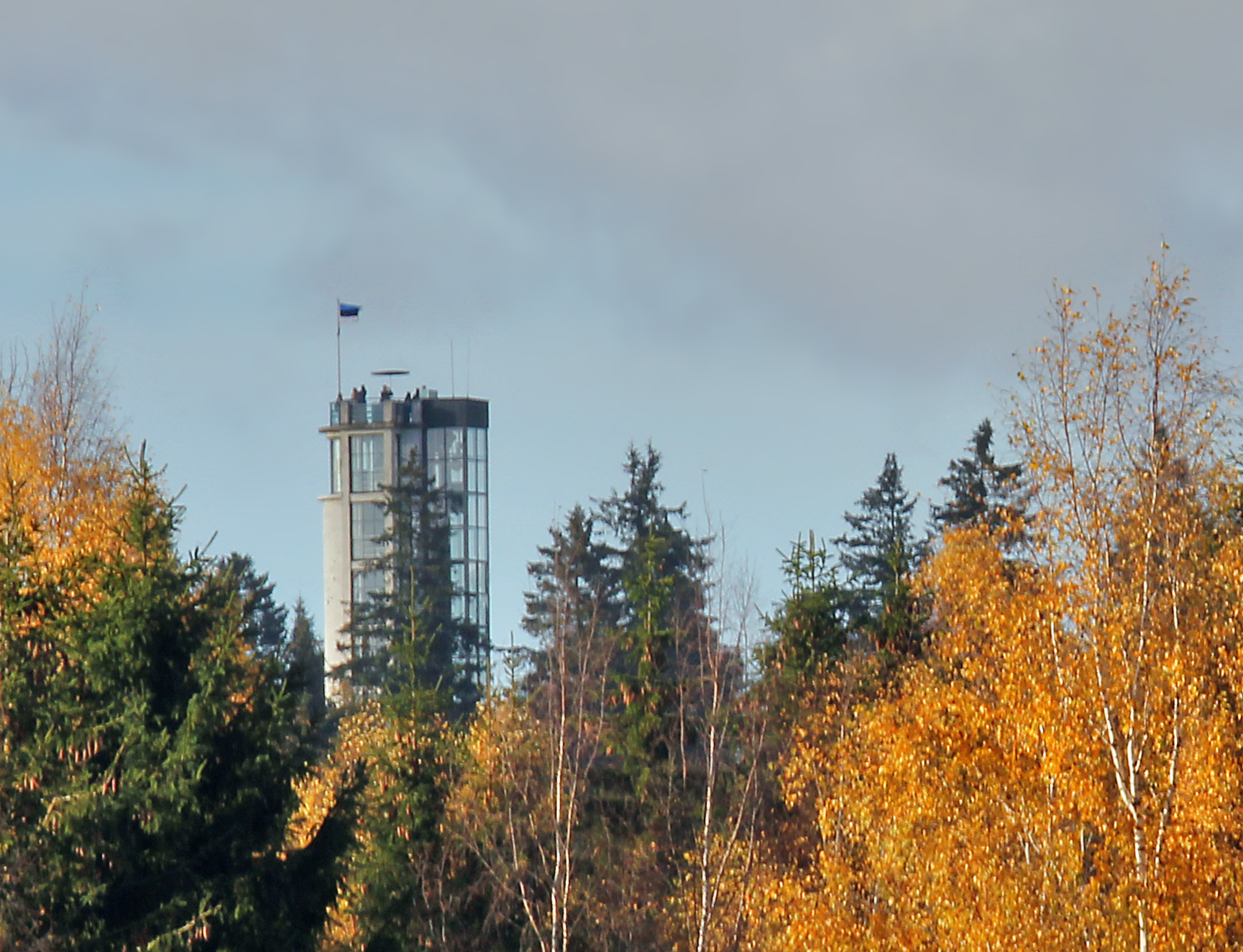
Observation Tower on Suur Munamägi

On the hill, there have been 5 towers. The first tower, built in 1812, is the subject of a folk legend: it was supposedly destroyed because it confused ships headed toward the coast. The second tower was built in 1870 by a local barman. The tower was 8 metres (26 ft) high. The tower was popular amongst local people because of its bar. Only 4–5 people fit in the tower and the trees started to ruin the view.

The third tower was built on the same building as the second tower. The tower was built up to 12 metres (39 ft).

The fourth tower was built in 1925, when Estonia was an independent state. The tower was built in 3 months and it was 17 metres (56 ft) high. The Võru county then built paths for people, cleaned the forest and put benches in front of the tower. The fourth tower was ceremonially opened on 19 July 1925. Soon after that people realized that the wooden tower was old and again the trees started blocking the view — 17 metres was not high enough.

The new fifth tower was built of ferroconcrete in 1939. The tower was made 25.7 metres (84 ft) high. It was built of 36 000 bricks and 80 tons of cement which all were carried up to the mountain. The tower was finished in the same year in June but the ceremonial opening was cancelled because of World War II. The tower was not seriously harmed in war and the repair was made in 1955. The Memorial Museum of Fr.R. Kreutzwald that was at that time the owner of the tower, started to modernize the tower and fix its surroundings.

In 1969 the museum built an additional floor on the top of the tower and changed the construction of the stairway on the top floors. The add-on was engineered by Toomas Rein and Veljo Kaasik. The tower was now 29.1 metres (95 ft) high. The view from the height of 346.7 metres (1,137 ft) is 50 kilometres (31 mi) in radius.

A renovation project of the tower was started in 1998 by Haanja parish. In 1999–2000, architect Toomas Rein carried it out. In 2002 the piping of the tower was engineered and completed next year. From August 2004 to July 2005 major renovation works were made on Suur Munamägi: the observation tower was renovated, the tower's elevator and glass café were built, the paths to the tower re-made, the lightning of the pedestrian path and the tower was made. The total cost of the works was 10 million kroons. The construction was financed by the EU Phare program, Enterprise Estonia, the Estonian government, Environmental Investment Centre, private supporters and the budget of the parish.

On 24 July 2005 the renovated observation tower of Suur Munamägi was festively opened.
