= Haanja Landscape Conservation Area =

Protected area in Estonia

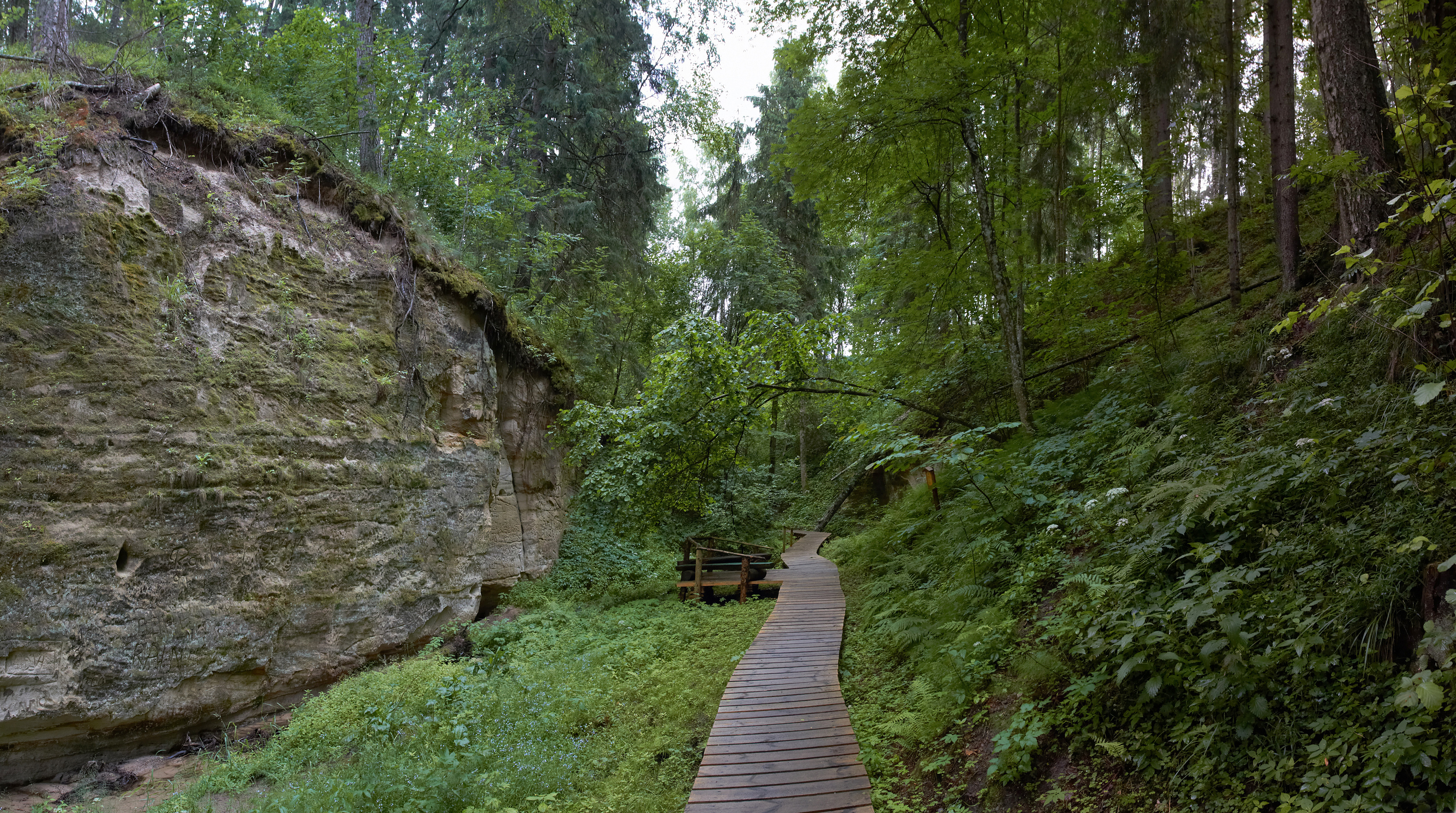
- Hinn Canyon

- Location within Estonia
- Location: Estonia
- Coordinates: 57°43′N 27°02′E
- Area: 17,040 ha (42,100 acres)
- Established: 1957 (2015)

Haanja Landscape Conservation Area is a nature park situated in Võru County, Estonia.

Its area is 17040 ha.

The protected area was designated in 1957 to protect areas and nature of Haanja Parish (including Suur Munamägi, Vällamägi and Rõuge lakes). In 1979, the protected area was redesigned to the landscape conservation area. It is now located in Rõuge Parish and Võru Parish.
