= Vaindloo Lighthouse =

Lighthouse in Estonia

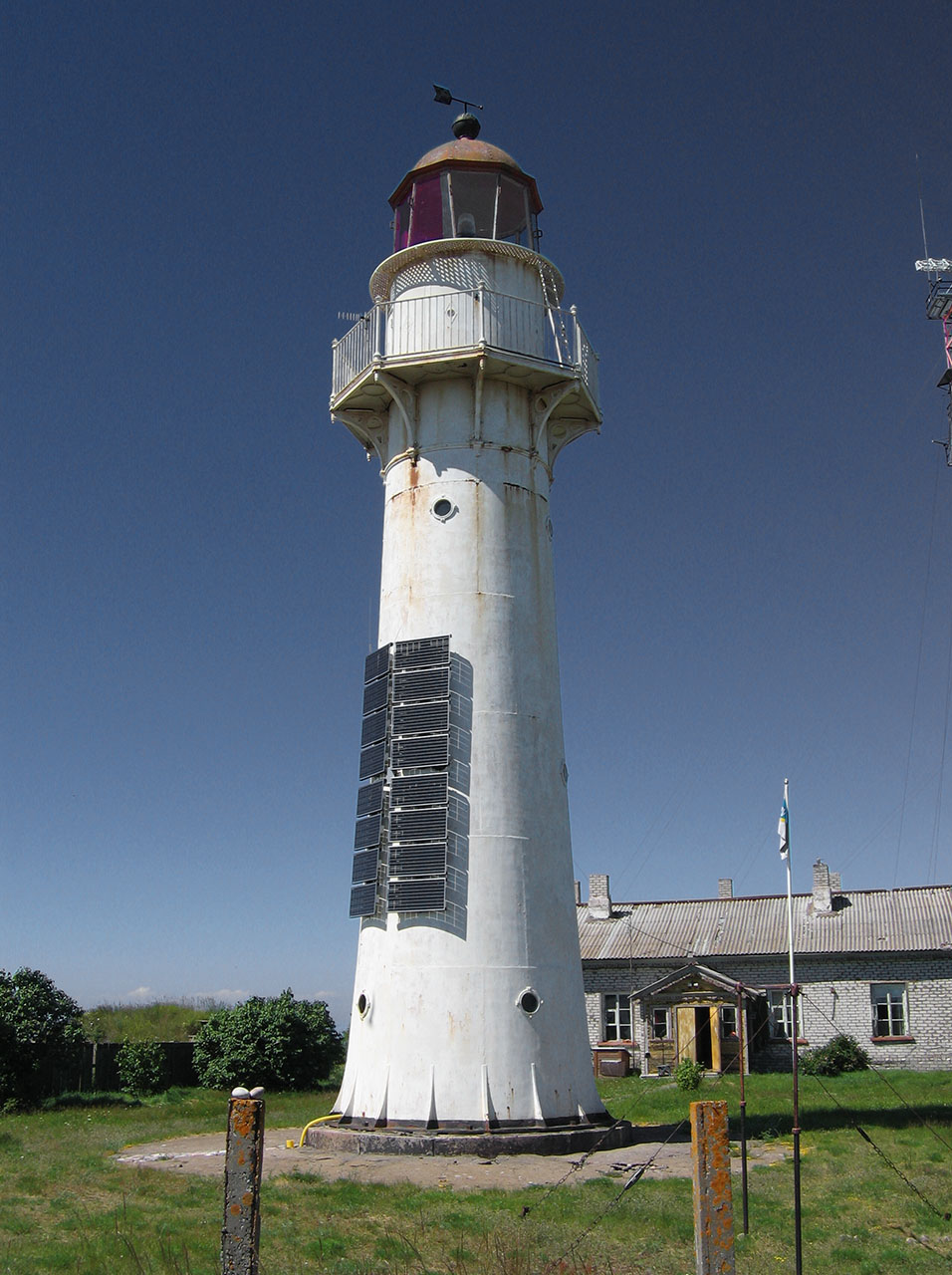
- Location: Vaindloo, Gulf of Finland, Estonia
- Coordinates: 59°49′0″N 26°21′0″E

Tower
- Constructed: 1718 (first)
- Construction: cast iron
- Height: 17 metres (56 ft)
- Shape: cylindrical tower with balcony and lantern
- Markings: white tower and red lantern dome
- Power source: solar power

Light
- First lit: 1871 (current)
- Focal height: 20 metres (66 ft)
- Intensity: 4,800 candela
- Range: 11 nmi (20 km)
- Characteristic: Fl W 15s, Fl R 15s
- Estonia no.: EVA 045

Vaindloo Lighthouse (Estonian: Vaindloo tuletorn) is a lighthouse located on the island of Vaindloo (in the Gulf of Finland), in Estonia. The lighthouse was originally built in Vormsi, however it was moved to Vaindloo in 1871, when the old beacon had collapsed. The lighthouse serves as a signal on the shipping routes between the Estonian town of Kunda and the Finnish town of Porvoo. The first lighthouse built on the island of Vaindloo was ordered by Tsar Peter the Great in the year of 1718.

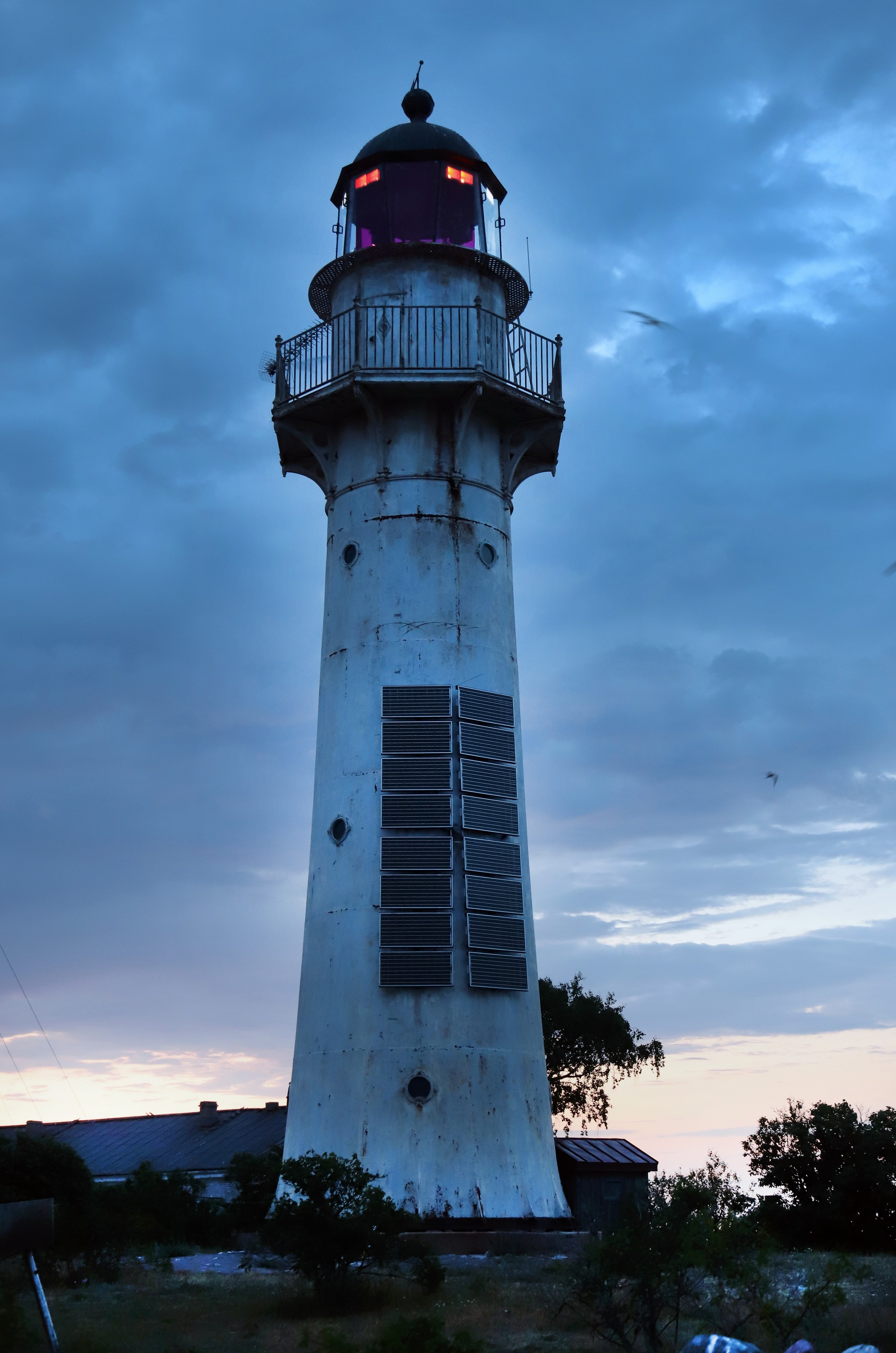

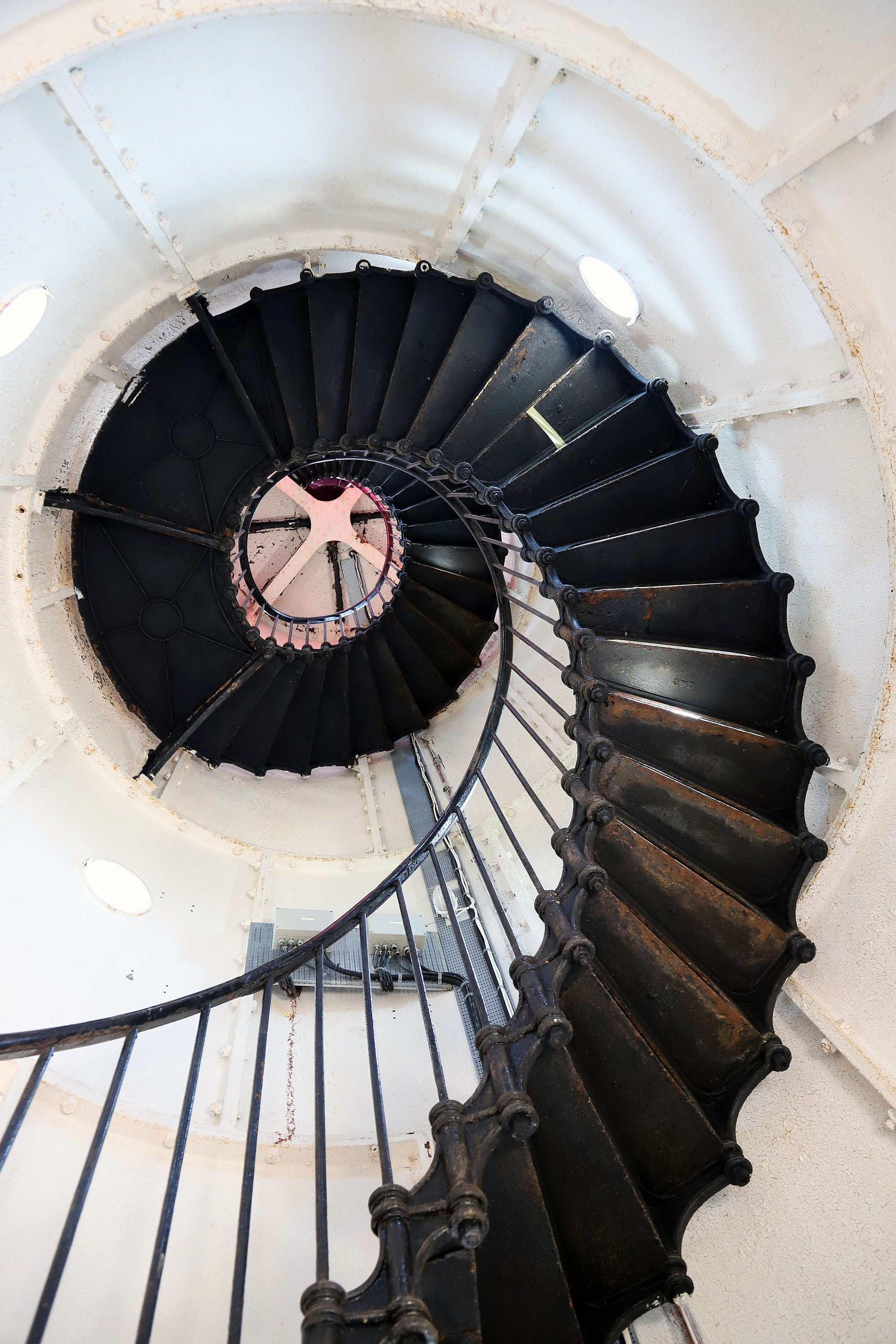

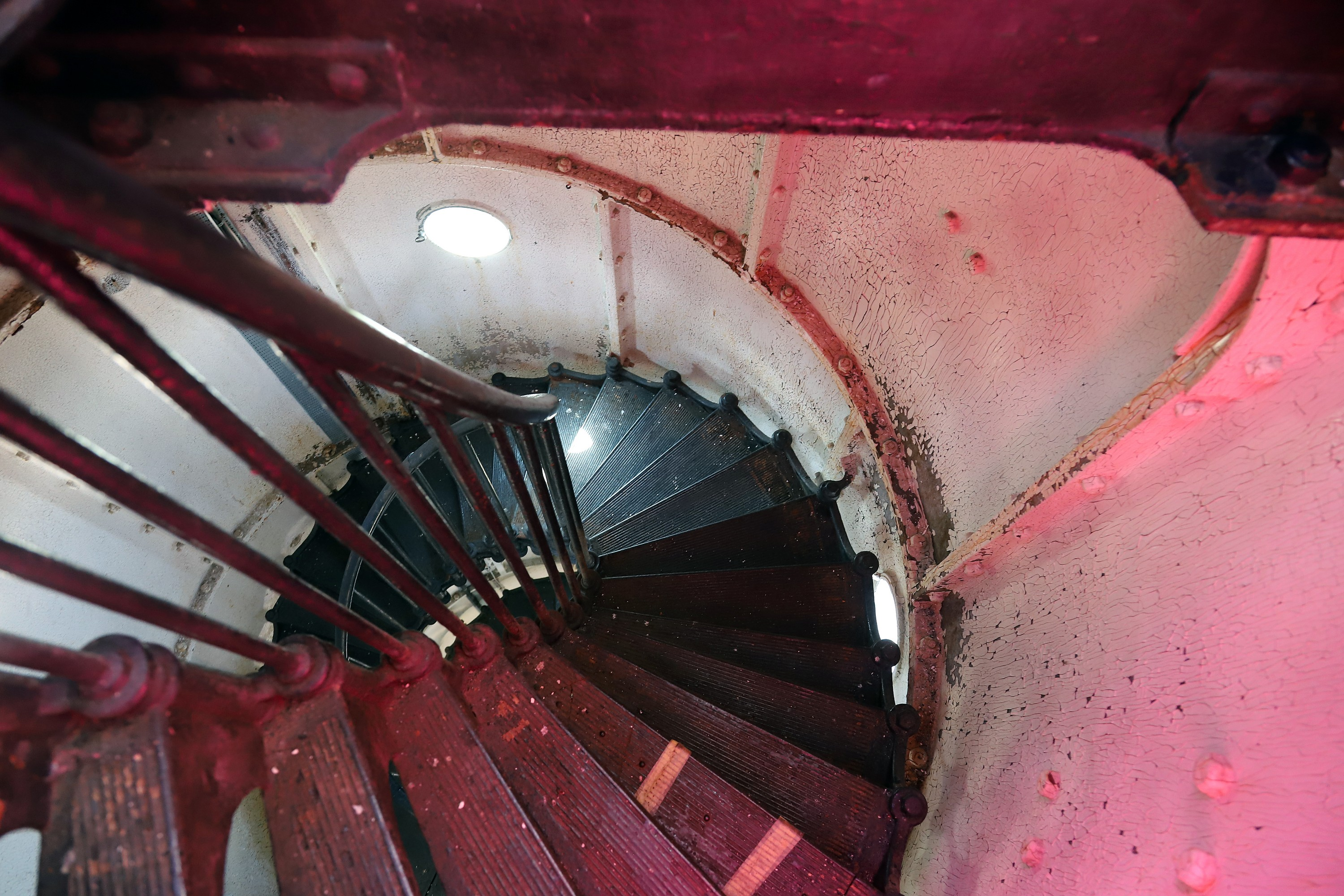

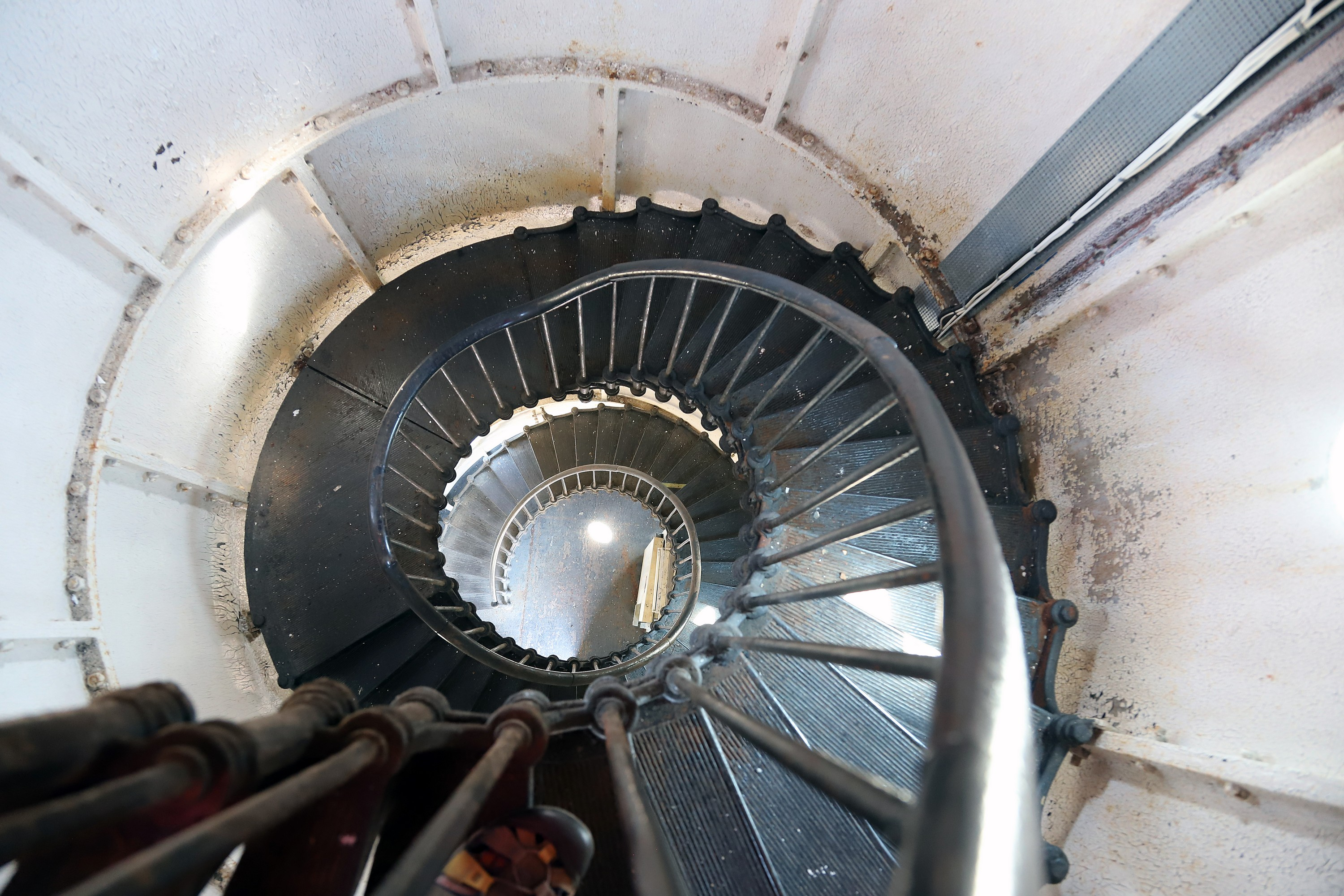

== See also ==
- List of lighthouses in Estonia
