= Suur Munamägi =

Highest mountain in Estonia

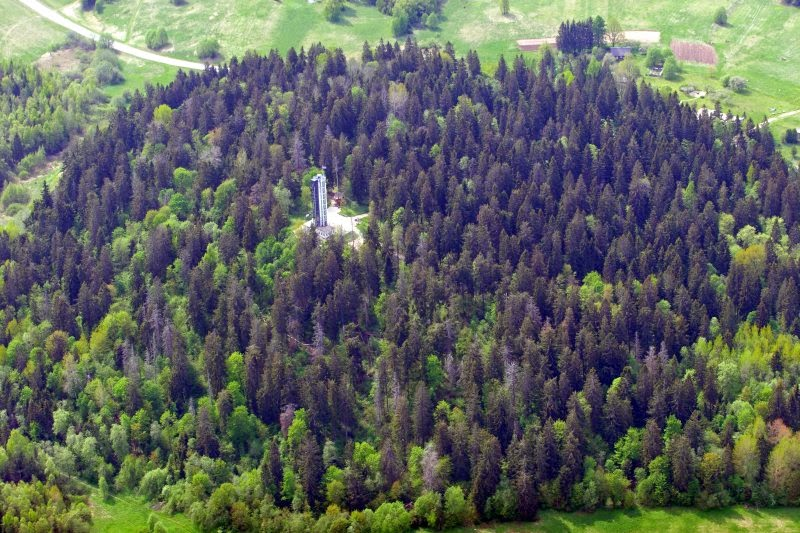
- Suur Munamägi seen from north-east

Highest point
- Elevation: 318 m (1,043 ft)
- Listing: Country high point
- Coordinates: 57°42′52″N 27°03′33″E

Geography
- Location within Estonia
- Location: Haanja, Võru County, Estonia

Suur Munamägi (Estonian pronunciation: [ˈsuːr ˈmunɑ.mæɡi]; translation 'Big Egg Mountain') is the highest peak in Estonia (and the Baltic states), reaching 318 metres (1,043 ft) above sea level. It is located near the village of Haanja, in Võru County in the southeastern corner of Estonia, close to the borders of both Latvia and Russia. The landscape around the peak—the Haanja Upland—is gently hilly.

== Name ==
Suur Munamägi was attested in historical sources as Munna Mäggi in 1790, and as Mun̄a Mäggi and Eyer Berg in 1798. The name derives from comparison of its rounded shape with an egg (Estonian: muna). The metaphor is frequent in oronyms because there are at least 19 hills named Munamägi in the historical county of Võrumaa.

== Tower ==
The Suur Munamägi Tower is located at the top of the peak.

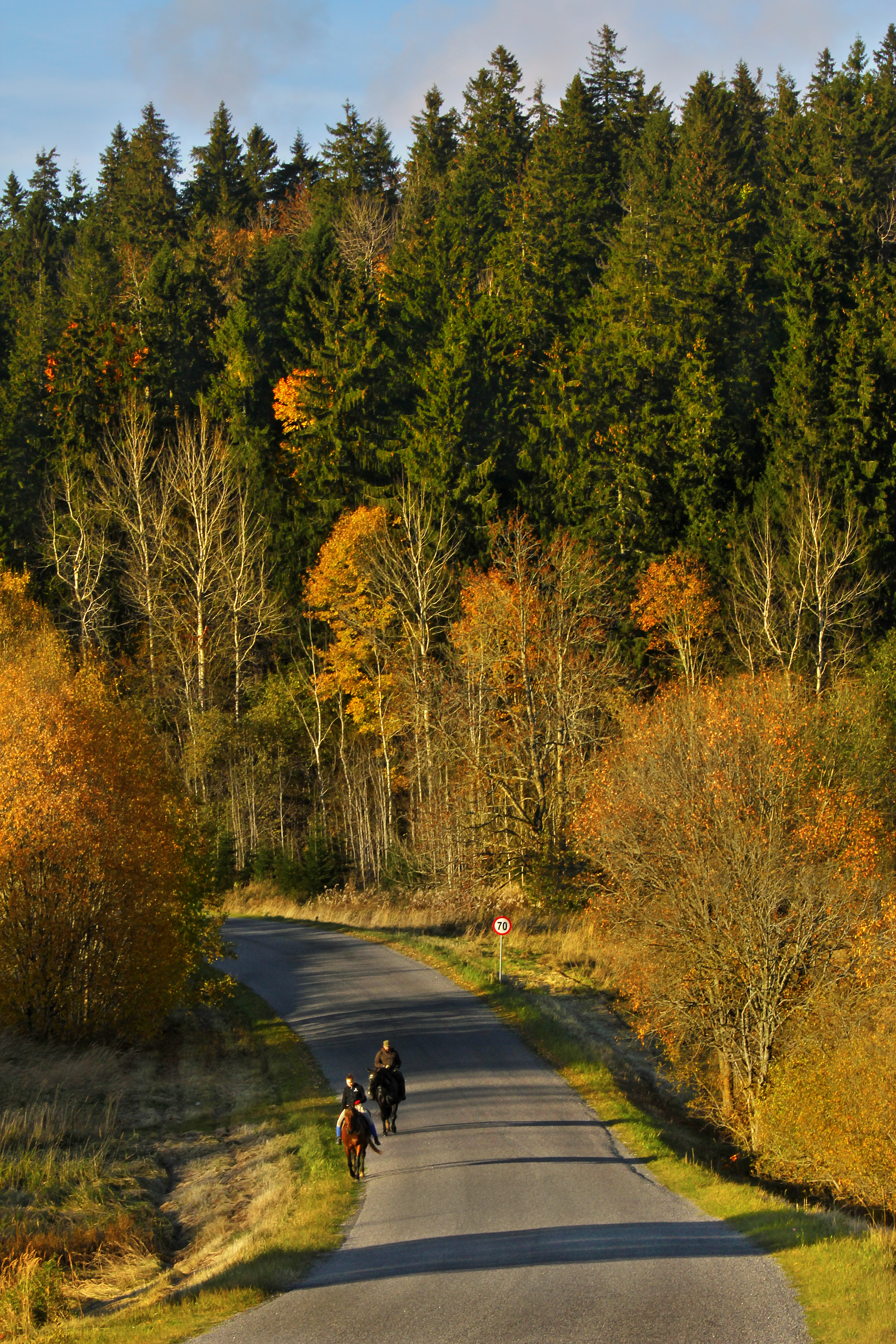
Mount Suur Munamägi in southern Estonia

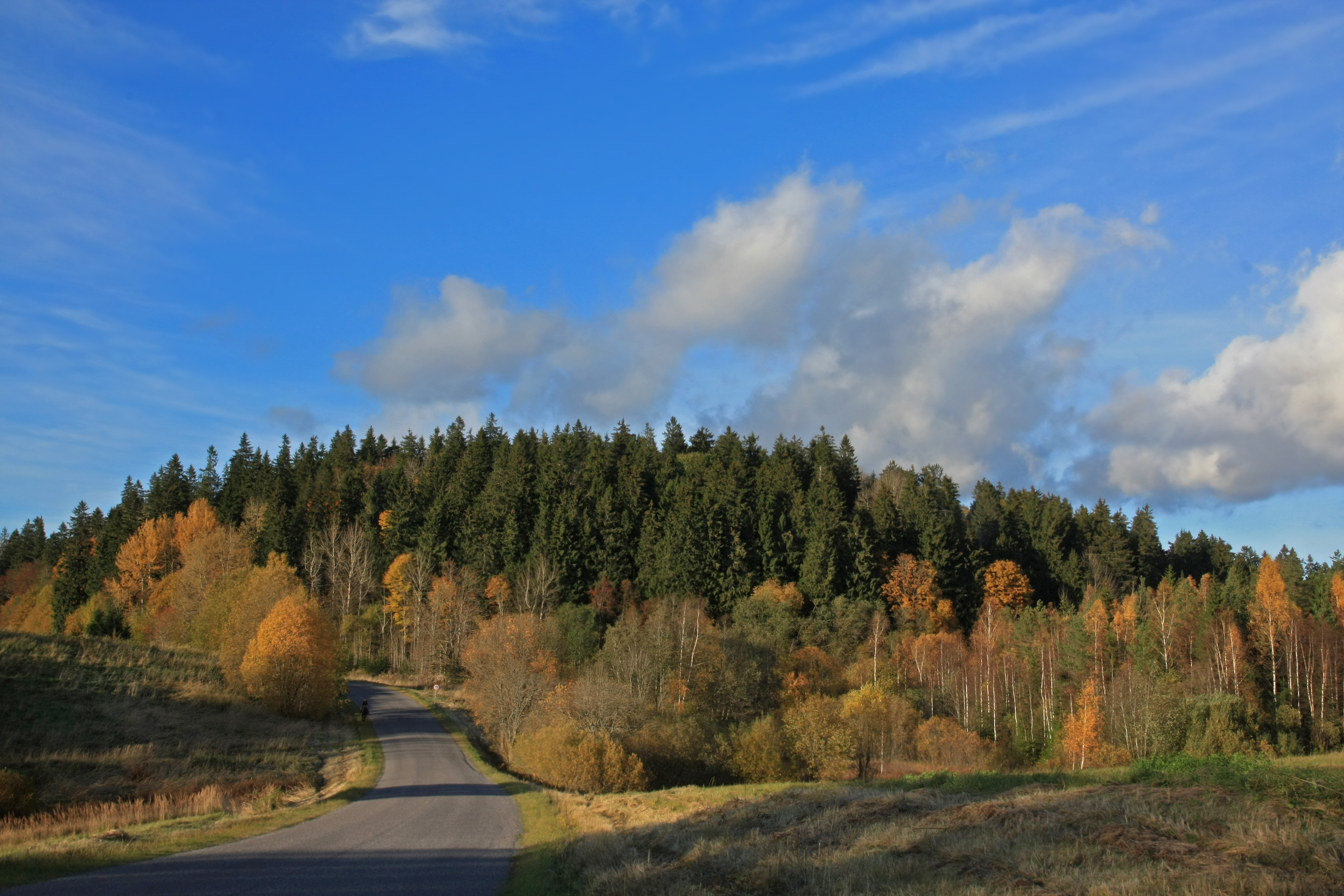
Suur Munamägi in southern Estonia

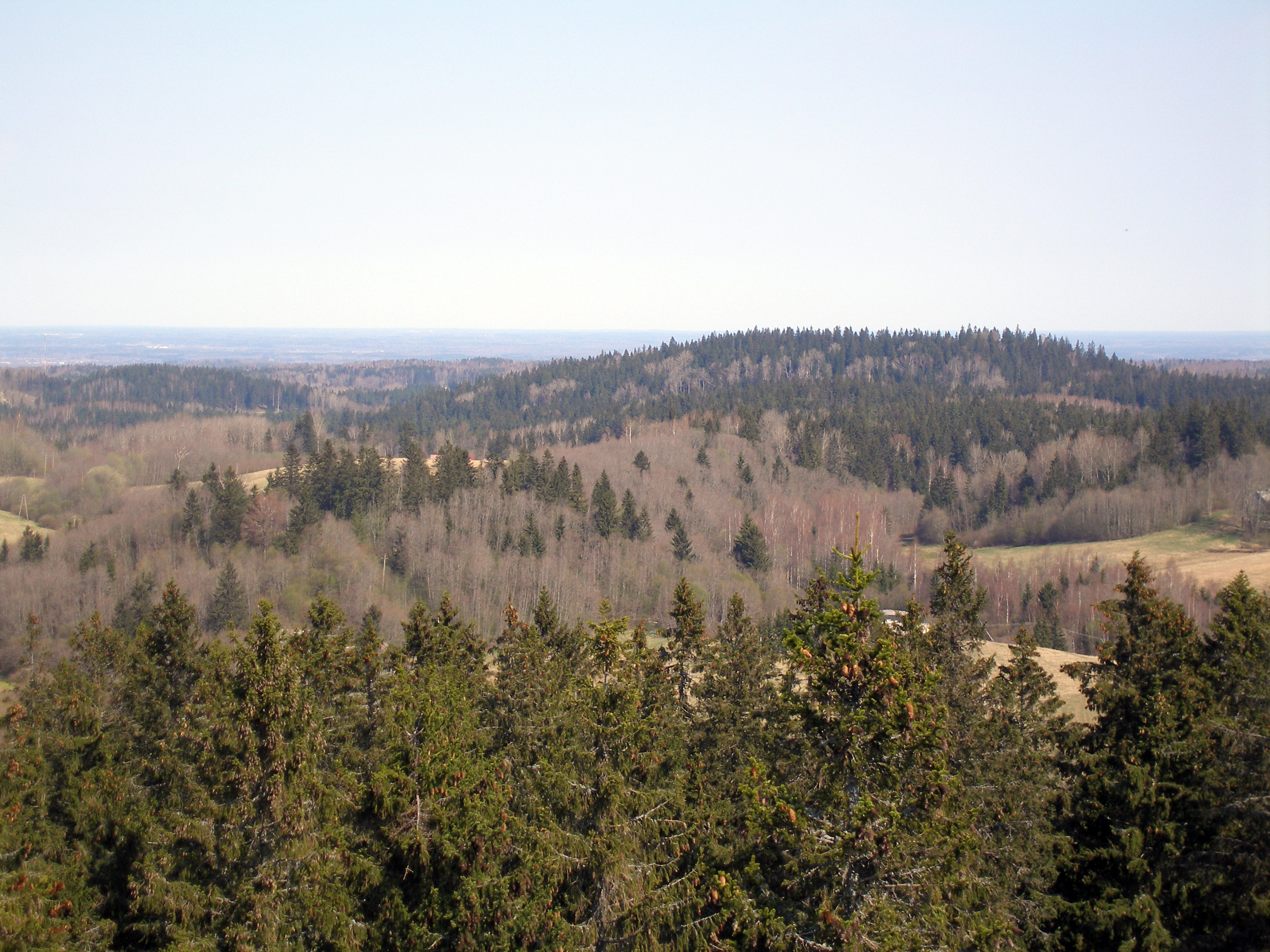
Hilly and forested landscape around Suur Munamägi

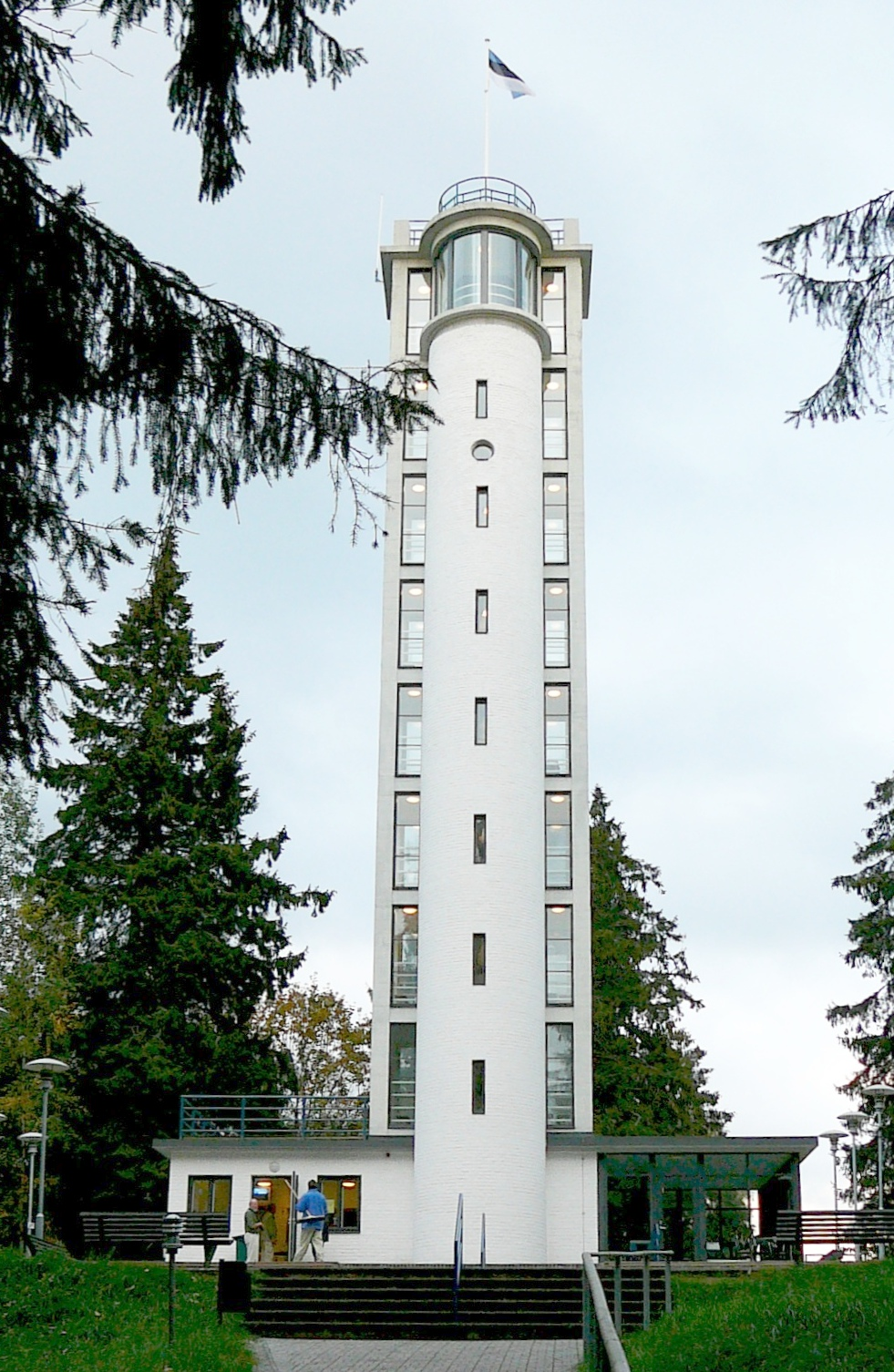
Suur Munamägi Tower

== See also ==
- Extreme points of Estonia
