= Haanja =

Village in Estonia

Haanja Haani (in Võro)
- Village
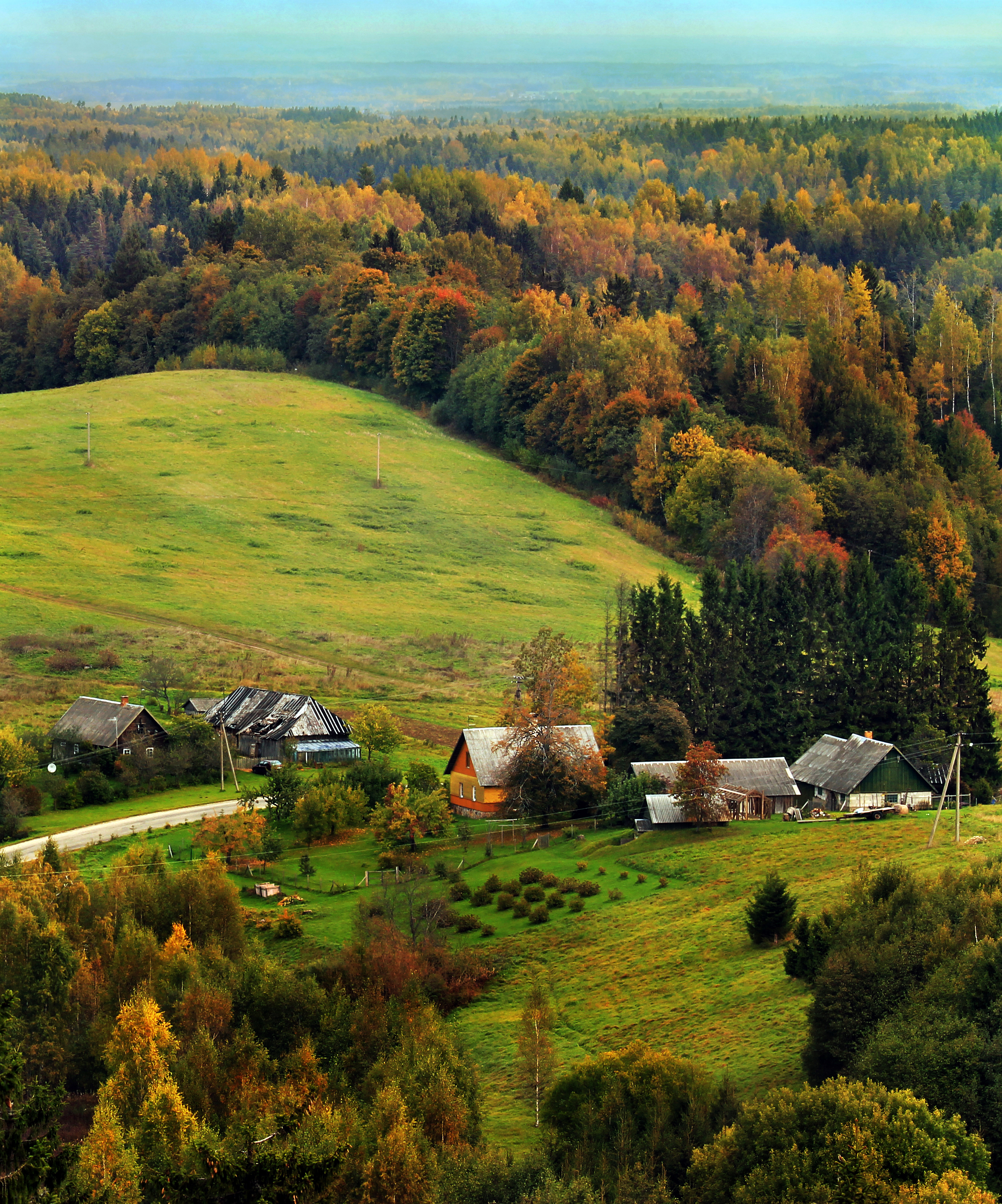
- View from Suur Munamägi

- Location in Estonia
- Coordinates: 57°43′08″N 27°03′08″E
- Country: Estonia
- County: Võru County
- Municipality: Rõuge Parish

Population (2004)
  - Total: 191

Haanja (Võro: Haani; German: Hahnshof) is a village in Rõuge Parish, Võru County, in southeastern Estonia. It's located 16 km south from the town of Võru. Between 1991 and 2017 (until the administrative reform of Estonian municipalities) the village was the administrative centre of Haanja Parish. The village had a population of 191 (as of 2004).

Suur Munamägi, the highest peak in Estonia (and the Baltic states), reaching 318 metres (1,043 ft) above sea level, is located in Haanja.

Haanja has also a ski centre and Haanja school.

In motorsports, Haanja also frequently hosts some stages of the South Estonian Rally.
