= Uhtju islands =

Estonian archipelago in the Gulf of Finland

- Location within Estonia

Geography
- Location: Gulf of Finland
- Coordinates: 59°40′33″N 26°30′39″E

Administration
- Estonia
- County: Lääne-Viru County

The Uhtju islands (Estonian: Uhtju saared; Swedish: Utöarna) are an Estonian archipelago in the Baltic Sea, specifically in the Gulf of Finland.

The largest islands are Uhtju Island (Hofti) or North Uhtju (10.1 ha) and Sala Island or South Uhtju (6.2 ha).

The Uhtja islands are known to be the only places of growth of sedge grass in Estonia. This species is now believed to be extirpated from the islands.

Uhtju islands are Uhtju island (Põhja-Uhtju) and Sala island (Lõuna-Uhtju).

== Literature ==
- G. Vilbaste. Plants under nature protection. New Estonia, August 18, 1936, no. 222, p. 5.

== See also ==
- List of islands of Estonia
