= Pärispea Peninsula =

Peninsula in Estonia

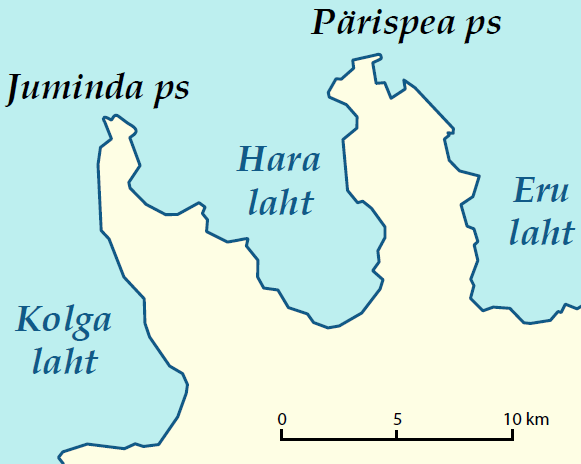
- Interactive map of Pärispea Peninsula

Geography
- Coordinates: 59°39′18″N 25°40′19″E
- Adjacent to: Gulf of Finland

Administration
- Estonia
- County: Harju County
- Municipality: Kuusalu Parish
- Settlement: Pärispea

The Pärispea Peninsula (Estonian: Pärispea poolsaar) is a peninsula in Kuusalu Parish in Harju County, Estonia, 60 km east of the capital Tallinn.
