= Holdi =

Holdi may refer to several places in Estonia:

- Holdi, Rõuge Parish, village in Rõuge Parish, Võru County
- Holdi, Setomaa Parish, village in Setomaa Parish, Võru County
