= Kirbu =

Kirbu may refer to several places in Estonia:

- Kirbu, Valga County, village in Estonia
- Kirbu, Võru County, village in Estonia
