= Põru =

Põru may refer to several places in Estonia:

- Põru, Valga County, village in Estonia
- Põru, Võru County, village in Estonia
