= Tiidu =

Tiidu may refer to several places in Estonia:

- Tiidu, Valga County, village in Estonia
- Tiidu, Võru County, village in Estonia
