= Shin-Koganei Station =

Railway station in Koganei, Tokyo, Japan

SW02 Shin-Koganei Station 新小金井駅
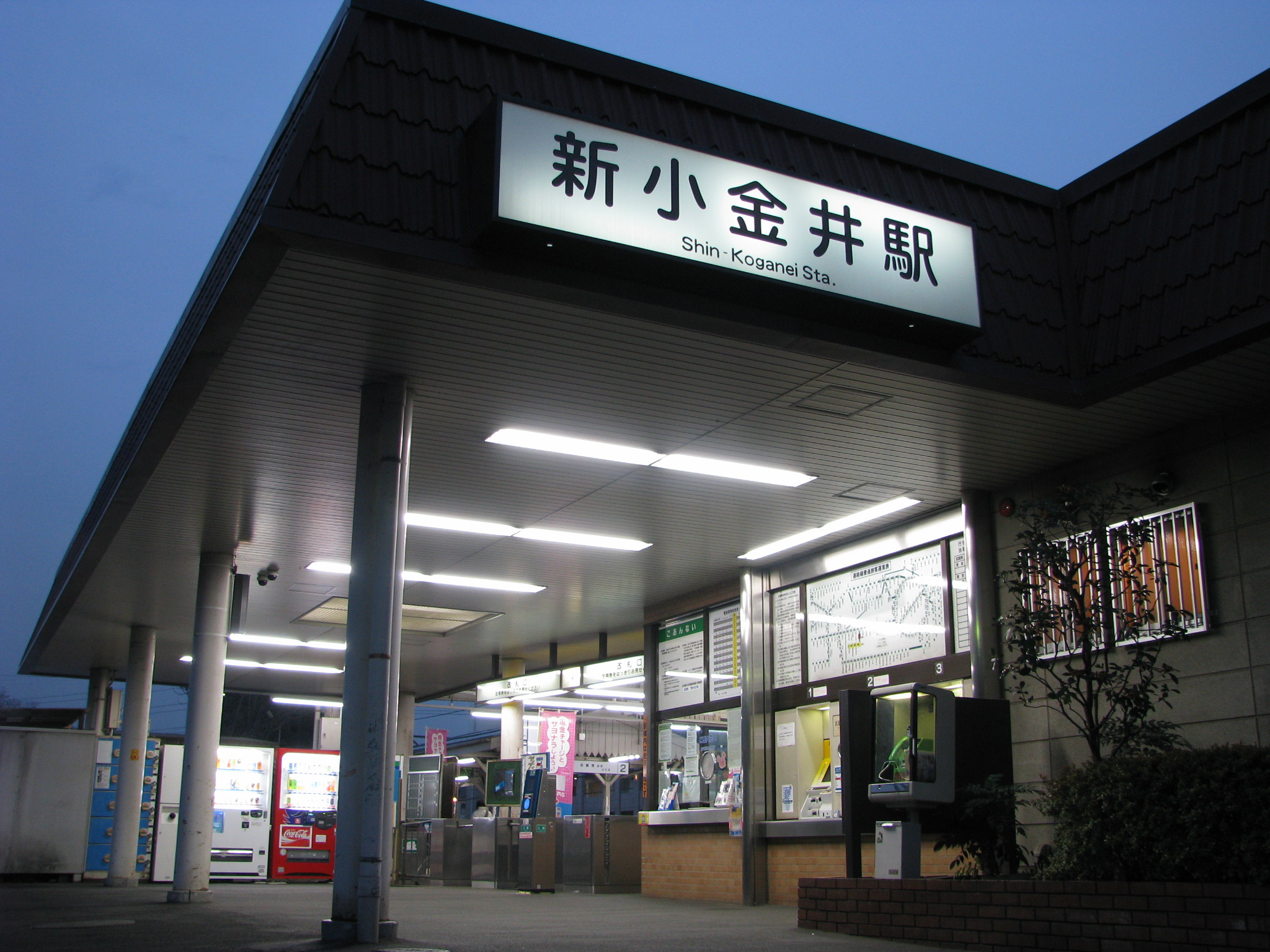
- Shin-Koganei Station entrance, 2008

General information
- Location: 4-23-1 Higashi-cho, Koganei-shi, Tokyo 184-0011; Japan
- Coordinates: 35.6958°N 139.5264°E
- Operator: Seibu Railway
- Line: Seibu Tamagawa Line
- Distance: 8.0 km from Musashi-Sakai
- Platforms: 2 side platforms

Other information
- Station code: SW02
- Website: Official website

History
- Opened: October 22, 1917

Passengers
- FY 2019: 4,041 daily

Services
Preceding station	Seibu Railway	Following station
Tama SW03 towards Koremasa	Tamagawa Line	Musashi-Sakai SW01 Terminus
Location
- Location within Tokyo Location within Japan

Shin-Koganei Station (新小金井駅, Shin-Koganei-eki) is a passenger railway station located in the city of Koganei, Tokyo, Japan.

== Lines ==
Tama Station is served by the Seibu Tamagawa Line, and is 4.1 kilometers from the terminus of the line at Musashi-Sakai in Tokyo.

== Station layout ==
The station has two opposed ground-level side platforms serving two tracks, connected by a level crossing.

=== Platforms ===
1	■ Seibu Tamagawa Line	for Koremasa
2	■ Seibu Tamagawa Line	for Musashi-Sakai

== History ==
The station was opened on October 22, 1917.

Station numbering was introduced on all Seibu Railway lines during fiscal 2012, with Shin-Koganei Station becoming "SW02".

== Passenger statistics ==
In fiscal 2019, the station was the 80th busiest on the Seibu network with an average of 4,041 passengers daily.

The passenger figures for previous years are as shown below.

Fiscal year	Daily average
2005	3,046
2010	3,652
2015	3,683

== Surrounding area ==
- International Christian University
- International Christian University High School

== See also ==
- List of railway stations in Japan
