= Shiraitodai Station =

Railway station in Fuchū, Tokyo, Japan

SW04 Shiraitodai Station 白糸台駅
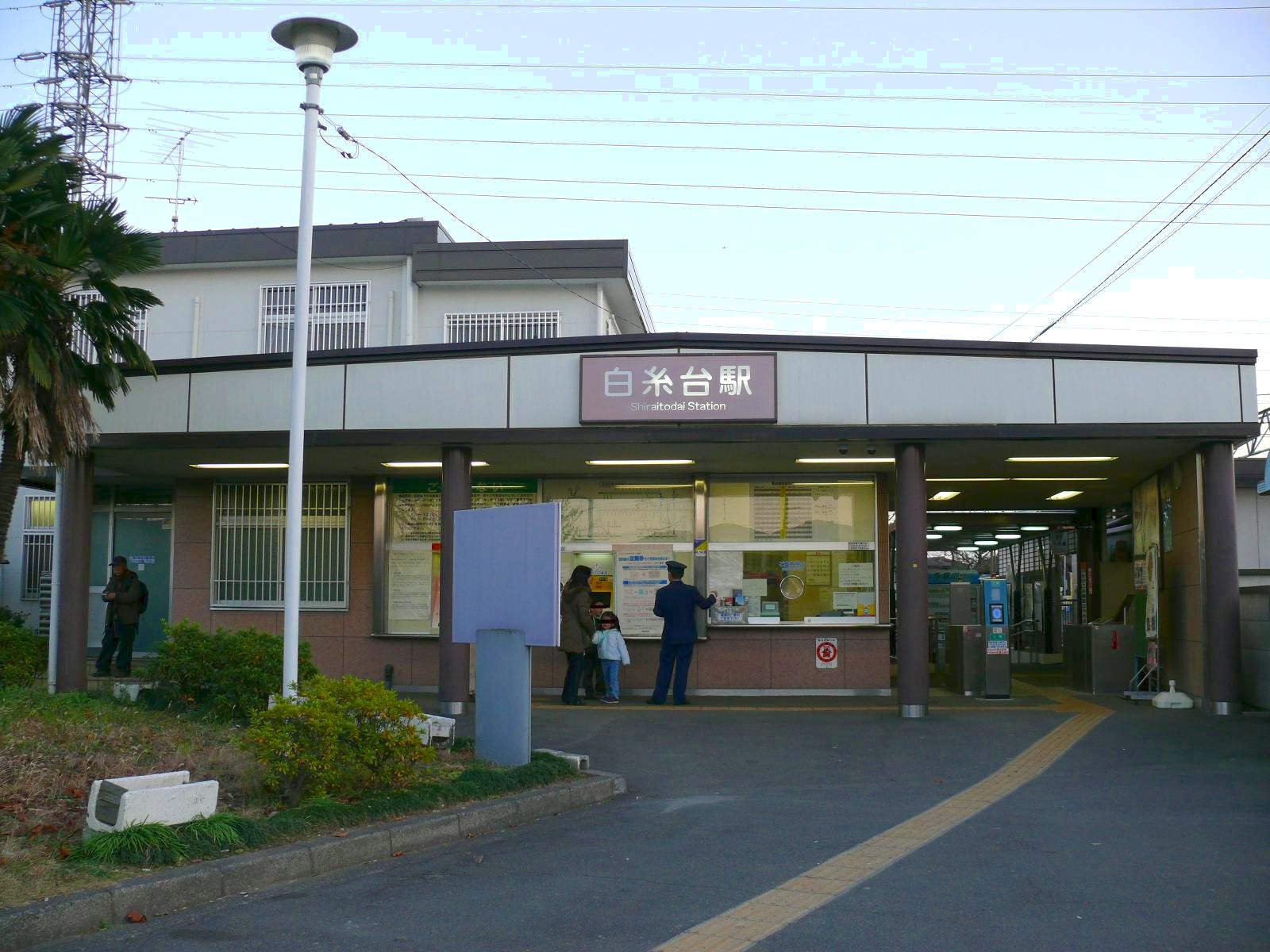
- Shiraitodai Station entrance, 2007

General information
- Location: 2-71-6 Shiraito, Fuchū-shi, Tokyo 183-0011; Japan
- Coordinates: 35.6664°N 139.5100°E
- Operator: Seibu Railway
- Line: Seibu Tamagawa Line
- Distance: 5.5 km from Musashi-Sakai

Other information
- Station code: SW04
- Website: Official website

History
- Opened: October 22, 1917
- Former names: Kita-Tama Station(until 2001)

Passengers
- FY2019: 6,439

Services
Preceding station	Seibu Railway	Following station
Kyōteijōmae SW05 towards Koremasa	Tamagawa Line	Tama SW03 towards Musashi-Sakai
Location
- Location within Tokyo Location within Japan

Shiraitodai Station (白糸台駅, Shiraitodai-eki) is a passenger railway station located in the city of Fuchū, Tokyo, Japan, operated by the private railway operator Seibu Railway.

== Lines ==
Shiraitodai Station is served by the Seibu Tamagawa Line, and is 4.1 kilometers from the terminus of the line at Musashi-Sakai in Tokyo.

== Station layout ==
The station has one ground-level island platform, serving two tracks, connected to the station building by a level crossing.

=== Platforms ===
1	■ Seibu Tamagawa Line	for Musashi-Sakai
2	■ Seibu Tamagawa Line	for Koremasa

== History ==
The station opened on October 22, 1917, as Kita-Tama Station (北多磨駅) and adopted its present name in 2001.

Station numbering was introduced on all Seibu Railway lines during fiscal 2012, with Shiraitodai Station becoming "SW04".

== Passenger statistics ==
In fiscal 2019, the station was the 77th busiest on the Seibu network with an average of 6,439 passengers daily.

The passenger figures for previous years are as shown below.

Fiscal year	Daily average
2005	5,009
2010	5,267
2015	5,863

== Surrounding area ==
- Tama Cemetery
