= Tama Station =

Railway station in Fuchū, Tokyo, Japan

SW03 Tama Station 多磨駅
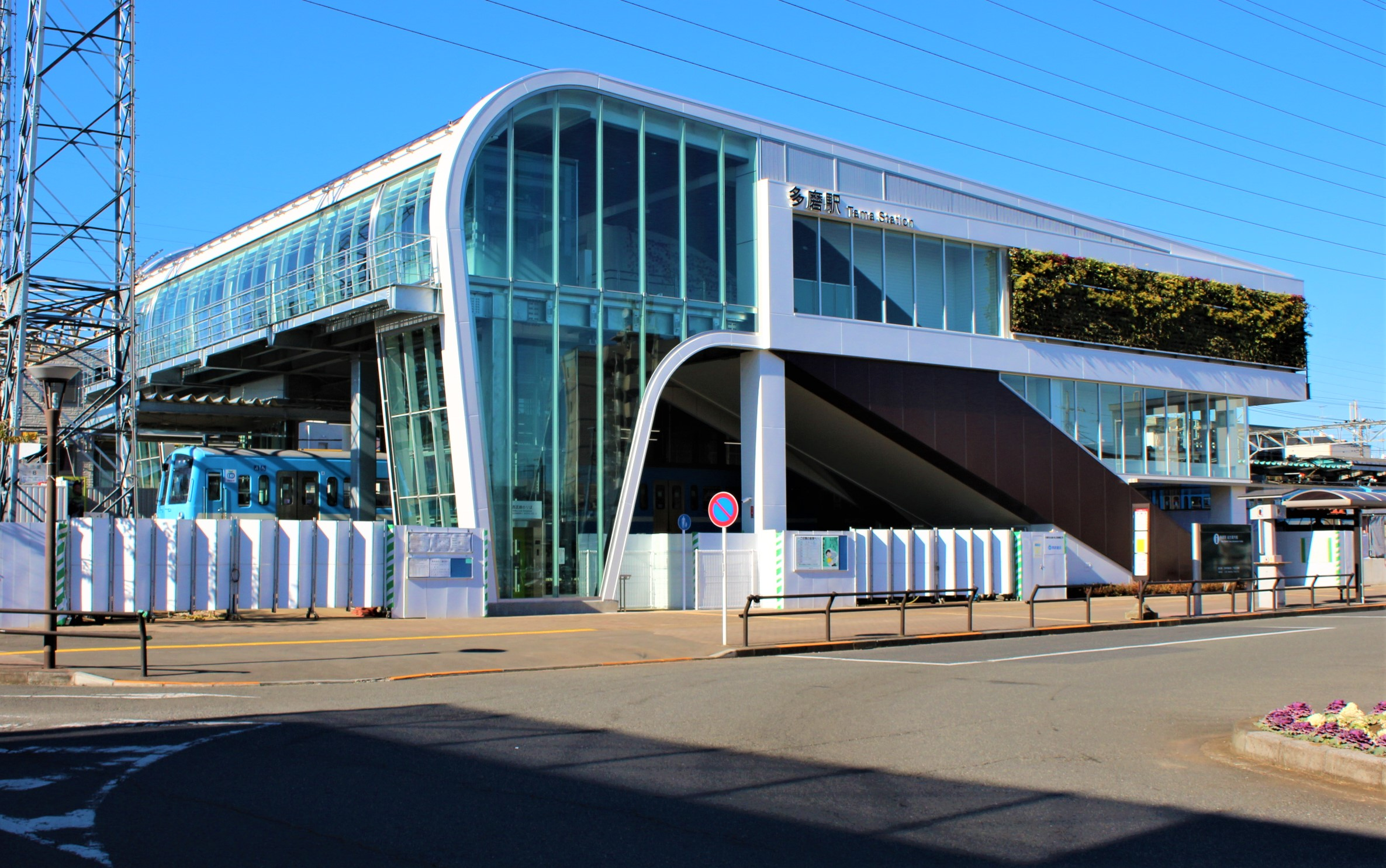
- Tama Station, December 2020

General information
- Location: 3-42-2 Koyogaoka, Fuchū-shi, Tokyo 183-0004; Japan
- Coordinates: 35.6766°N 139.5171°E
- Operator: Seibu Railway
- Line: Seibu Tamagawa Line
- Distance: 4.1 km from Musashi-Sakai
- Platforms: 1 side platforms
- Tracks: 1

Other information
- Station code: SW03
- Website: Official website

History
- Opened: 5 January 1929
- Former names: Tama-Bochi-mae

Passengers
- FY2019: 13,757 daily

Services
Preceding station	Seibu Railway	Following station
Shiraitodai SW04 towards Koremasa	Tamagawa Line	Shin-Koganei SW02 towards Musashi-Sakai
Location
- Location within Tokyo Location within Japan

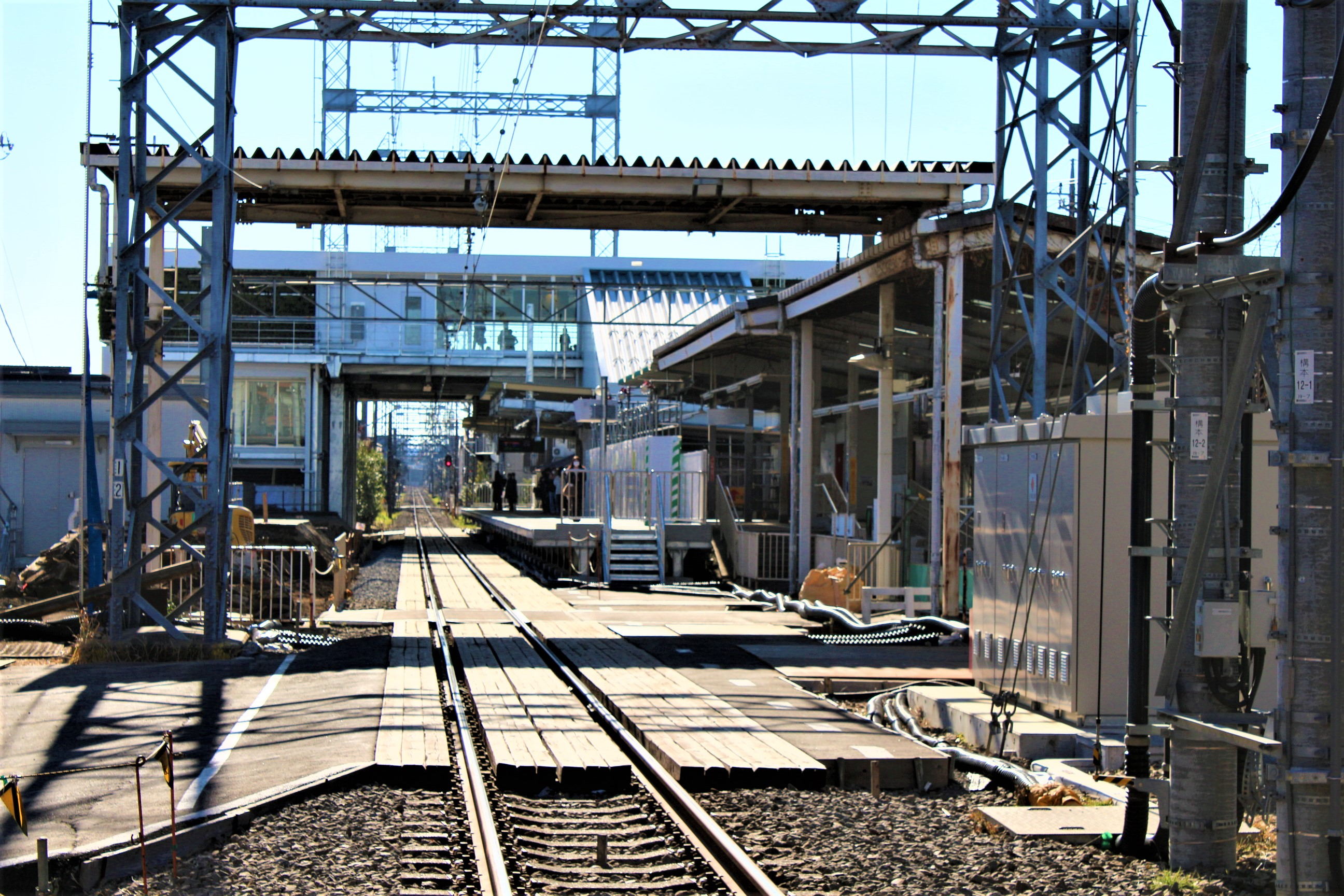
Platforms

Tama Station (多磨駅, Tama-eki) is a passenger railway station located in the city of Fuchū, Tokyo, Japan, operated by the private railway operator Seibu Railway.

== Lines ==
Tama Station is served by the Seibu Tamagawa Line, and is 4.1 kilometers from the starting point of the line at Musashi-Sakai.

== Station layout ==
The station has two side platforms serving two tracks, connected by a level crossing.

=== Platforms ===
1	■ Seibu Tamagawa Line	for Musashi-Sakai
2	■ Seibu Tamagawa Line	for Koremasa

== History ==
The station opened on January 5, 1929, as Tama-Bochi-mae Station (多磨墓地前駅), and was renamed Tama Station in 2001. The station has the secondary name Tōkyō Gaidai-mae (東京外大前).

Station numbering was introduced on all Seibu Railway lines during fiscal 2012, with Tama Station becoming "SW03".

The station underwent significant reforms in 2019 and 2020. The external path between platforms, formerly an underpass, was sibstituted for a state-of-the-art overpass.

== Passenger statistics ==
In fiscal 2019, the station was the 62nd busiest on the Seibu network with an average of 13,757 passengers daily.

The passenger figures for previous years are as shown below.

Fiscal year	Daily average
2005	11,901
2010	12,475
2015	13,807

== Surrounding area ==
- Tama Cemetery
- Tokyo Racecourse
- Tokyo University of Foreign Studies
- National Police Academy
- Ajinomoto Stadium
- American School in Japan

== See also ==
- List of railway stations in Japan
