= Kyōteijō-mae Station =

Railway station in Fuchū, Tokyo, Japan

SW05 Kyōteijō-mae Station 競艇場前駅
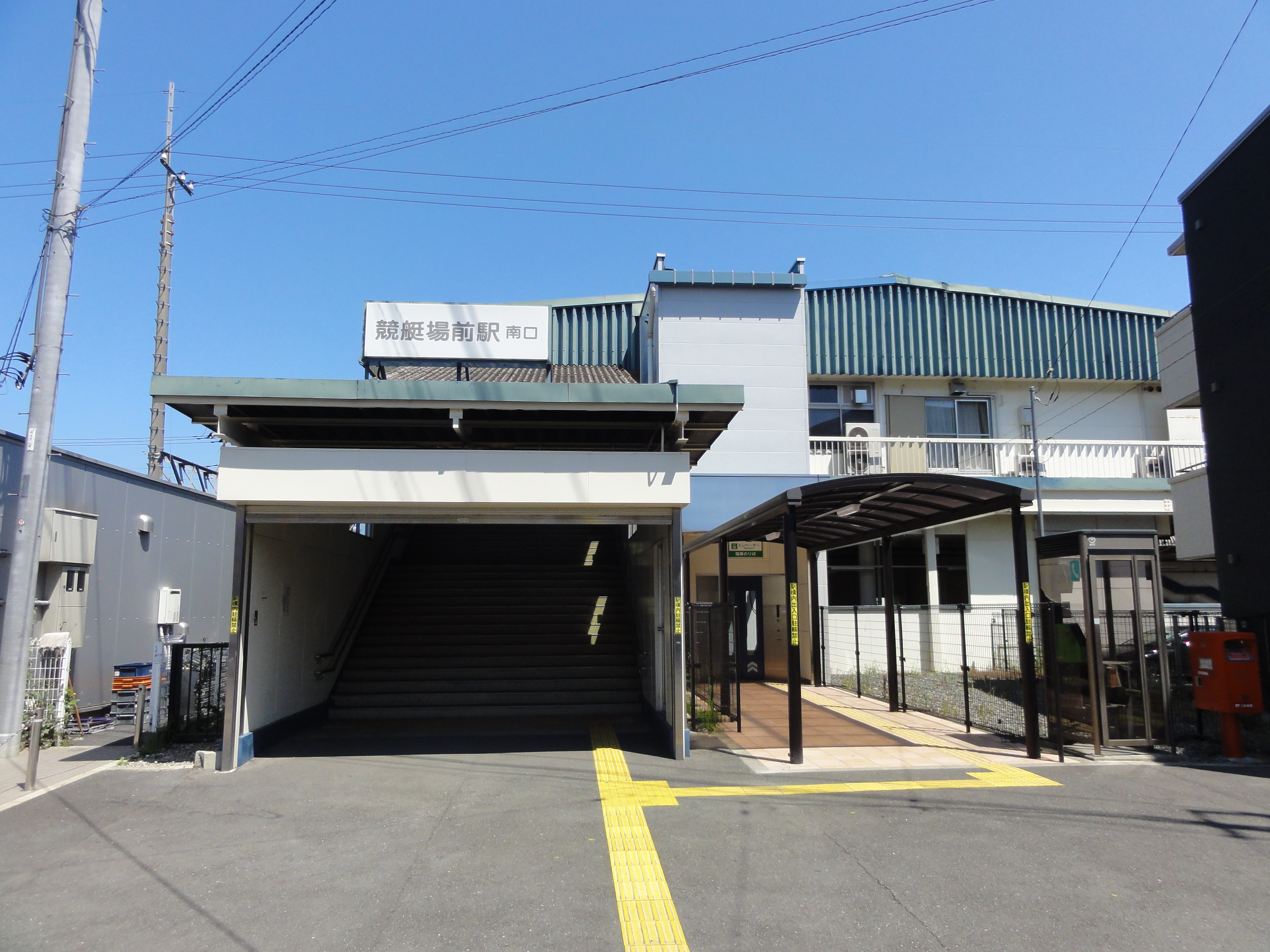
- Kyōteijō-mae Station south entrance, 2012

General information
- Location: 4-10-11 Koyanagi-cho, Fuchū-shi, Tokyo 183-0013; Japan
- Coordinates: 35°39′22″N 139°29′58″E
- Operator: Seibu Railway
- Line: Seibu Tamagawa Line
- Distance: 7.0 km from Musashi-Sakai
- Platforms: 1 side platform

Other information
- Station code: SW05
- Website: Official website

History
- Opened: June 1, 1919
- Former names: Jōkyū (to 1954)

Passengers
- FY2019: 2,924

Services
Preceding station	Seibu Railway	Following station
Koremasa SW06 Terminus	Tamagawa Line	Shiraitodai SW04 towards Musashi-Sakai
Location
- Location within Tokyo Location within Japan

Kyōteijō-mae Station (競艇場前駅, Kyōteijōmae-eki) is a passenger railway station located in the city of Fuchū, Tokyo, Japan, operated by the private railway operator Seibu Railway.

== Lines ==
Kyōteijō-mae Station is served by the Seibu Tamagawa Line, and is 4.1 kilometers from the terminus of the line at Musashi-Sakai in Tokyo.

== Station layout ==
The station has one side platform serving a single bidirectional track.

=== Platforms ===
1	■ Seibu Tamagawa Line	for Musashi-Sakai (Eastbound) for Koremasa (Westbound)

== History ==
The station opened on June 1, 1919, as Jōkyū Station (常久駅) and adopted its present name in 1954.

Station numbering was introduced on all Seibu Railway lines during fiscal 2012, with Kyōteijō-mae Station becoming "SW05".

== Passenger statistics ==
In fiscal 2019, the station was the 82nd busiest on the Seibu network with an average of 2,924 passengers daily.

The passenger figures for previous years are as shown below.

Fiscal year	Daily average
2005	2,845
2010	2,650
2015	2,716

== Surrounding area ==
- Tamagawa Boat Race Stadium
