= Nogawa Park =

Public park in Nomizu, Chōfu, Tokyo, Japan

Coordinates: 35.682372°N 139.524586°E

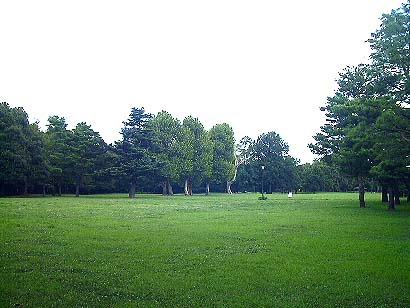
- Interactive map of Nogawa Park
- Type: Public
- Location: Chōfu, Koganei and Mitaka, Tokyo, Japan
- Area: 399,763.78 square meters (98.78378 acres)
- Created: 1 June 1980

Nogawa Park (野川公園, Nogawa kōen) is a public park in Nomizu, Chōfu, Tokyo. It is located at the intersection of Chofu with Koganei and Mitaka, and parts of the park extend to those cities as well.

== History ==
The land for the park was purchased from International Christian University in 1974. It had previously been used as a golf course by the school.

== Geography ==
The park is bordered to the north by International Christian University, and partially surrounds the American School in Japan campus. A pedestrian bridge connects two parts of the park which are separated by Tokyo Metropolitan Route 14.
