= Seibu Tamagawa Line =

Railway line in Tokyo, Japan

Coordinates: 35.68212°N 139.51950°E

Tamagawa Line
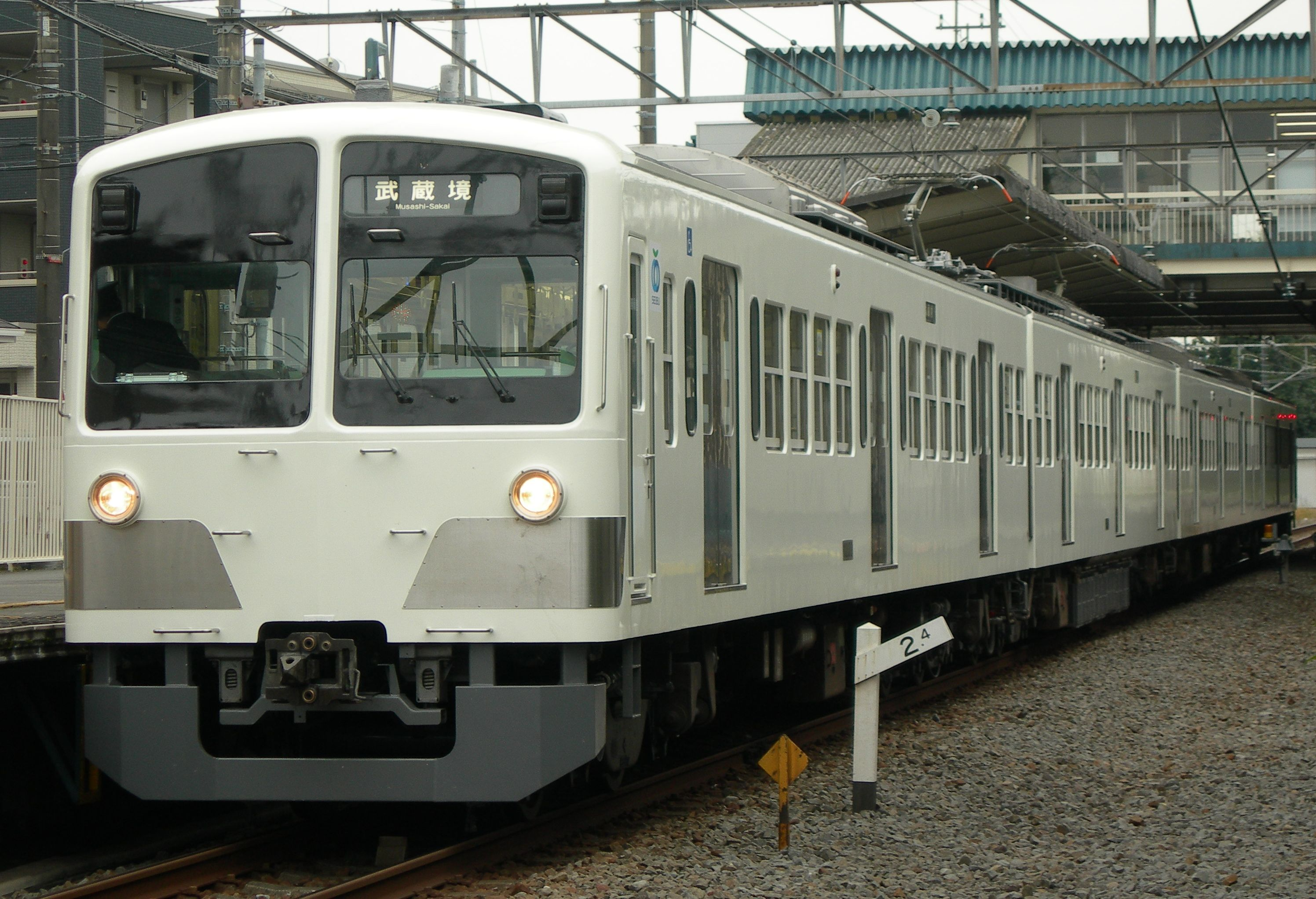
- A Seibu Tamagawa Line train

Overview
- Native name: 多摩川線
- Owner: Seibu Railway
- Line number: SW
- Locale: Tokyo
- Termini: Musashi-Sakai; Koremasa
- Stations: 6

Service
- Type: Commuter rail
- Rolling stock: New 101 series

History
- Opened: 22 October 1917; 108 years ago

Technical
- Line length: 8.0 km (5.0 mi)
- Number of tracks: 1
- Track gauge: 1,067 mm (3 ft 6 in)
- Minimum radius: 300 m
- Electrification: 1,500 V DC, overhead catenary
- Operating speed: 95 km/h (60 mph)

The Tamagawa Line (多摩川線, Seibu Tamagawa-sen) is an 8.0 km (5.0 mi) railway line in the western suburbs of Tokyo operated by the private railway operator Seibu Railway. The line connects Musashi-Sakai Station on the Chūō Main Line with Koremasa Station along the Tama River. The line has only six stations and is not connected to any other part of the Seibu Railway system. The only connection to any other rail line is a rarely used maintenance connection to the JR East Chūō Main Line (just west of Musashi-Sakai Station) that is used to transfer trains requiring inspection or major repairs to Seibu's Musashigaoka Vehicle Inspection and Repair Shop.

The Tamagawa Line is single-track: trains traveling in opposite directions pass each other as necessary at the stations, which are double-track. As of January 2025, during 12-minute frequency trains pass at Shin-Koganei and Shiraitodai, and during 20-minute frequency trains pass at Shiraitodai only.

Although the line is short, it provides access to the Tokyo University of Foreign Studies, the Tokyo Racecourse, the Ajinomoto Stadium, the Tokyo Metropolitan Police Department police school, many cemeteries (including Tokyo's largest, Tama Cemetery), the American School in Japan, and the Tama River.

== Services ==
All services on the Seibu Tamagawa Line are Local trains, stopping at all stations.

As of January 2025, trains operate every 12 minutes between 06:30 and 22:00 every day, and approximately every 20 minutes in the early morning and late at night.

Running time is 12 minutes towards Koremasa and 14 minutes towards Musashi-Sakai.

== Stations ==
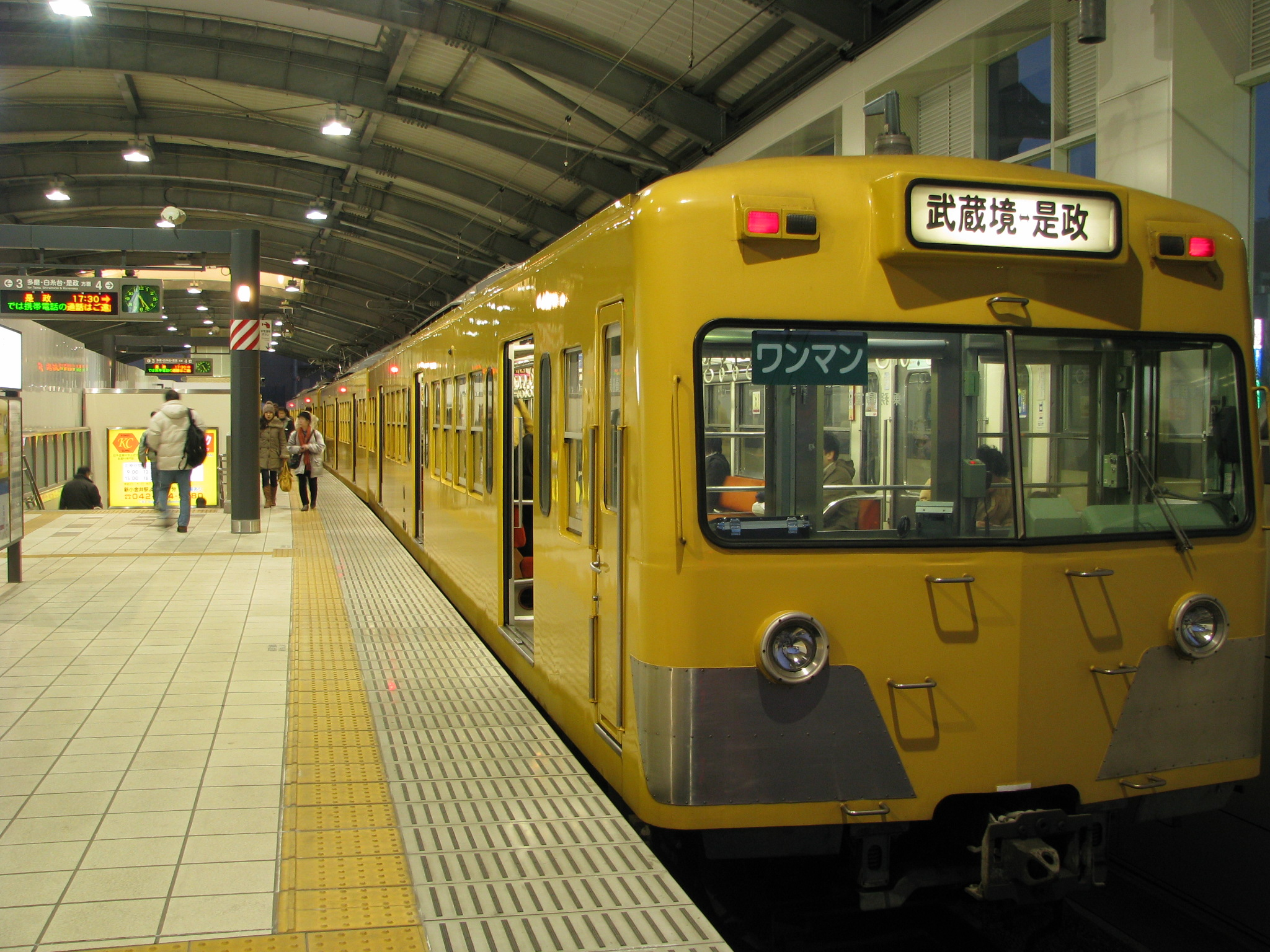
At Musashi-Sakai Station

No.	Station	Japanese	Distance (km)	Transfers		Location	Prefecture
SW01	Musashi-Sakai	武蔵境	0.0	Chūō Line (JC13)	∨	Musashino	Tokyo
SW02	Shin-Koganei	新小金井	1.9		◇	Koganei	Tokyo
SW03	Tama (Tokyo University of Foreign Studies)	多磨 (東京外国語大学)	4.1		｜	Fuchū	Tokyo
SW04	Shiraitodai	白糸台	5.5	Keiō Line (KO21 Musashinodai, KO22 Tama-reien) ‡	◇	Fuchū	Tokyo
SW05	Kyōteijō-mae	競艇場前	7.0		｜	Fuchū	Tokyo
SW06	Koremasa	是政	8.0		｜	Fuchū	Tokyo

‡ Unofficial transfer station. Both Keio Line stations are 600 m (2,000 ft), approximately 8 minute walk from Shiraitodai Station.

== Rolling stock ==
Since March 2010, the line's services are operated exclusively by a fleet of 4 x 4-car New 101 Series trains. These trains are wrapped with different liveries on various occasions. At other times the New 101 Series trains typically operate in a white livery.

The train depot for the Tamagawa Line trains is adjacent to Shiraitodai Station.

=== Liveries ===
==== Izu Hakone Color ====
To commemorate the 100th anniversary of the opening of the Tamagawa Line from 2017 to 2018, which coincided with the 100th anniversary of the Izu Hakone Railway, the two lines celebrated by adopting each other's liveries.

==== Akaden painting ====
By request from a questionnaire at the 100th-anniversary event of the Tamagawa Line, from January 24, 2018, Seibu Railway's old livery "Akaden Paint" (red x beige) was used.

==== Two-tone color ====
From April 18, 2018, the trains were repainted with the two-tone color of yellow & beige. The paint color is derived from the livery that was used during the time of the debut of the New 101 series train. The livery was also used before the fleet renewal of 2010, as the Old 101 Series train was featured in the same livery. This livery was the most requested after Akaden painting in the questionnaire at the 100th-anniversary event of Tamagawa Line.

==== Ohmi Railway Color (1251 formation) ====
From July 11, 2018, To commemorate the 120th anniversary of the Ohmi Railway and the 100th anniversary of the Tamagawa Line a wrapping featuring the "Mizuumifugo" (light blue) livery was introduced.

=== Former Rolling Stock ===
Before the New 101 series, the line's services were operated by the Old 101 series (also referred to as Original 101 series), which were in use from 1996 to 2010. These trains originally were introduced as "One-Man" (ワンマン) services. Prior to the One-Man train service on the New 101 Series, the following trains were also used: 401 series & Seibu 701 series, which had been transferred from the Shinjuku line system to the Tamagawa line, and the Seibu 451 series, Seibu 551 series, & Seibu 571 series, which were called Akaden trains due to their red and beige livery.

== History ==
The first section of the line, between Musashi-Sakai and Kita-Tama Station (present-day Shiraitodai Station), opened on 22 October 1917. The line was extended to Koremasa on 20 June 1922. In 1927, the company was absorbed by the Seibu Railway. The entire line was electrified in 1950. Freight operations ceased in 1967.

== Photo gallery ==
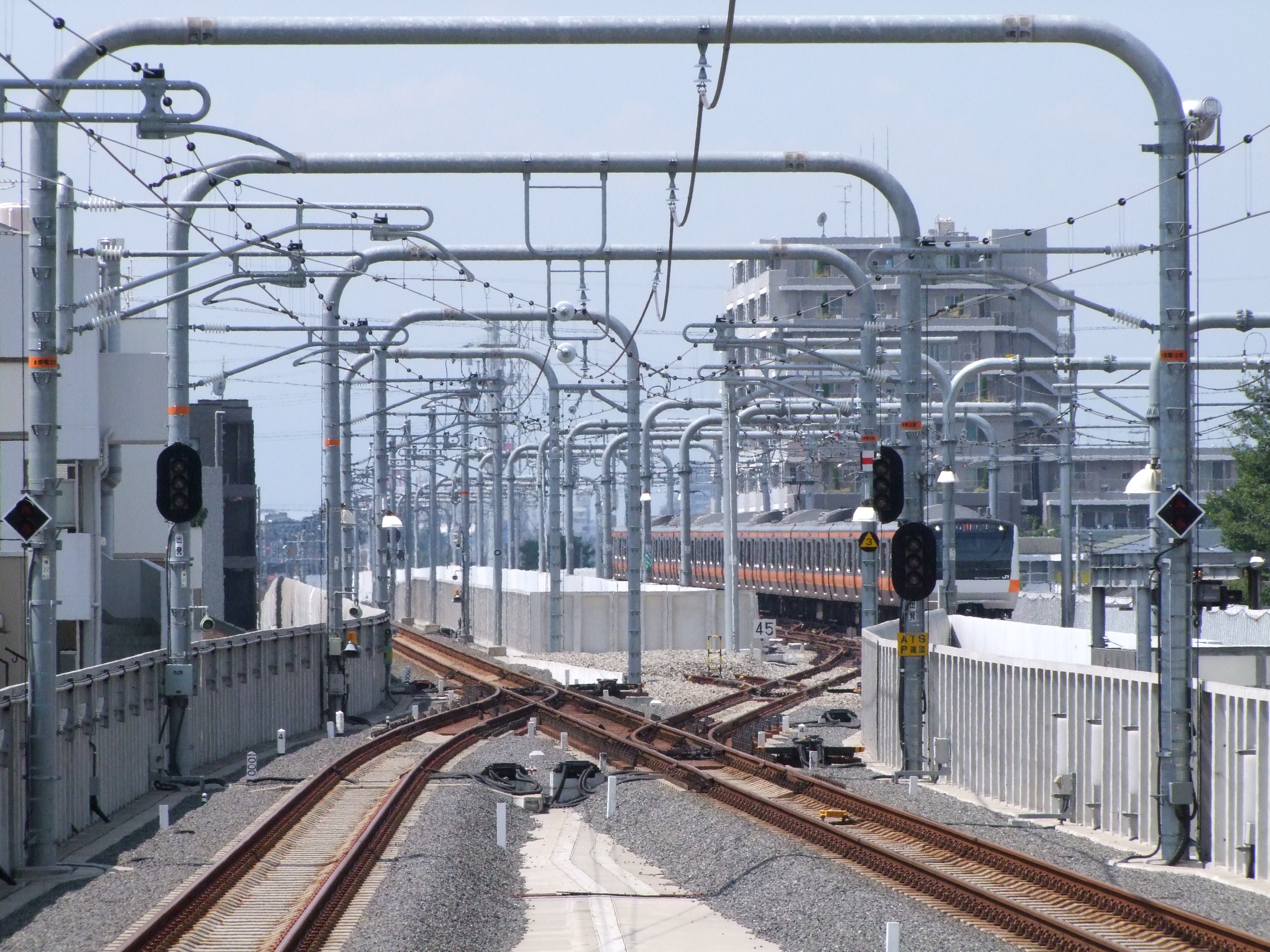
Track arrangement at Musashi-Sakai Station. Shows connecting track to JR East Chuo Main Line

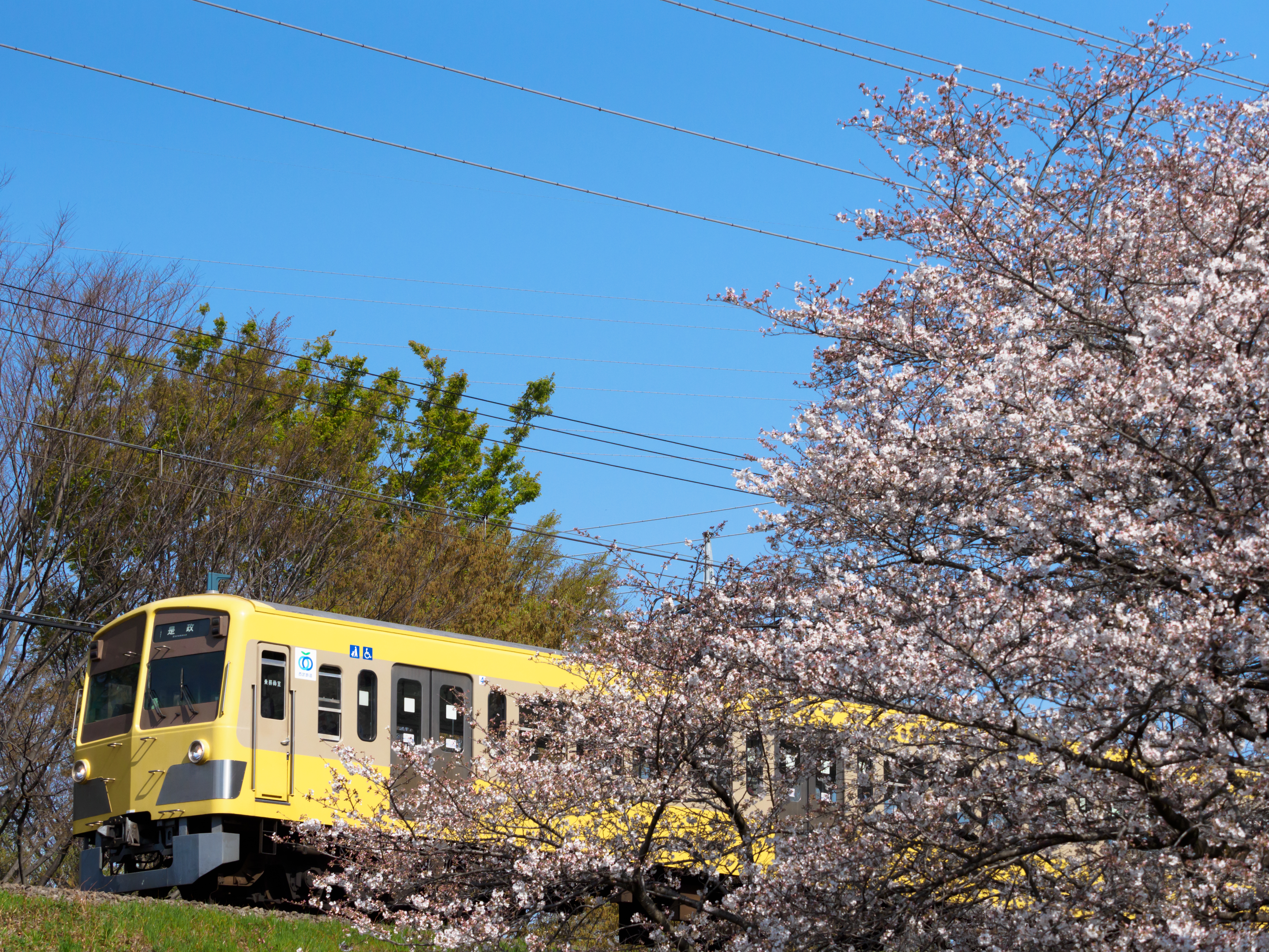
Cherry blossoms on Seibu Tamagawa Line at Nogawa

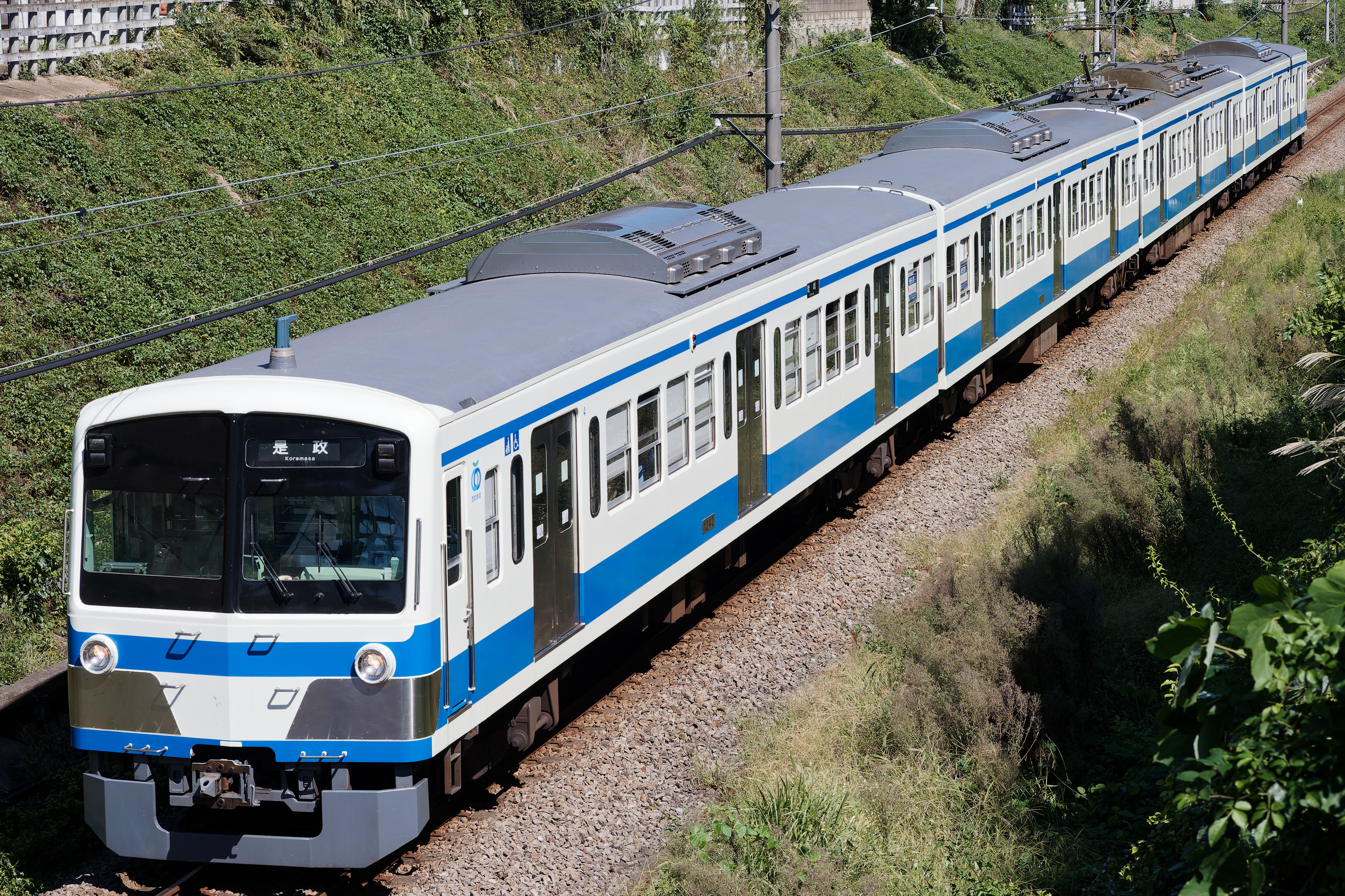
Seibu 101 Series 241F

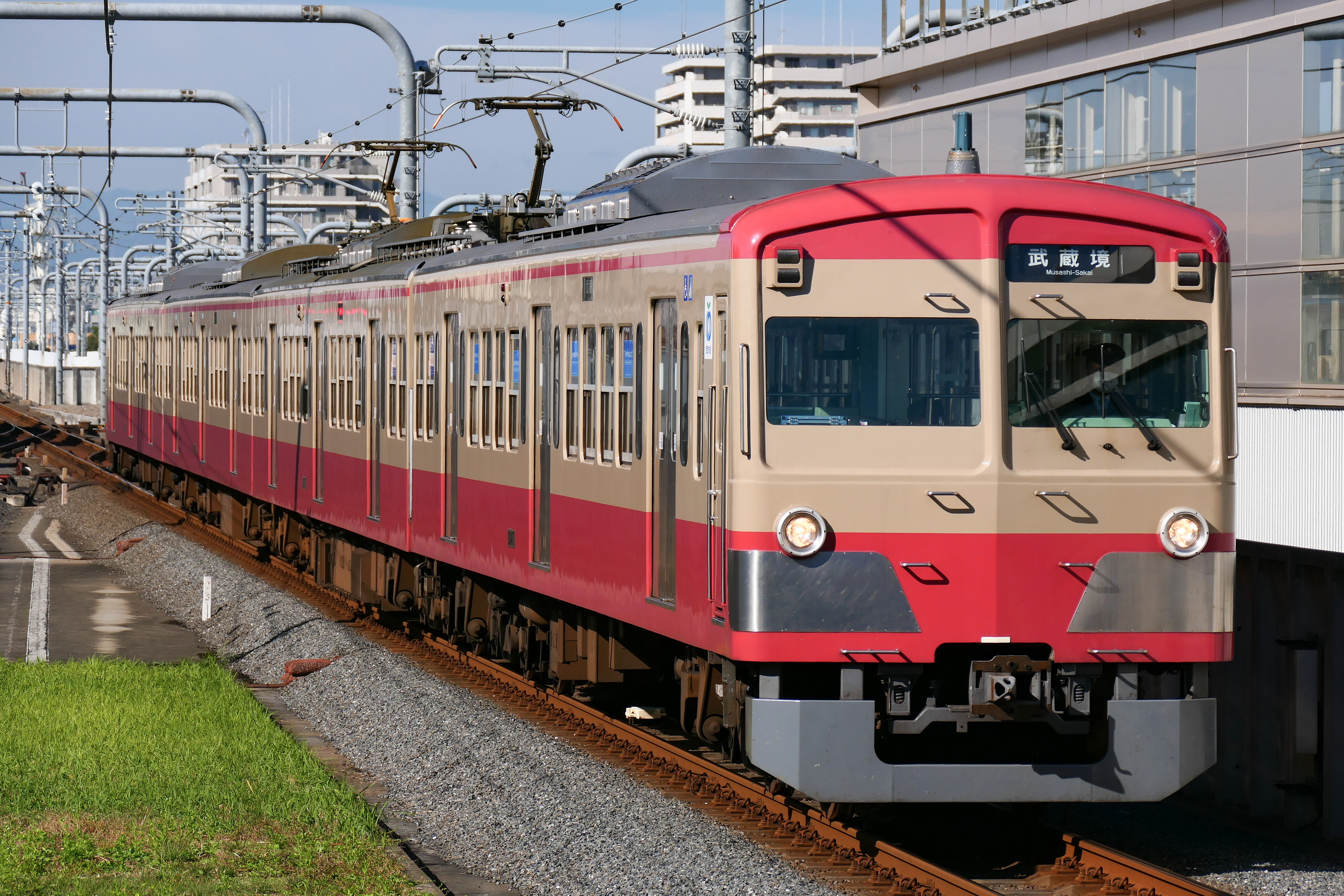
Seibu 101 Series 1247F

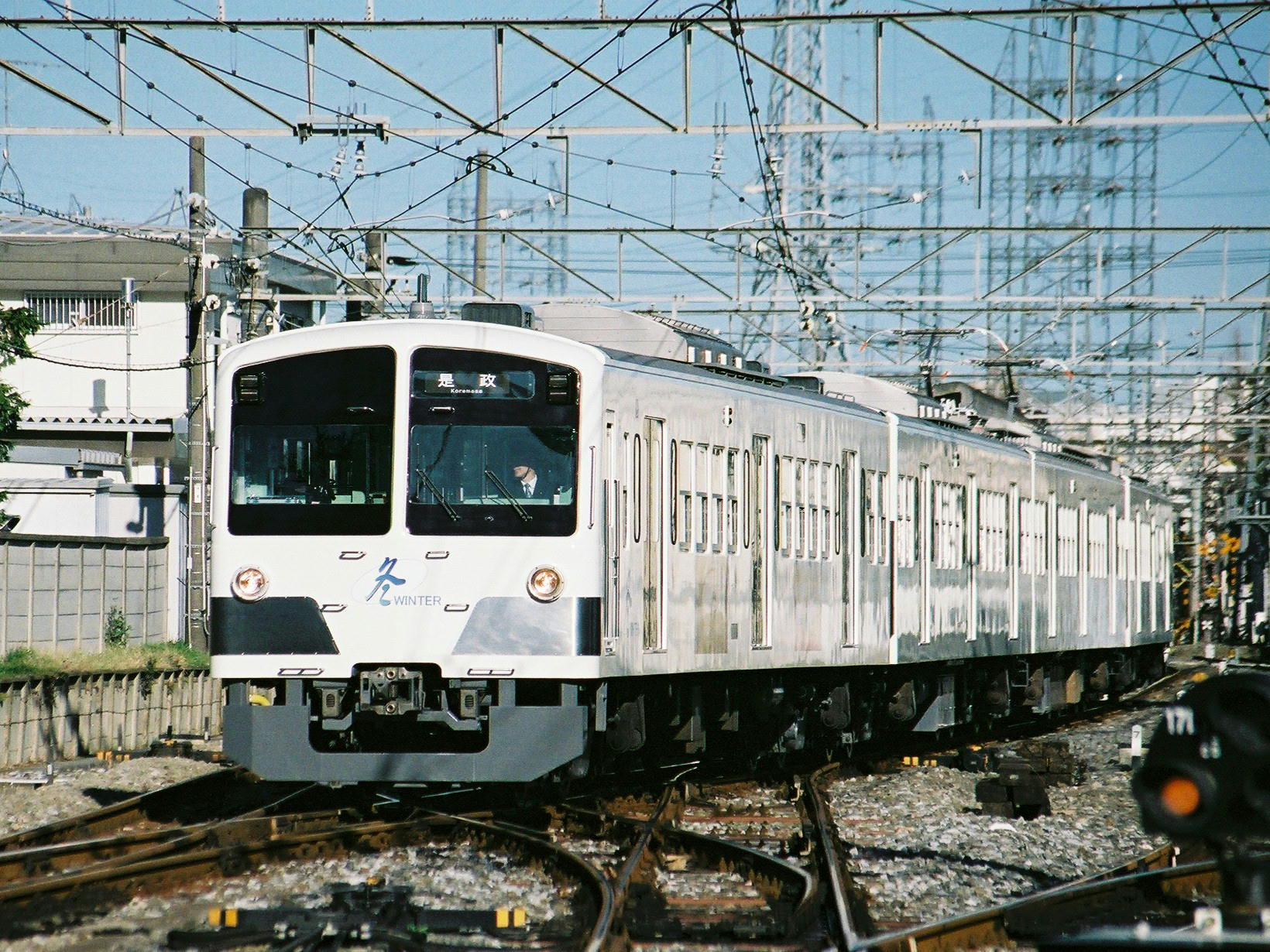
Seibu 101 series 1254
