= Ajinomoto Stadium =

Stadium located in Tokyo, Japan

Coordinates: 35°39′51″N 139°31′38″E

Tokyo Stadium Ajinomoto Stadium
- Ajisuta
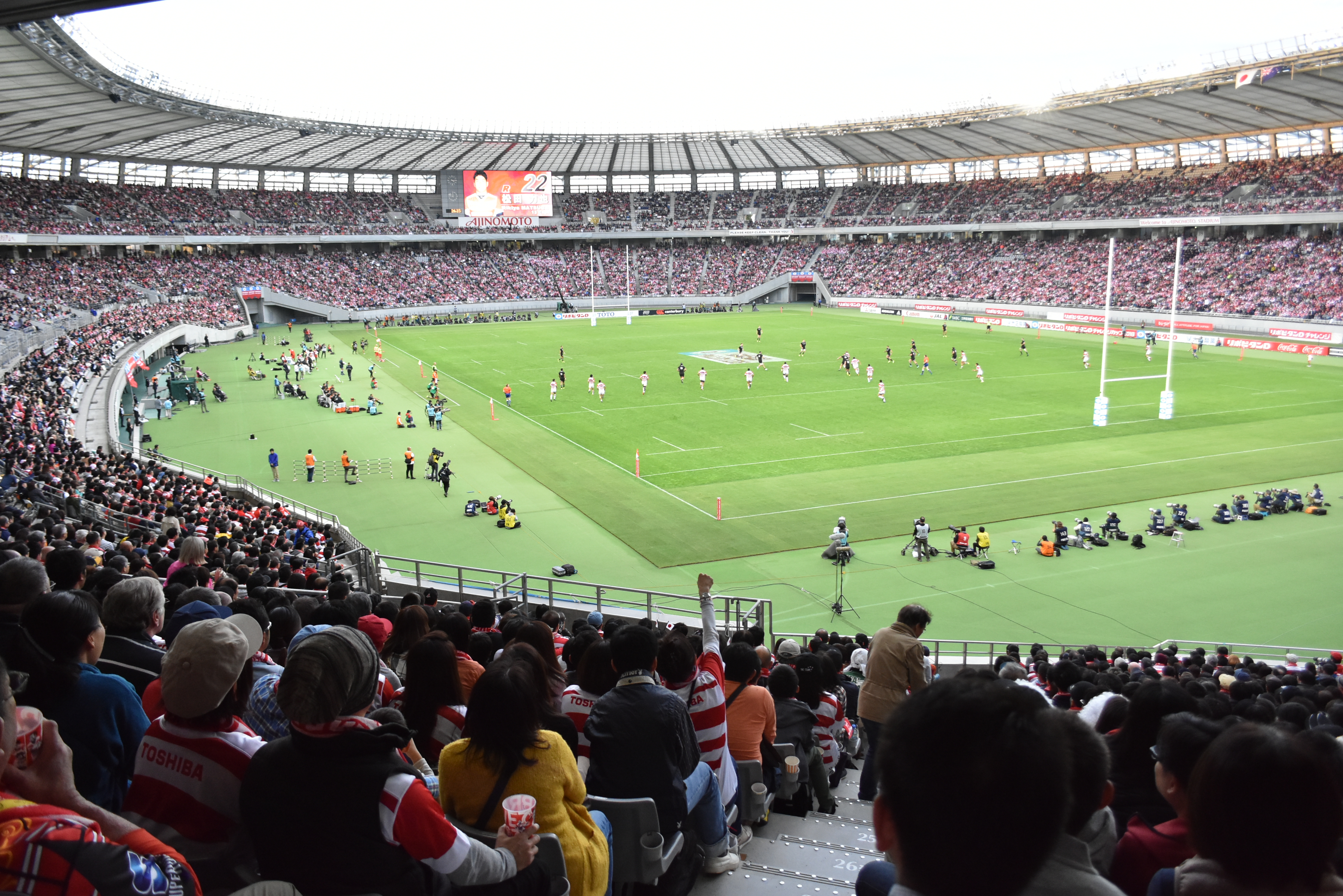
- Interactive map of Tokyo Stadium; Ajinomoto Stadium
- Location: Chōfu, Tokyo, Japan
- Owner: Tokyo Municipal Government
- Operator: Tokyo Stadium Co., Ltd.
- Capacity: 49,970
- Surface: Grass
- Field size: 110.5 m x 75.4 m
- Public transit: Keio Line at Tobitakyū; Seibu Tamagawa Line at Tama

Construction
- Opened: 10 March 2001

Tenants
- FC Tokyo (2001–present); Tokyo Verdy; Toshiba Brave Lupus Tokyo; Tokyo Sungoliath; Japan national football team; Japan national rugby union team

The Tokyo Stadium (東京スタジアム, Tōkyō Sutajiamu), currently known as Ajinomoto Stadium (味の素スタジアム, Ajinomoto Sutajiamu; or simply Ajisuta) for sponsorship reasons, is a multi-purpose stadium in Chōfu, Tokyo, Japan. The stadium was founded at Kantō Mura, the redevelopment area formerly used by United States Forces Japan, in March 2001.

It was the first stadium in Japan that sold its naming rights, which went to Ajinomoto Co., Inc. on a five-year, 1.2 billion yen (about 10 million U.S. dollars) contract from March 2003 to February 2008 to name it Ajinomoto Stadium. This contract has been renewed four times, the last one extended for five years from March 2024 to the end of February, 2029, for 1.05 billion yen.

== Overview ==
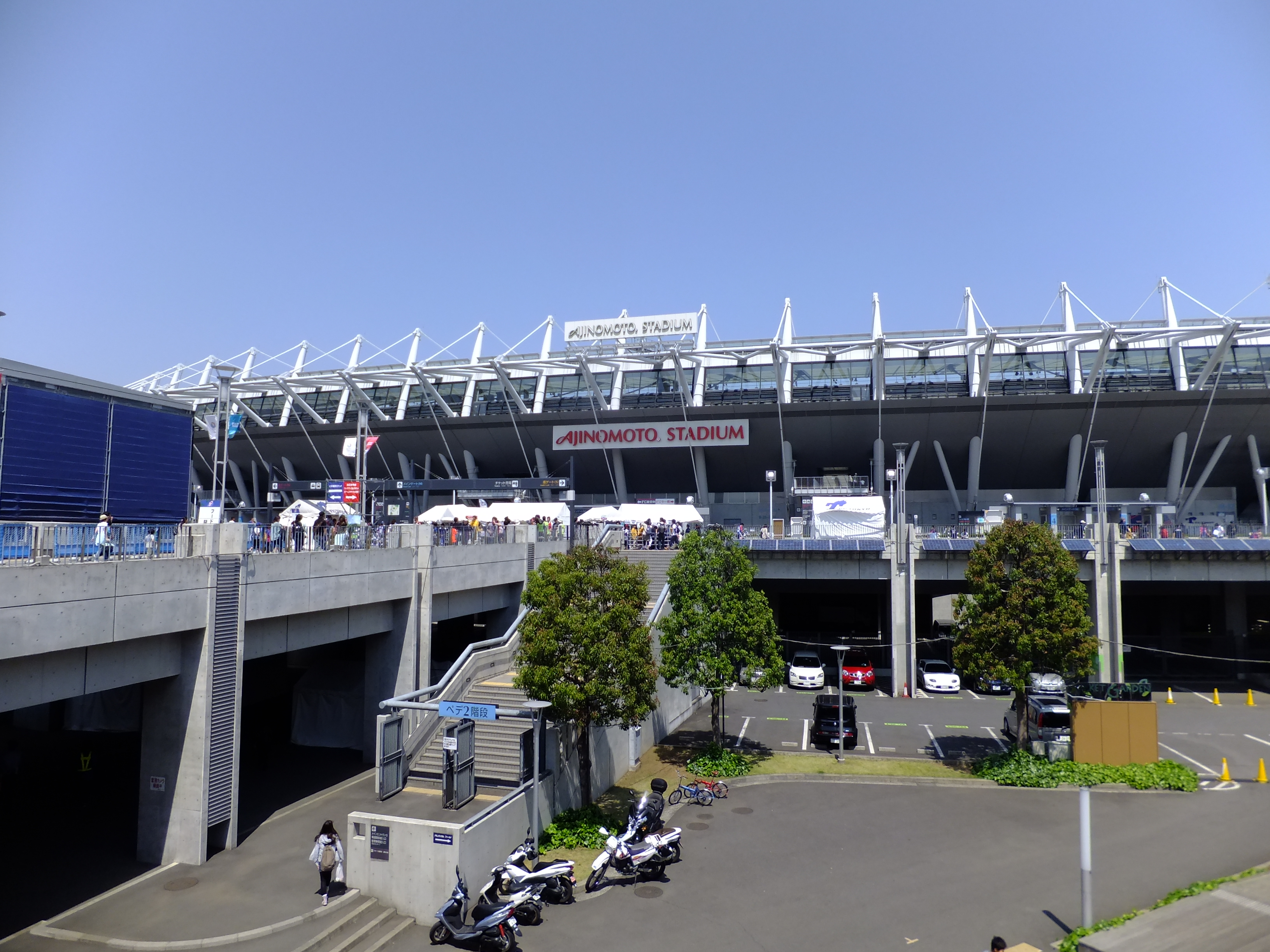
Stadium exterior

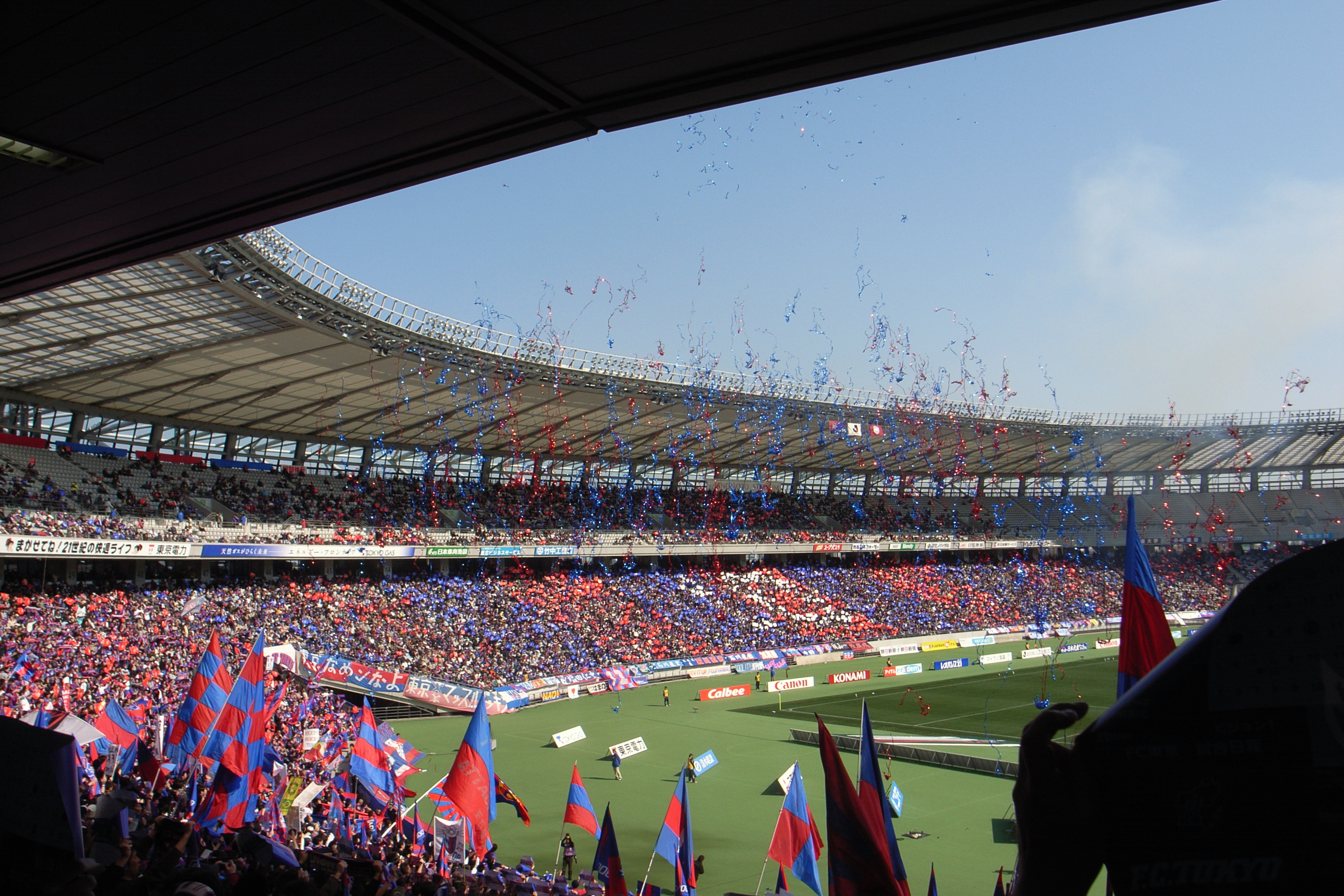
FC Tokyo supporters

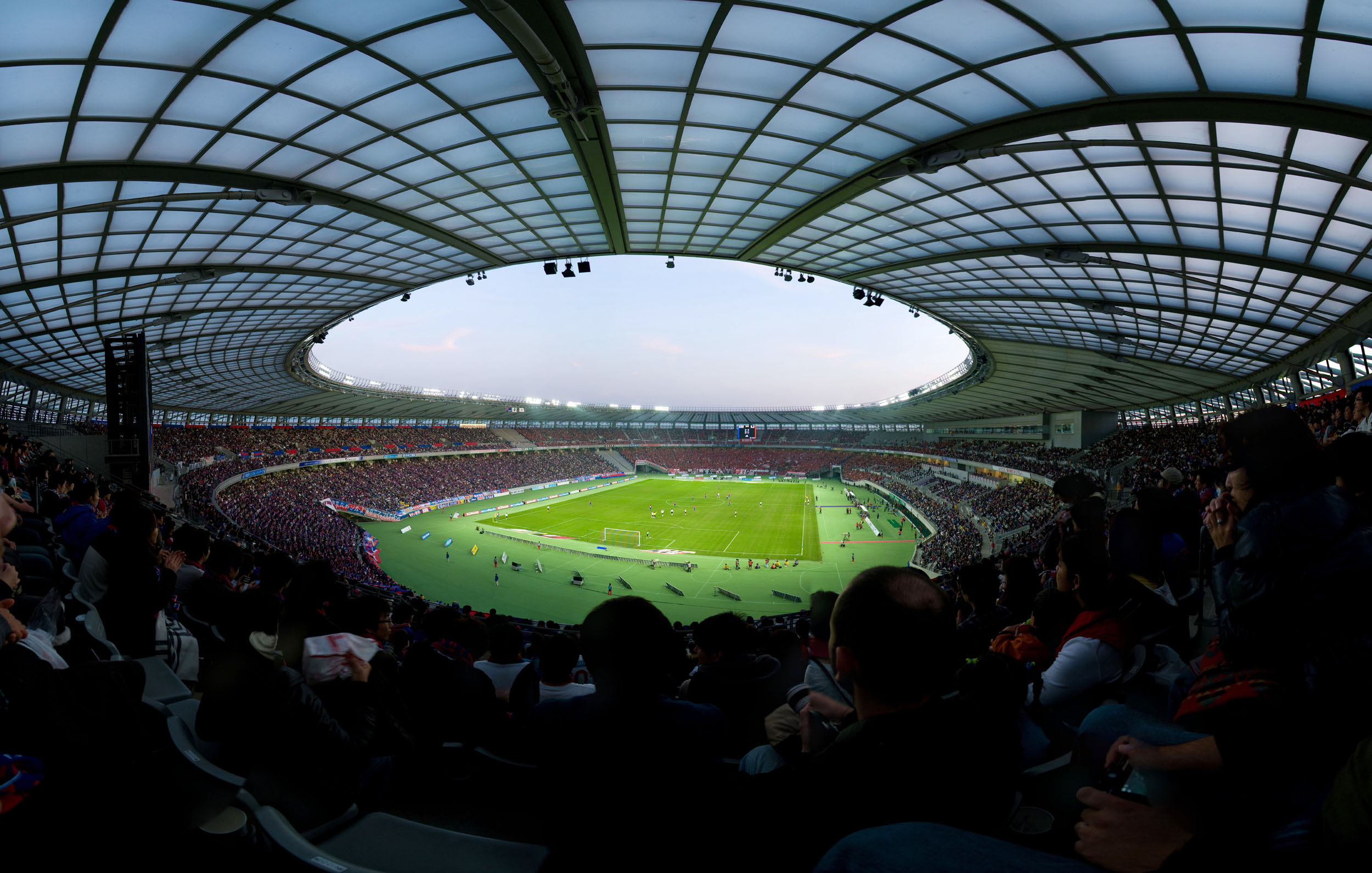
Ajinomoto Stadium panorama

The stadium is the home of J1 League football clubs FC Tokyo and Tokyo Verdy and is used as the venue of some lower divisions of football leagues. Rugby union games are also held there. For the 2002 FIFA World Cup, Saudi Arabia's national team based their training camp at Chōfu and used the stadium as a main training ground, although it did not host an actual World Cup match.

The stadium is often used for non-sport events, such as concerts and flea markets. It has been used as a shelter for survivors of the 2011 Tōhoku earthquake and tsunami. The stadium was the rugby venue for the 2020 Summer Olympics. During the Olympics, the stadium was known as Tokyo Stadium due to International Olympic Committee's non-commercialization policy. The stadium has also been one of the venues for 2019 Rugby World Cup and hosted the opening ceremony, followed by the opening match of the tournament, as well as other 7 matches including Bronze Final.

=== Site ===
The north end of the stadium adjoins the Chofu Airport, while Route 20 runs close to the south end. At the south end is the main gate, which is directly connected by a pedestrian bridge over Route 20.

=== Stand ===
The stand accommodates 49,970 and is divided into two levels; the upper level accommodates 20,600 and the lower level 29,370 (both are all-seated). On each level, the stand is divided into four sections (main, back, north and south sides).

The whole of the upper level, as well as upper tiers of the lower level, is covered by roof, which is made of Teflon (main and back) and polycarbonate (both sides). The main stand houses media and hospitality boxes, VIP rooms and reception hall. Two large LED displays are installed at both sides.

=== Ground ===
The ground was originally designed for both athletics and football games. However, the construction of the supplementary ground, which is needed for compliance with 1st-grade athletic grounds in Japan, has been postponed. The management company has decided to use the ground mainly for football, and not to install a running track until the supplementary pitch has been added. Currently artificial turf is laid down all over the ground except the football field area, over which natural turf is spread. Consequently, there is some room between the football pitch and the stand.

In 2013, the athletics track was finally installed in order to host the National Sports Festival of Japan at the same year. However, the artificial turf is still used over the track for football matches.

In order to comply with height limitation close to the airport, the pitch is sunk below the level of the land around the stadium.

== 2019 Rugby World Cup ==
Date	Time (JST)	Team #1	Res.	Team #2	Round	Attendance
20 September 2019	19:45	Japan	30–10	Russia	Pool A (opening match)	45,745
21 September 2019	16:15	France	23–21	Argentina	Pool C	40,004
29 September 2019	16:45	Australia	25–29	Wales	Pool D	47,885
5 October 2019	17:00	England	39–10	Argentina	Pool C	48,185
6 October 2019	13:45	New Zealand	71–9	Namibia	Pool B	48,354
19 October 2019	19:15	New Zealand	46–14	Ireland	Quarter Final	46,686
20 October 2019	19:15	Japan	3–26	South Africa	Quarter Final	48,831
1 November 2019	18:00	New Zealand	40–17	Wales	Bronze Final	48,842

== Football at the Olympic Games ==
Men's Tournament

Date	Time (JST)	Team #1	Res.	Team #2	Round	Attendance
22 July 2021	17.00	Mexico	4–1	France	Group A	0
22 July 2021	20.00	Japan	1–0	South Africa	Group A	0

Women's Tournament

Date	Time (JST)	Team #1	Res.	Team #2	Round	Attendance
21 July 2021	17.30	Sweden	3–0	United States	Group G	0
21 July 2021	20.30	Australia	2–1	New Zealand	Group G	0

== Access ==
- Keiō Line: 5 minutes' walk from Tobitakyū
- Seibu Tamagawa Line: 20 minutes' walk from Tama
