= Higashi-Koganei Station =

Railway station in Koganei, Tokyo, Japan

Coordinates: 35°42′06″N 139°31′29″E

JC14 Higashi-Koganei Station 東小金井駅
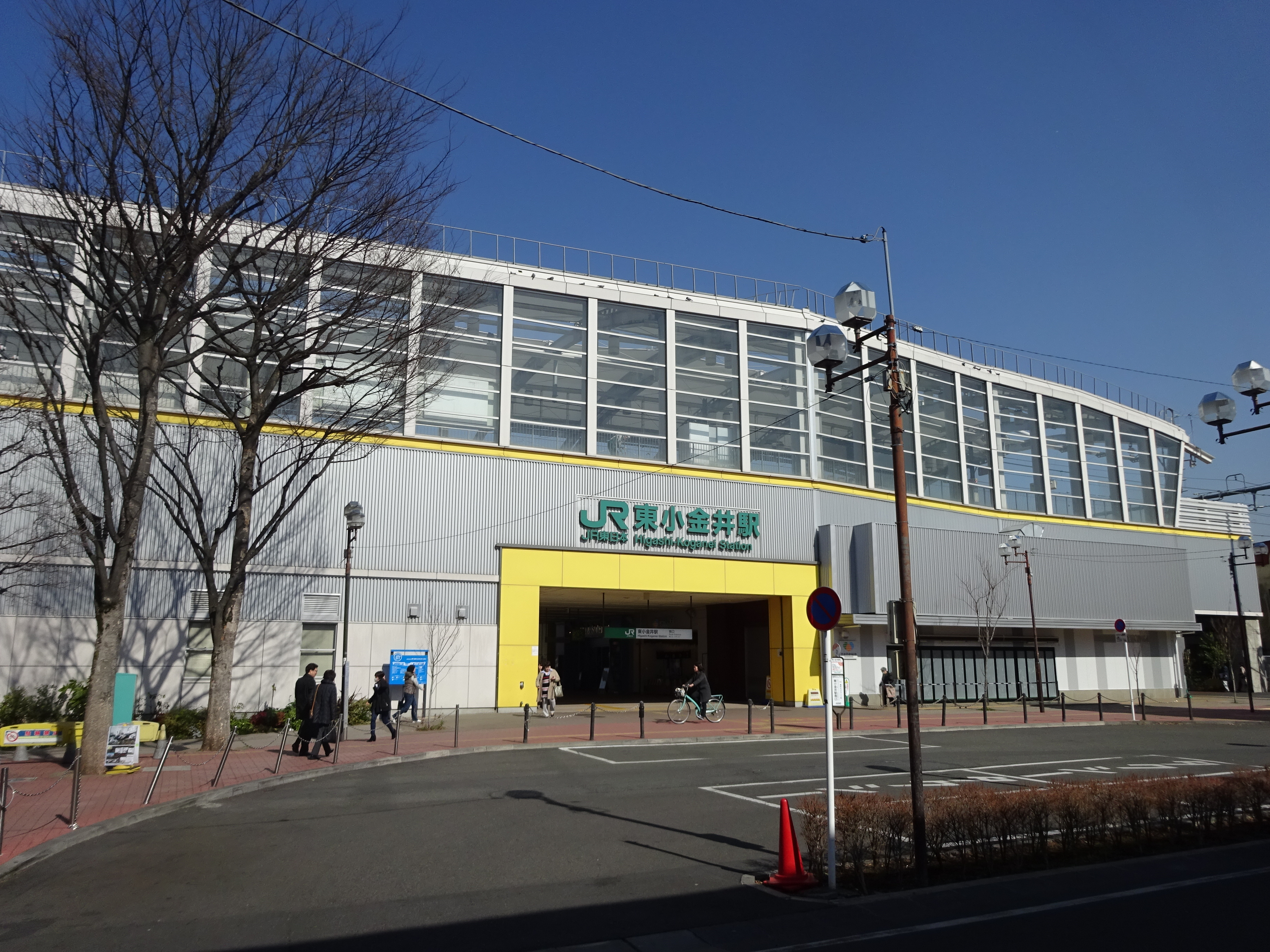
- The south entrance in February 2016

General information
- Location: 5-1-1 Kajino-cho, Koganei-shi, Tokyo 184-0002; Japan
- Operator: JR East
- Line: ■ Chuo Line (Rapid)
- Distance: 27.4 km from Tokyo
- Platforms: 1 side + 1 island platform
- Tracks: 3

Other information
- Status: Staffed (Midori no Madoguchi)
- Station code: JC14
- Website: Official website

History
- Opened: 10 September 1964

Passengers
- FY2024: 59,298 (daily)

Services
Preceding station	JR East	Following station
Musashi-Koganei JC15 towards Ōtsuki	Chūō Line Rapid	Musashi-Sakai JC13 towards Tokyo
Location
- Location within Tokyo Location within Japan

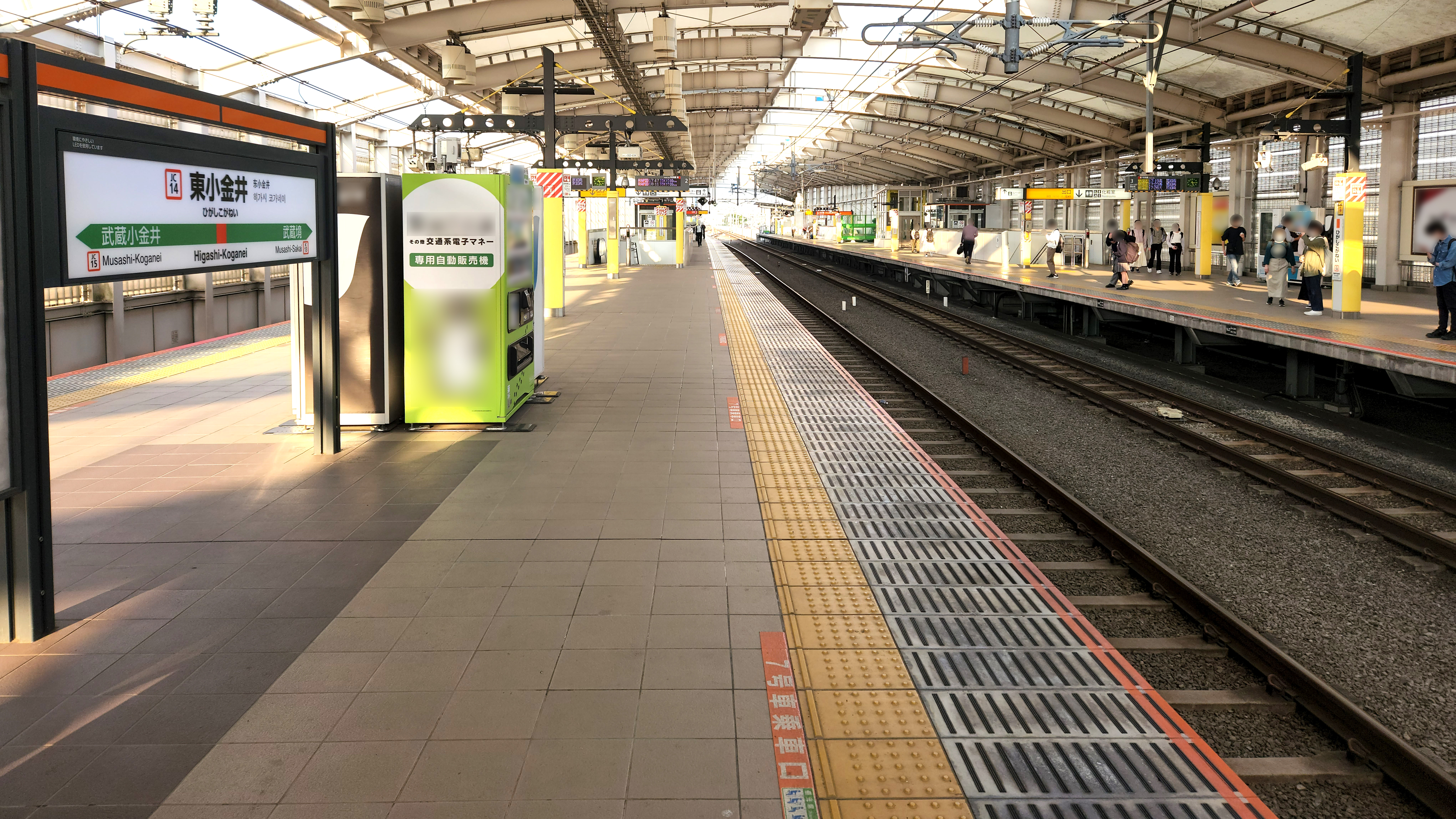
The station platforms in May 2022

Higashi-Koganei Station (東小金井駅, Higashi-Koganei-eki) is a passenger railway station located in the city of Koganei, Tokyo, Japan, operated by East Japan Railway Company (JR East).

== Lines ==
Higashi-Koganei Station is served by the Chuo Line (Rapid) Service. It is 27.4 kilometers from the starting point of the line at Tokyo.

== Station layout ==
The station has one elevated side platform and one elevated island platform serving three tracks, with the station building located underneath. The station had a Midori no Madoguchi staffed ticket office.

=== Platforms ===
1	Chūō Line (Rapid)	for Shinjuku and Tokyo
2	Chūō Line (Rapid)	(for trains bound for both directions)
3	Chūō Line (Rapid)	for Tachikawa, Hachiōji and Takao

== History ==
The station opened on September 10, 1964. Freight operations from the station began from April 1965, and continued until 1984. The station became part of the JR East network after the privatization of Japanese National Railways (JNR) on April 1, 1987.

== Passenger statistics ==
In fiscal 2019, the station was used by an average of 31,758 passengers daily (boarding passengers only). The passenger figures for previous years are as shown below.

Fiscal year	Daily average
2000	26,710
2005	28,130
2010	27,821
2015	30,039

== Surrounding area ==
- Tokyo University of Agriculture and Technology
- Hosei University
- Asia University
- International Christian University
- Japan Lutheran College
- Tokyo Union Theological Seminary
- Tokyo University of Electro-Communications
- Studio Ghibli (animation company)
- Gainax (animation company)
- Feel (animation company)
- Koganei Park
- Edo-Tokyo Open Air Architectural Museum

== See also ==
- List of railway stations in Japan
