= Seibu 401 series =

Electric multiple unit of the Seibu Railway

Seibu 401/411 series
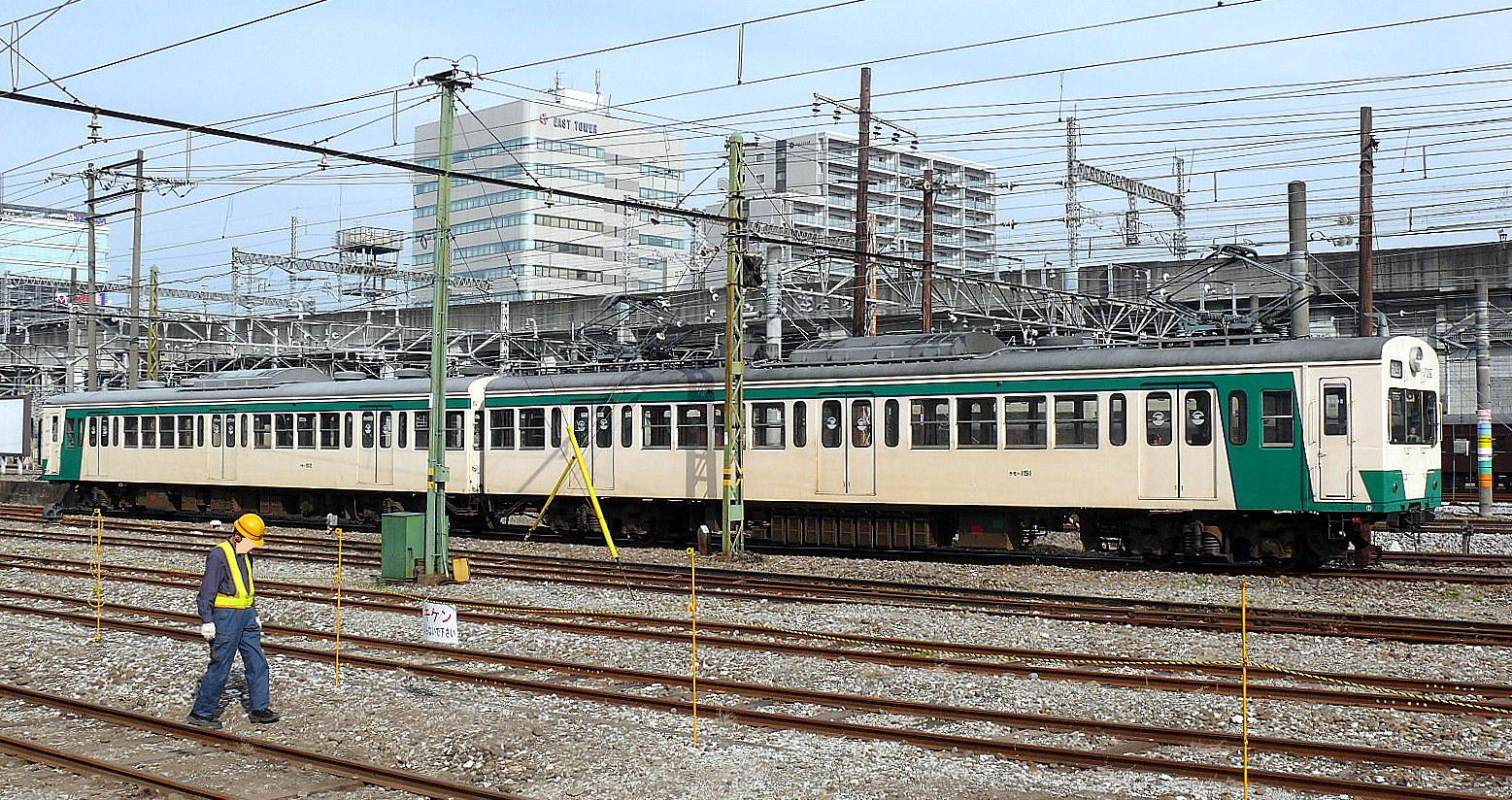
- A Jōshin 150 series train converted from Seibu 401 series
- In service: Seibu Railway; 1968–1997; Jōshin Electric Railway; 1992–2019; Ohmi Railway; 1997–present (820 series); 1998–present (800 series); 1998–2019 (700 series)
- Manufacturer: Seibu Tokorozawa Railway Works
- Entered service: 1968 (Seibu Railway as 411 series); 1990 (Sangi Railway); 1992 (Jōshin Dentetsu Jōshin Line); 1997 (Ohmi Railway 820 series); 1998 (Ohmi Railway 700 and 800 series)
- Refurbished: 1978
- Number built: 38 cars
- Number scrapped: 2 cars (Ohmi Railway 700 series)
- Successor: Jōshin 700 series
- Formation: 2 cars per trainset
- Operators: Seibu Railway; Sangi Railway; Jōshin Electric Railway; Ohmi Railway
- Lines served: Seibu Shinjuku Line, Seibu Tamagawa Line, Sangi Line, Jōshin Dentetsu Jōshin Line

Specifications
- Car body construction: Steel
- Car length: 20 m (65 ft 7 in)
- Doors: 3 pairs per side
- Maximum speed: 100 km/h (62 mph)
- Traction system: Resistor control
- Traction motors: 411 series: MT15E; 401 series: HS-836-Frb; HS-836-Krb; TDK-8090-A
- Power output: 120kW
- Electric system(s): 1,500 V DC overhead catenary
- Current collection: Pantograph
- Safety system(s): Seibu ATS
- Multiple working: All Seibu 3-door trains
- Track gauge: 1,067 mm (3 ft 6 in)

The Seibu 401 series (西武401系) is an electric multiple unit (EMU) train type operated by the private railway operator Seibu Railway on commuter services in the Tokyo area of Japan from 1978 to 1997.

== Seibu Railway ==
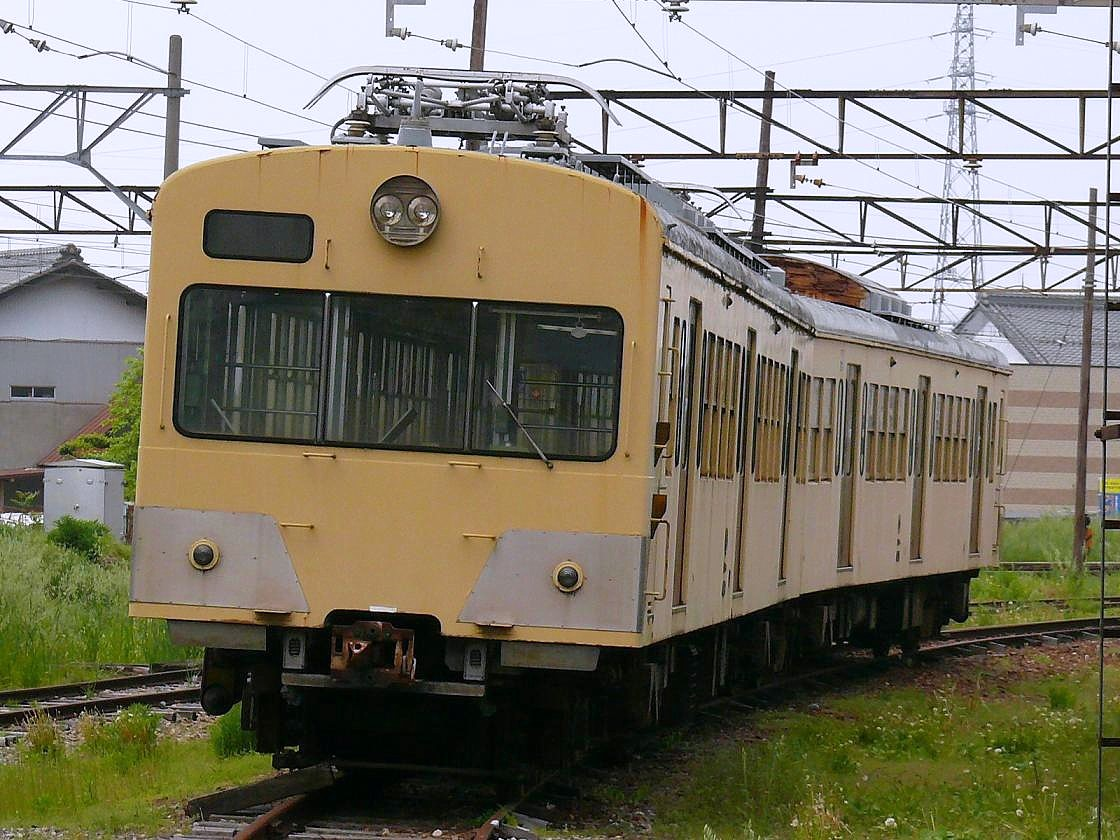
401 series trains were painted in Seibu All Yellow livery

The first 401 series train was constructed in 1968, then known as 411 series. At the time before conversion. 411 series cars had the MT15E traction motors, in later years Seibu converted all 411 series cars to Seibu 401 series. MT15E traction motors were replaced with MT46-based Hitachi resistor-controlled motors. The last remaining trains were withdrawn in 1997.

== Sangi Railway ==
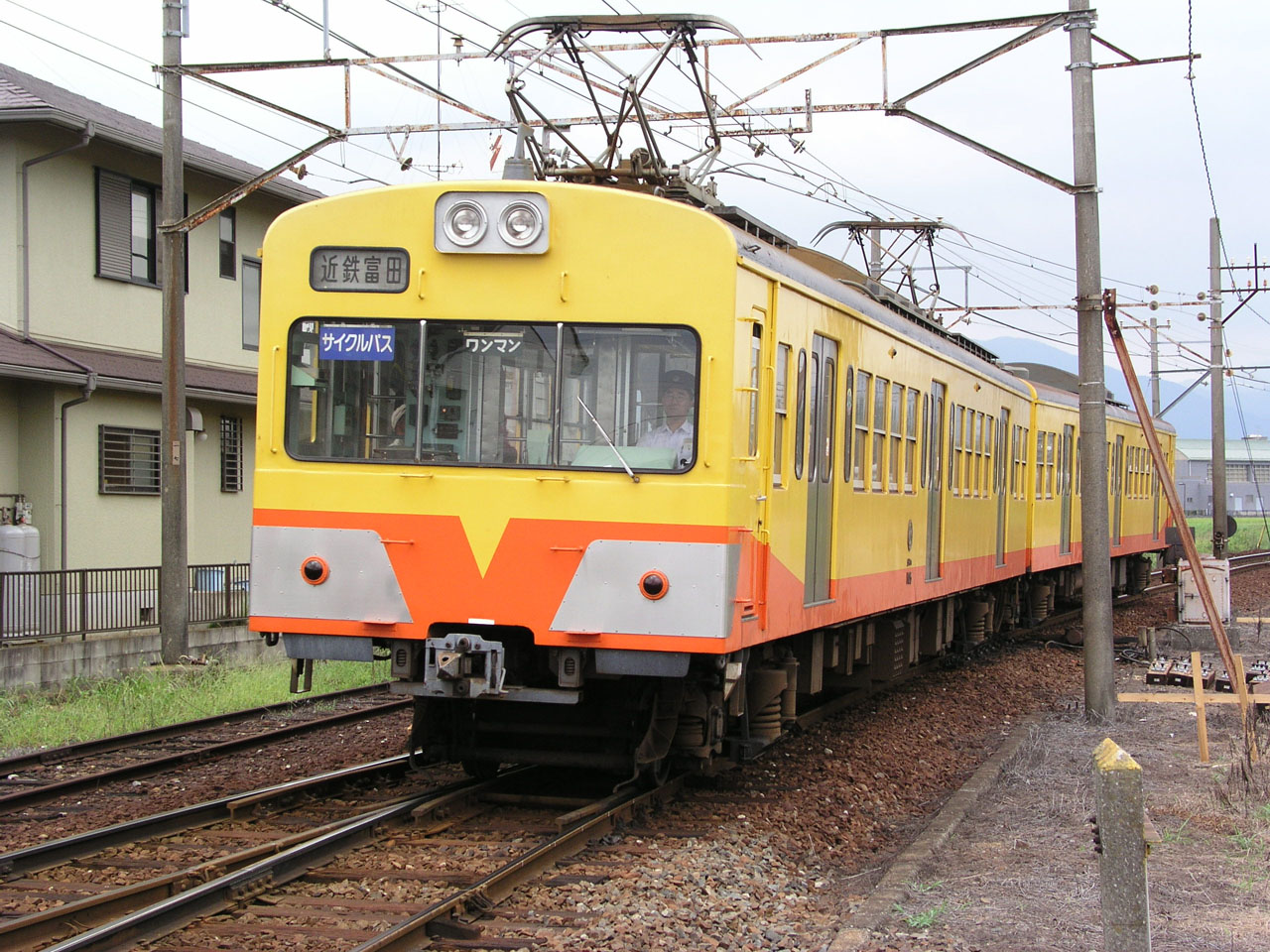
A Sangi Railway 101 series train

401 series train sets were transferred to Sangi Railway in 1990. Among other Seibu EMUs sent to that railway, it's the only 2-car EMU series on Sangi Railway line.

== Ohmi Railway ==
- Ohmi 800/820 series - entered service in 1997 (820 series) and 1998 (800 series)
- Ohmi 700 series - entered service in June 1998; withdrawn in 2019.

The 800 and 820 series conversion included modifications of the trains, so that they won't make contact with the station platforms.

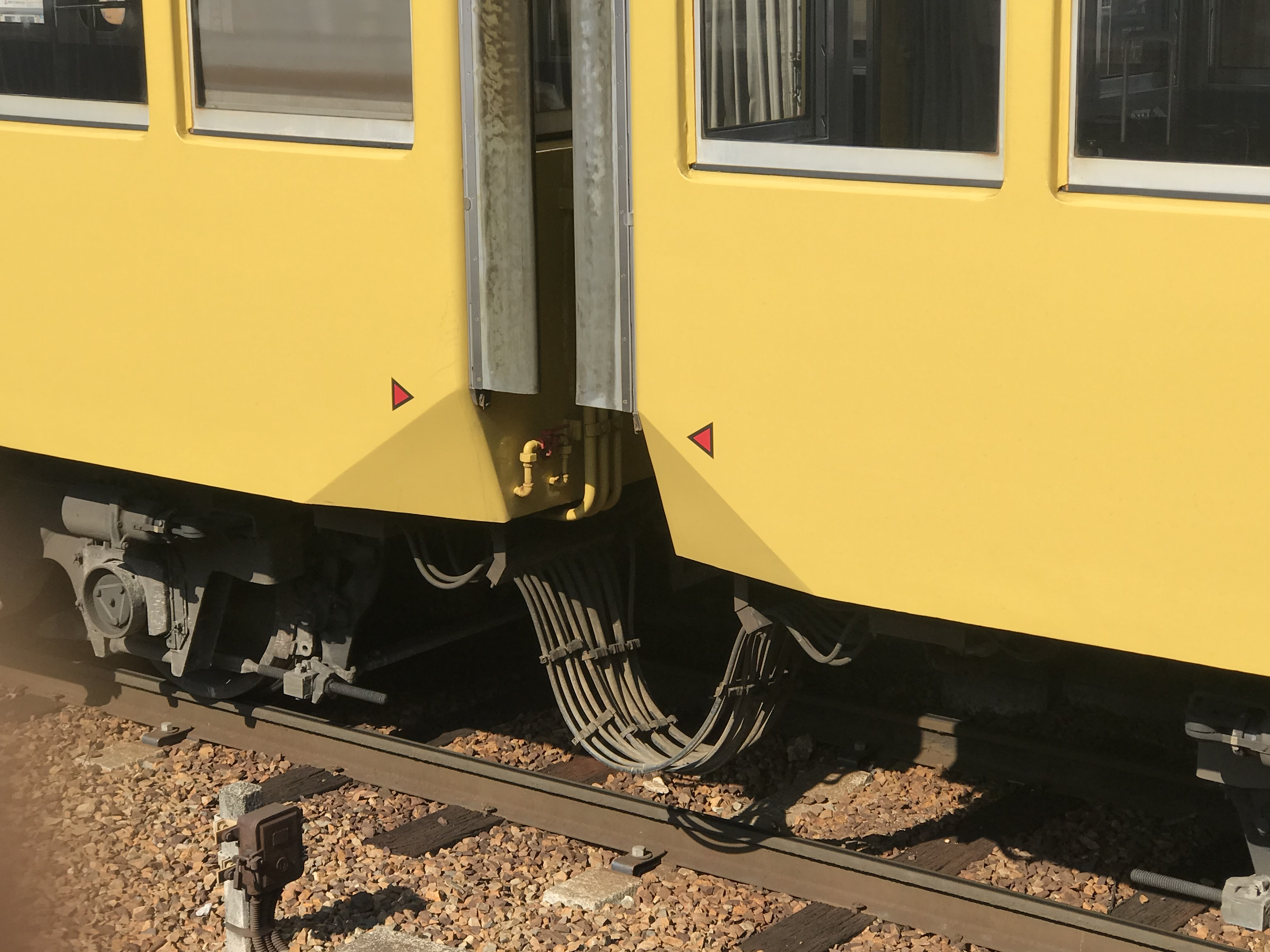
Modified inner car ends on a 800 series set

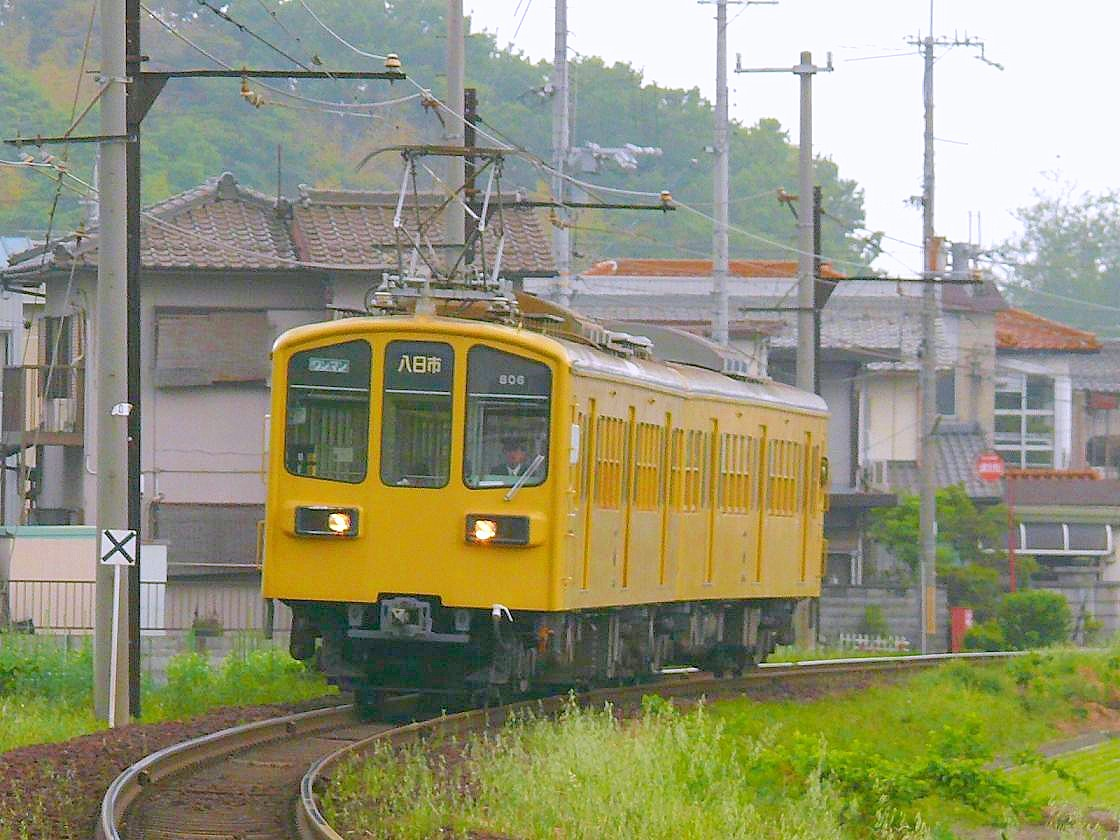
A 800 series train in May 2007

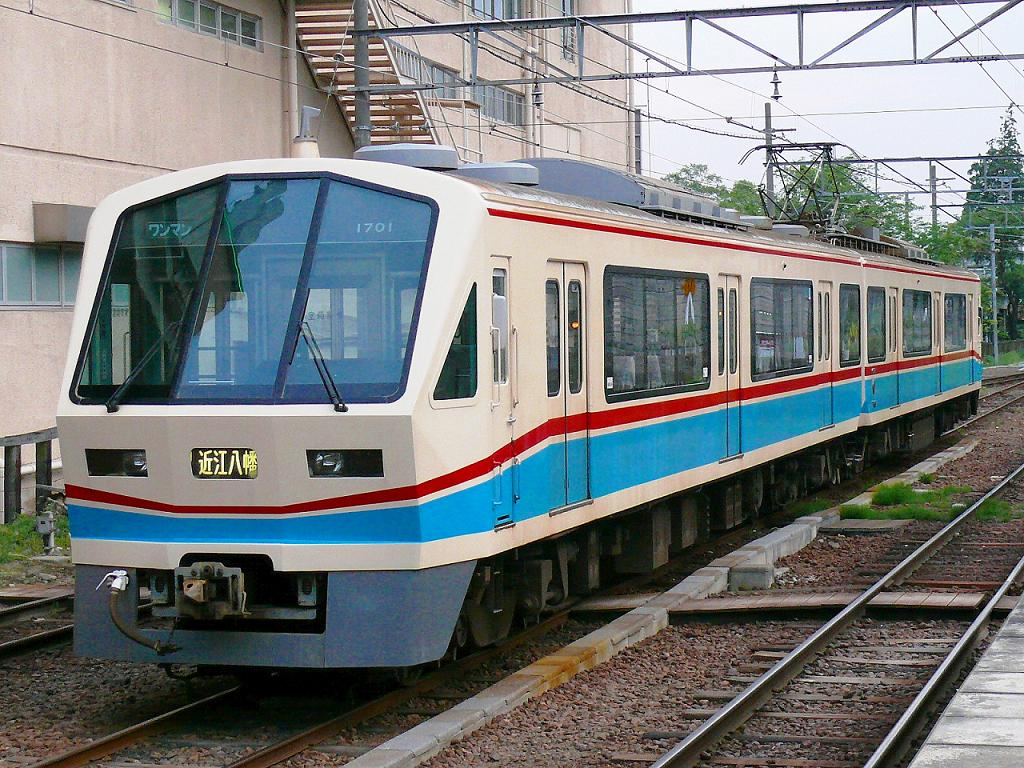
A 700 series train in May 2007

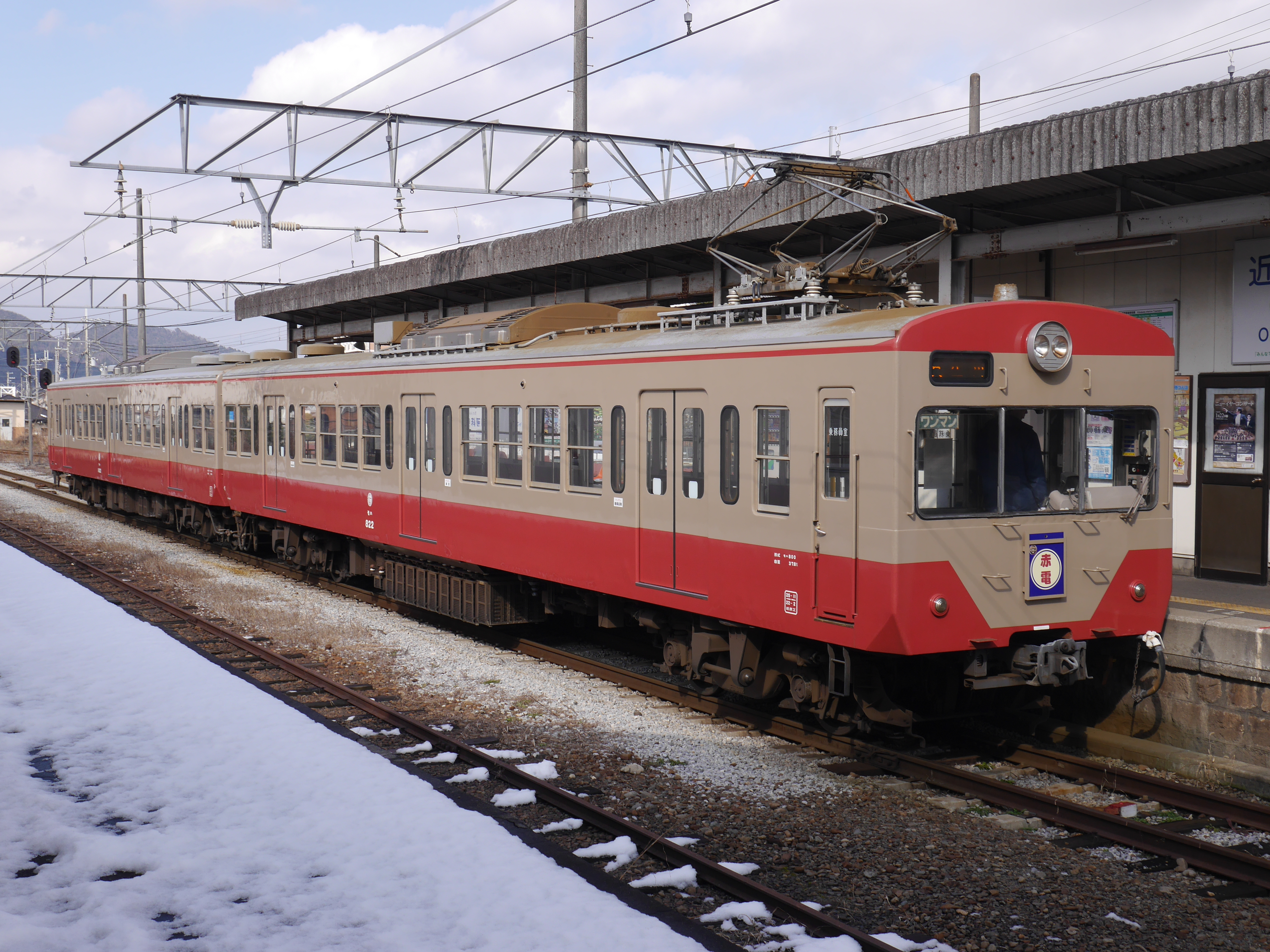
Ohmi Railway set 822F in January 2017
