= International Christian University High School =

Coordinates: 35°41′23″N 139°31′51″E

- 国際基督教大学高等学校
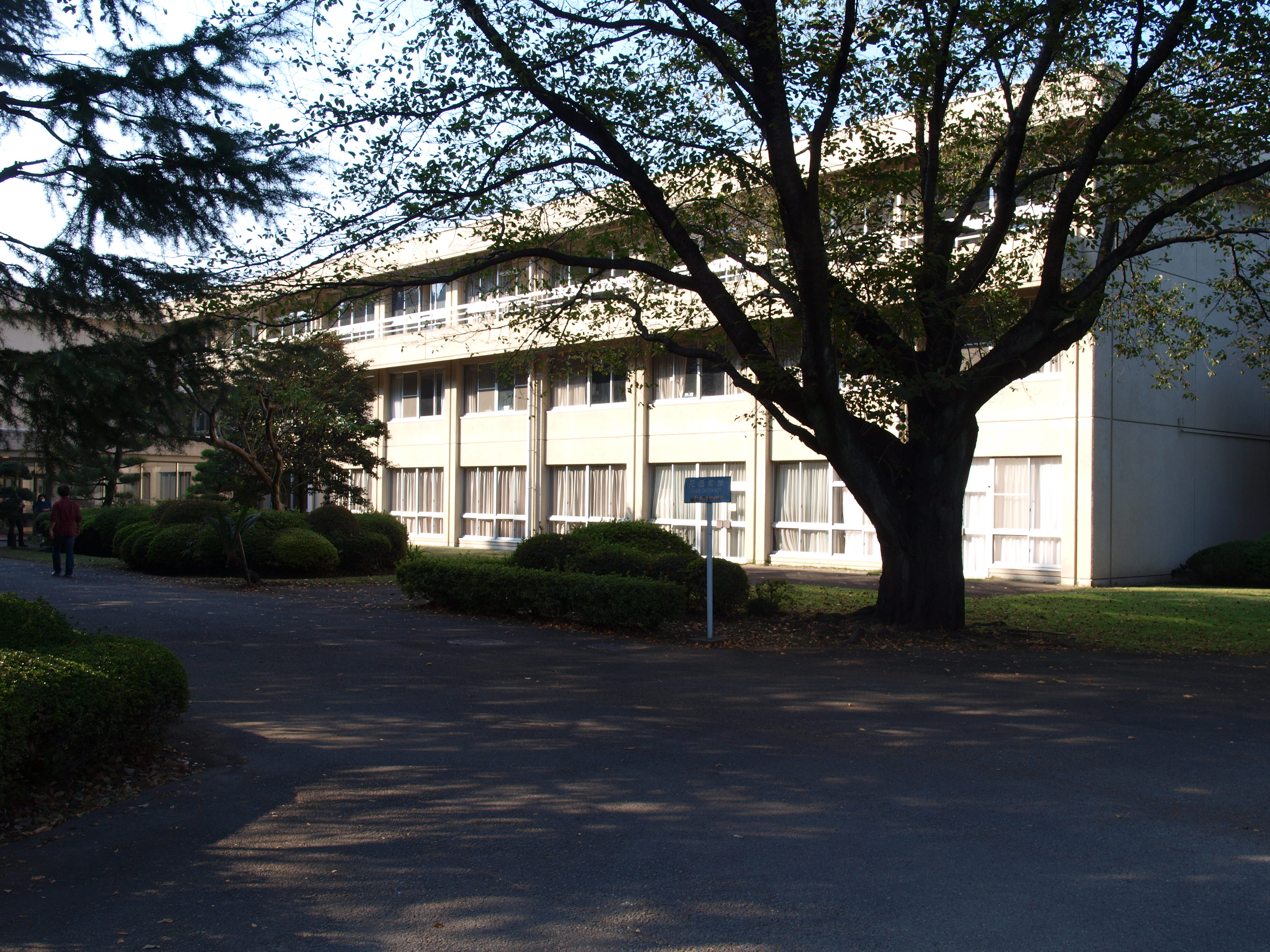
- Koganei, Tokyo; Japan

Information
- School type: Private
- Religious affiliation: Christianity
- Founded: 1978
- Head teacher: Yuichi Nakajima
- Grades: 10-12
- Gender: Co-educational Male:Female 1:2
- Age: 15 to 18
- Average class size: 40 (home room) 20 (lessons)
- Campus size: 75,869.88 m^{2}
- Colour: Blue Gold
- Nickname: ICUHS, ICU High
- Team name: ICUHS Falcons
- National ranking: Joint 7th
- Affiliation: International Christian University
- Website: http://icu-h.ed.jp/

International Christian University High School (国際基督教大学高等学校, Kokusai kirisutokyō daigaku kōtōgakkou) is a private high school located in Koganei, Tokyo, Japan. It is an affiliated school of the International Christian University.

== Background ==
The International Christian University High School was founded in 1978 and follows the principles of the Christian faith and the Universal Declaration of Human Rights.

About two-thirds of the student body is pupils planning to return to Japan. Students who show outstanding results in academic studies and school activities are recommended to the International Christian University.

== Notable alumni ==
- Mai Demizu, announcer and television presenter
- Hiroyuki Isobe, musician (member of Alexandros)
- Hitoshi Murayama, physicist
- Reina Triendl, model and actress
- Koki Uchiyama, voice actor

== See also ==
- List of high schools in Tokyo
- International Christian University
