= Musashi-Sakai Station =

Railway station in Musashino, Tokyo, Japan

Musashi-Sakai Station 武蔵境駅
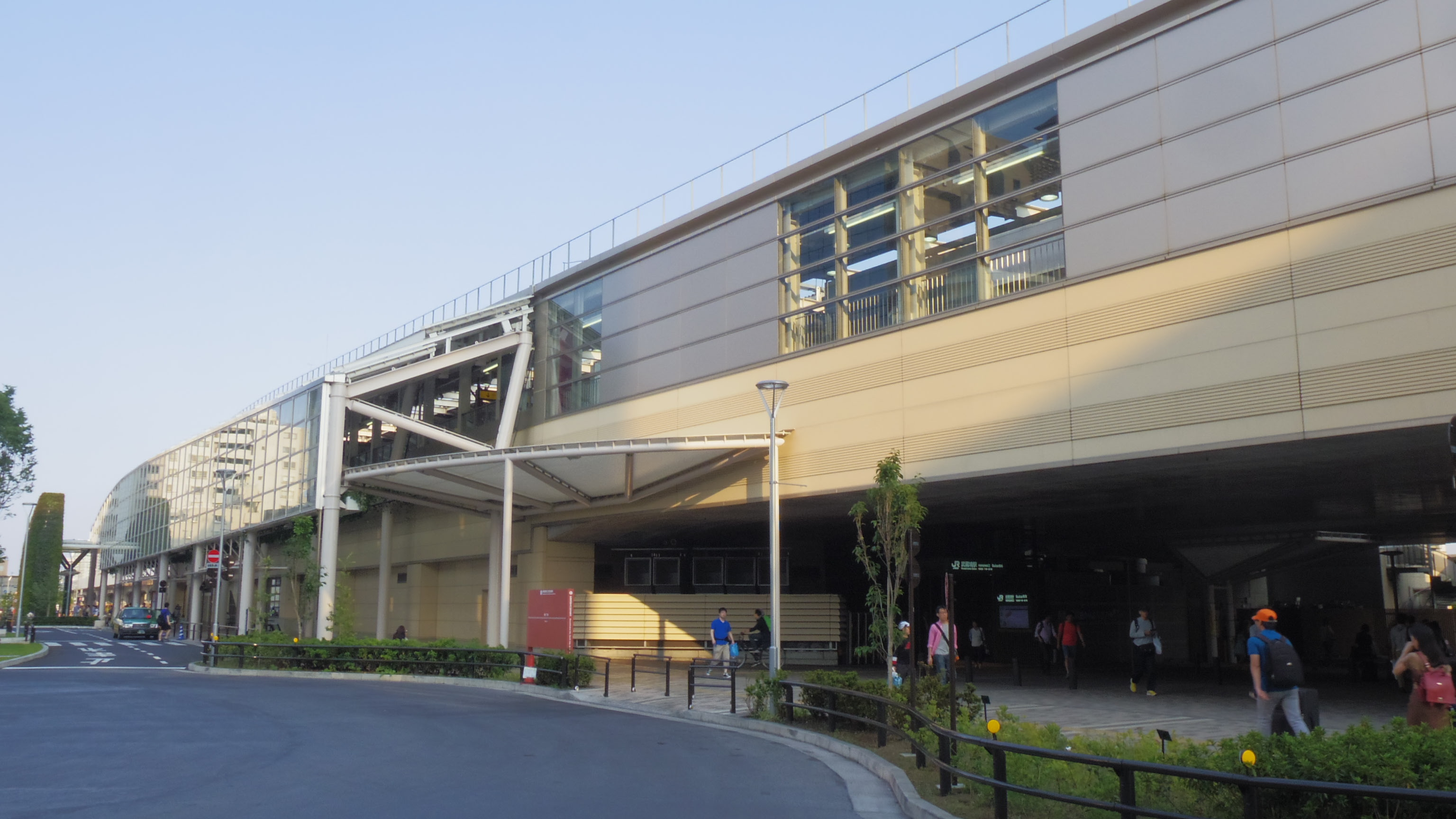
- North gate of Musashi-Sakai Station, May 2016

General information
- Location: Musashino, Tokyo; Japan
- Coordinates: 35°42′08″N 139°32′41″E
- Operator: JR East; Seibu Railway
- Lines: ■ Chūō Main Line; Seibu Tamagawa Line
Location
- Location within Tokyo Location within Japan

Musashi-Sakai Station (武蔵境駅, Musashi-sakai-eki) is an interchange passenger railway station located in the city of Musashino, Tokyo, Japan, operated by East Japan Railway Company (JR East) and the private railway company, Seibu Railway.

== Lines ==
Musashi-Sakai Station is served by the JR East Chūō Main Line, and is also the northern terminus of the short Seibu Tamagawa Line. It is not a major transfer station, and only the slowest services on the Chūō Rapid Line stop at Musashi-Sakai.

== JR East ==
JC13 Musashi-Sakai Station 武蔵境駅
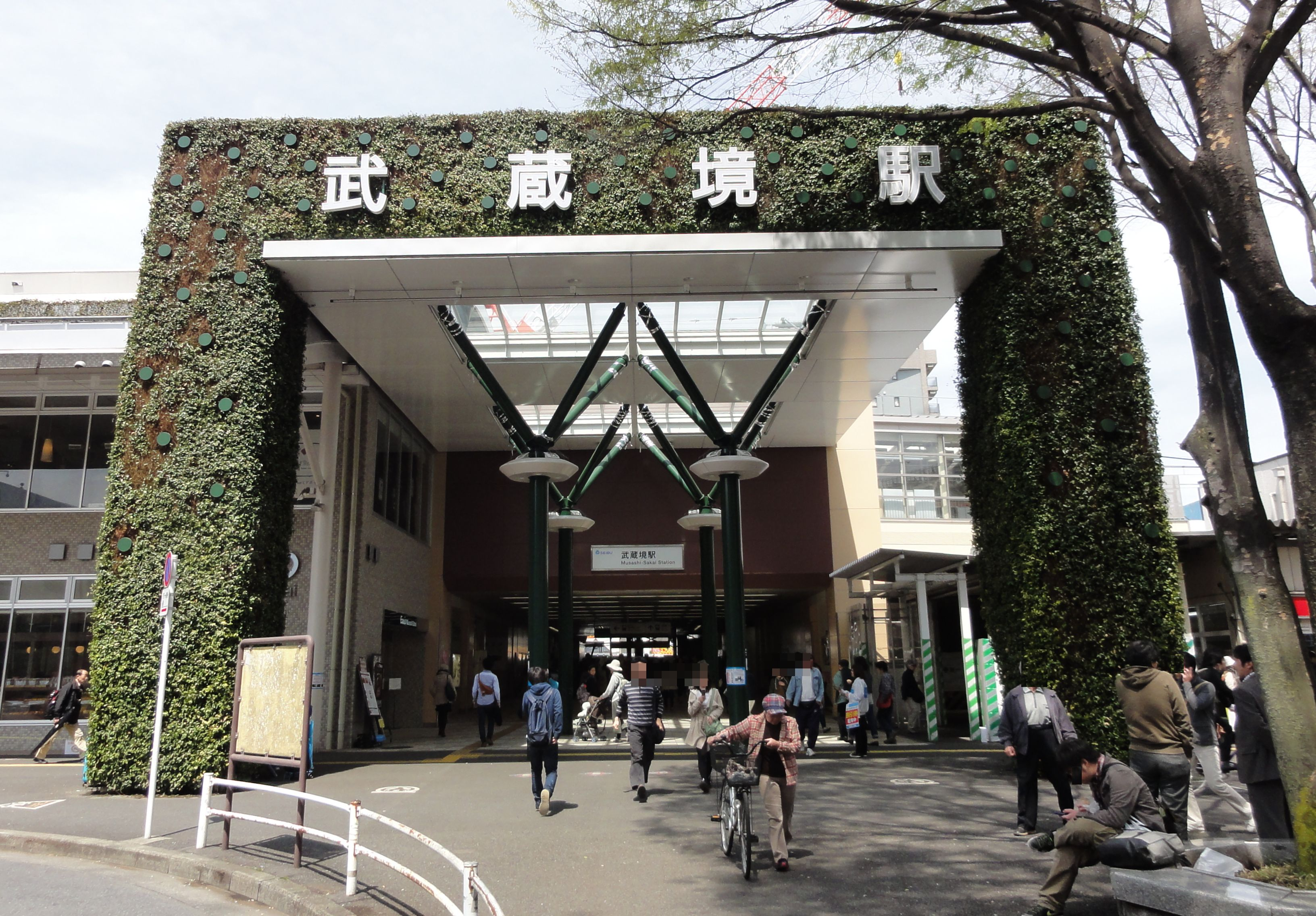
- South gate of Musashi-Sakai Station, April 2012

General information
- Location: 1-1-2 Sakai, Musashino-shi, Tokyo-to 180–0023; Japan
- Operator: JR East
- Line: ■ Chūō Main Line
- Distance: 25.7 km from Tokyo
- Platforms: 2 side platforms

Other information
- Status: Staffed (Midori no Madoguchi)
- Website: Official website

History
- Opened: 11 April 1889

Passengers
- FY2024: 126,936 (daily)

Services
Preceding station	JR East	Following station
Higashi-Koganei JC14 towards Ōtsuki	Chūō Line Rapid	Mitaka JC12 towards Tokyo
Location

=== Station layout ===
JR Musashi-Sakai Station has two elevated opposed side platforms serving two tracks, with the station building located underneath. The station has a Midori no Madoguchi staffed ticket office.

=== Platforms ===
1	Chūō Line (Rapid)	for Shinjuku and Tokyo
2	Chūō Line (Rapid)	for Tachikawa, Hachiōji and Takao

== Seibu ==
SW01 Musashi-Sakai Station 武蔵境駅
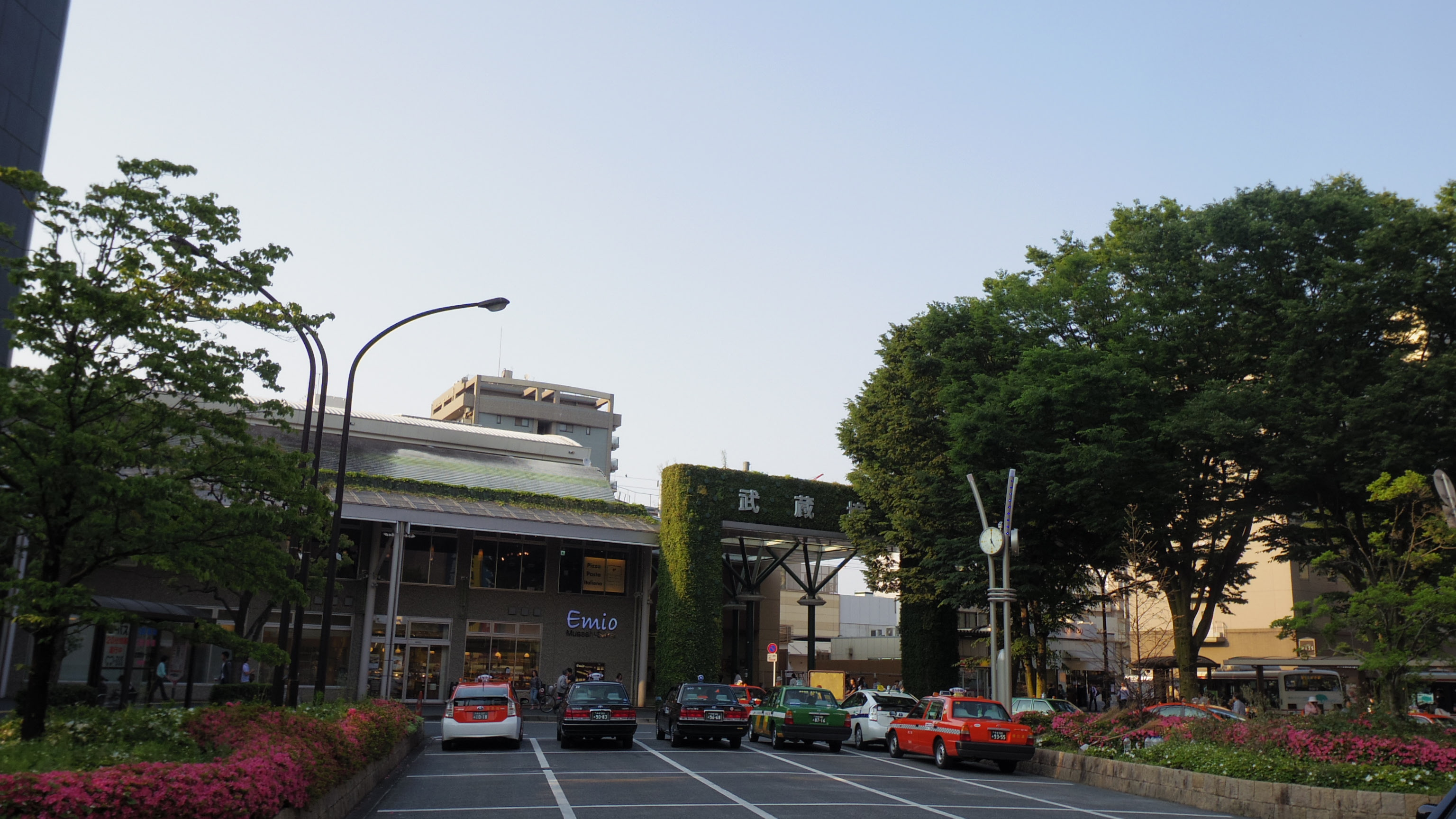
- South gate of Musashi-Sakai Station, May 2016

General information
- Location: 2-1-12 Sakaiminami, Musashino-shi, Tokyo-to 180–0023; Japan
- System: Seibu station
- Operator: Seibu Railway
- Line: Seibu Tamagawa Line
- Distance: 8.0 km from Koremasa
- Platforms: 1 island platform

Other information
- Station code: SW01
- Website: Official website

History
- Opened: 22 October 1917

Passengers
- FY2024: 29,002 (daily)

Services
Preceding station	Seibu Railway	Following station
Shin-Koganei SW02 towards Koremasa	Tamagawa Line	Terminus
Location

=== Station layout ===
The Seibu station has a single elevated dead-headed island platform serving two tracks, with the station building located underneath.

=== Platforms ===
3/4	Seibu Tamagawa Line	for Koremasa

== History ==
The JR station opened on 11 April 1889 as Sakai Station (境駅). The Tamagawa Line began operations on 22 October 1917. The station was renamed to its present name on 1 July 1919. The current station building was completed in 2008.

== Surrounding area ==
The area around Musashi-Sakai has the standard commercial activity common to suburban Tokyo train stations, with branches of the Ito Yokado department store, JR-owned Hotel Mets, and the Tokyo-Mitsubishi UFJ Bank, as well as a shopping street with many restaurants and small shops on the north side. The station has the standard taxi rank and bus stops, servicing bus routes between there and Hibarigaoka Station on the Seibu Ikebukuro Line to the north and Chōfu Station on the Keiō Line to the south.

It is the nearest train station to the International Christian University and the National Astronomical Observatory of Japan headquarters. Tama (formerly Tamabochimae), the second stop down on the Seibu Tamagawa Line, serves The American School in Japan, Nogawa Park, Tokyo University of Foreign Studies, and other institutions.

== Passenger statistics ==
In fiscal 2019, the JR station was used by an average of 68,907 passengers daily (boarding passengers only) making it the 67th busiest JR East station. In the same fiscal year, the station was the busiest on the Seibu Tamagawa Line and the 33rd busiest on the Seibu network as a whole with an average of 30,854 passengers daily.

The passenger figures in previous years are as shown below. Note that the JR East figures only consider boarding passengers whereas the Seibu figures consider both entering and exiting passengers.

Fiscal year	Daily average	
Fiscal year	JR East	Seibu
2005	60,084	26,679
2010	61,666	28,142
2015	66,772	30,127
