= Koganei =

Koganei 小金井市
- City
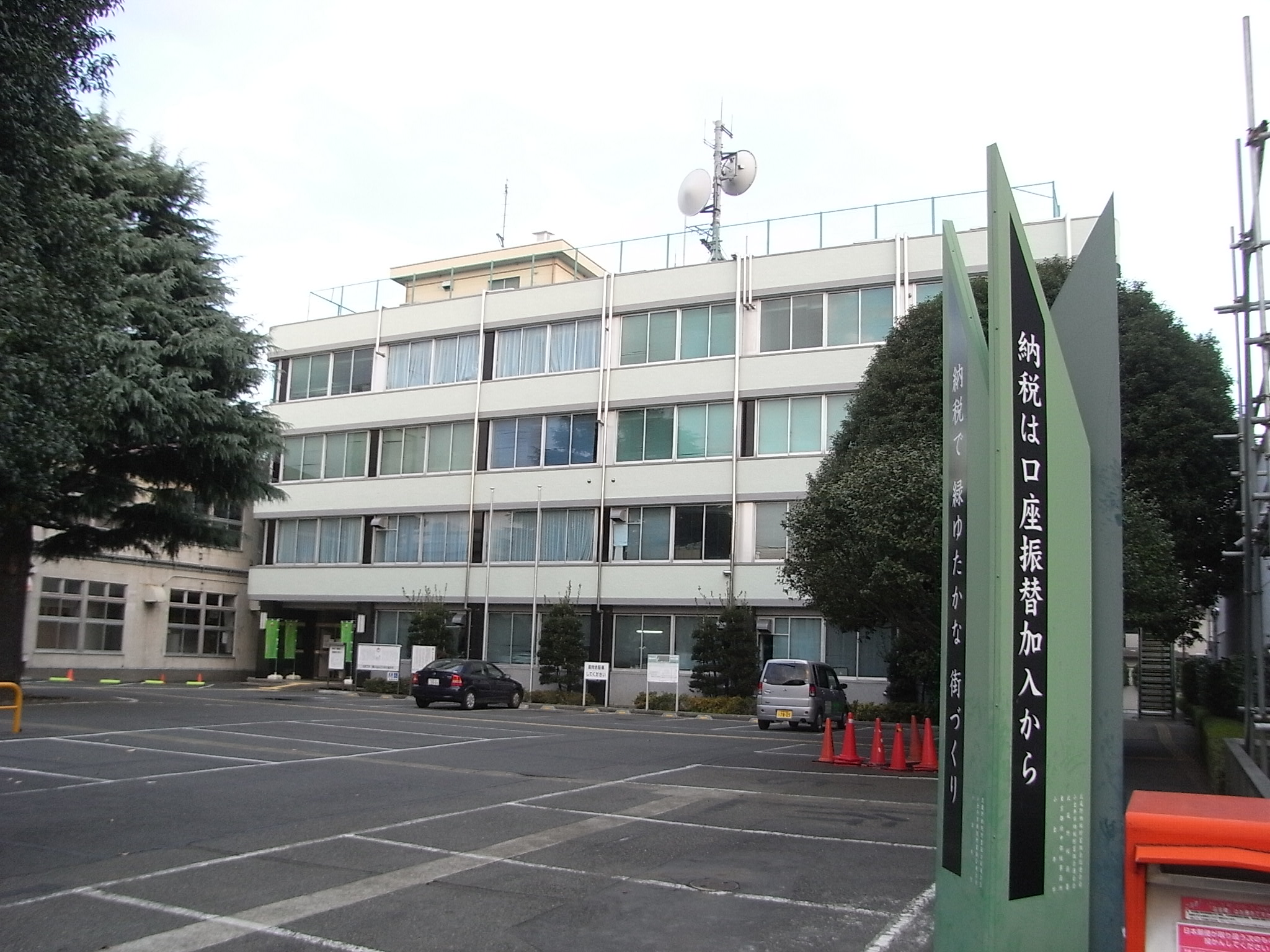
- Koganei City Hall

- Flag Seal

- Location of Koganei in Tokyo

- Coordinates: 35°41′58.1″N 139°30′10.7″E
- Country: Japan
- Region: Kantō
- Prefecture: Tokyo

Government
  - Mayor: Toru Shirai (since November 2022)

Area
  - Total: 11.30 km^{2} (4.36 sq mi)

Population (March 2021)
  - Total: 123,698
  - Density: 10,950/km^{2} (28,350/sq mi)
- Time zone: UTC+9 (Japan Standard Time)
- Symbols
  - Tree: Zelkova serrata
  - Flower: Sakura
  - Bird: Common kingfisher
  - Insect: Tree Cricket
- Phone number: 042-383-1111
- Address: 6-6-3 Honmachi, Koganei-shi, Tokyo 184-8504
- Website: Official website

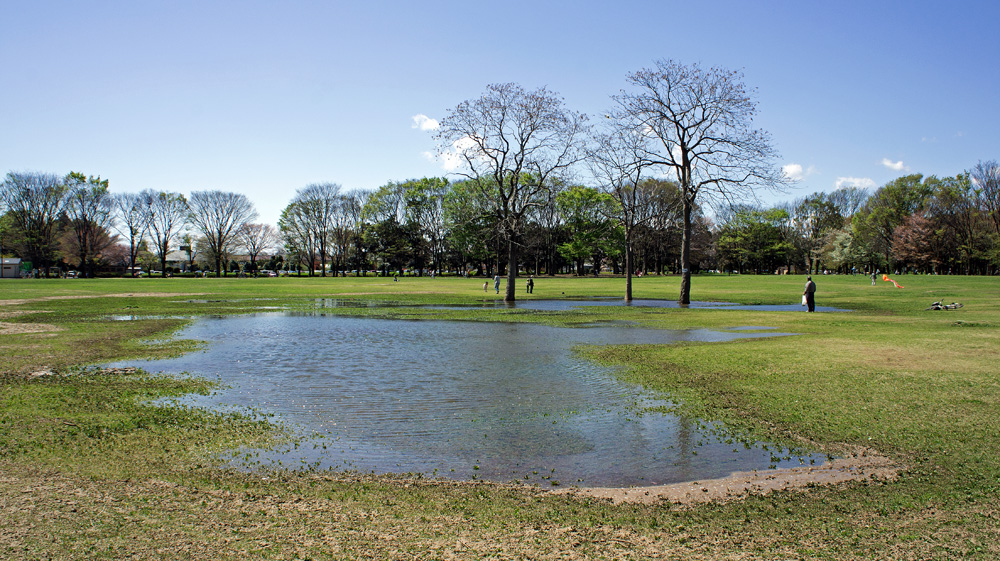
Koganei Park

Koganei (小金井市, Koganei-shi) is a city located in the western portion of the Tokyo Metropolis, Japan. As of 1 March 2021, the city had an estimated population of 123,698 in 61,832 households. The total area of the city is 11.30 square kilometres (4.36 sq mi) so the population density is about 11,000 persons per km².

== Geography ==
Koganei is approximately at the center of Tokyo, and is located about 20 kilometers west of Shinjuku, where Tokyo Metropolitan Government has its headquarters. It is flanked on the north and the south by two large parks. To the north is Koganei Park, which includes the Edo-Tokyo Open Air Architectural Museum, a branch of the Edo-Tokyo Museum located in Ryōgoku, Tokyo. To the south are Nogawa Park and Tama Cemetery. The city has an elevation of between 40 and 70 meters above sea level.

=== Surrounding municipalities ===
- Chōfu
- Mitaka
- Musashino
- Fuchū
- Kokubunji
- Kodaira
- Nishitokyo

=== Climate ===
Koganei has a humid subtropical climate (Köppen Cfa) characterized by warm summers and cool winters with light to no snowfall. The average annual temperature in Koganei is 14.0 °C. The average annual rainfall is 1647 mm with September as the wettest month. The temperatures are highest on average in August, at around 25.5 °C, and lowest in January, at around 2.6 °C.

== Demographics ==
Per Japanese census data, the population of Koganei grew rapidly in the 1950s and 1960s and has continued to grow at a slower rate since then.

Historical population
Year	Pop.	±%
1920	3,866	—
1930	6,129	+58.5%
1940	12,650	+106.4%
1950	22,616	+78.8%
1960	45,734	+102.2%
1970	94,448	+106.5%
1980	102,456	+8.5%
1990	105,899	+3.4%
2000	111,825	+5.6%
2010	118,852	+6.3%
2020	126,074	+6.1%

== History ==
The area of present-day Koganei was part of ancient Musashi Province. In the post-Meiji Restoration cadastral reform of July 22, 1878, the area became part of Kitatama District in Kanagawa Prefecture. The village of Koganei was created on April 1, 1889 with the establishment of the modern municipalities system. Kitatama District was transferred to the administrative control of Tokyo Metropolis on April 1, 1893. Koganei was elevated to town status in 1937, and to city status in 1958.

== Government ==
Koganei has a mayor-council form of government with a directly elected mayor and a unicameral city council of 24 members. Koganei contributes one member to the Tokyo Metropolitan Assembly. In terms of national politics, the city is part of Tokyo 18th district of the lower house of the Diet of Japan.

== Economy ==
Koganei is largely a bedroom community for central Tokyo. Studio Ghibli and KOGANEI have their corporate headquarters in Koganei.

Major agricultural products are tomatoes, aubergines (eggplants), roots, udo (plant related to ginseng, used in medicine and cooking), and rhubarbs. Businesses in the area include:

- M.S.C Inc.
- Gaina Co., Ltd.
- SynergySP Co., Ltd.
- Studio Ghibli
- ZEXCS Inc.
- Twilight Studio inc.
- feel. inc.
- KOGANEI Corporation
- Idexx Laboratories

== Education ==
=== Universities ===
- Hosei University - Koganei campus
- Tokyo University of Agriculture and Technology - Koganei campus
- Tokyo Gakugei University
- International Christian University (officially located in Mitaka, lies partially within Koganei).

=== High schools ===
Tokyo Metropolitan Government Board of Education operates the following public high schools.

- Koganei North High School
- Koganei Technical High School
- Tokyo Metropolitan Tama High School of Science and Technology

The following private high schools are also located in Koganei.

- Chuo University Junior and High School
- International Christian University High School
- Tokyo Denki University Junior High School/High School

=== Junior high and elementary schools ===
The Koganei Municipal Board of Education operates six public junior high schools and nine public elementary schools.

Public junior high schools include:

- Higashi (東中学校)
- Koganei No. 1 (小金井第一中学校)
- Koganei No. 2 (小金井第二中学校)
- Midori (緑中学校)
- Minami (南中学校)

Public elementary schools include:

- Higashi (東小学校)
- Honcho (本町小学校)
- Koganei No. 1 (小金井第一小学校)
- Koganei No. 2 (小金井第二小学校)
- Koganei No. 3 (小金井第三小学校)
- Koganei No. 4 (小金井第四小学校)
- Maehara (前原小学校)
- Midori (緑小学校)
- Minami (南小学校)

There is one private junior high school and one private elementary school.

== Transportation ==
Koganei is not served by any national highways or expressways.

Railway links include: JR East – Chūō Main Line

- Higashi-Koganei - Musashi-Koganei

- Seibu Railway - Seibu Tamagawa Line

- Shin-Koganei
