= Koremasa Station =

Railway station in Fuchū, Tokyo, Japan

SW06 Koremasa Station 是政駅
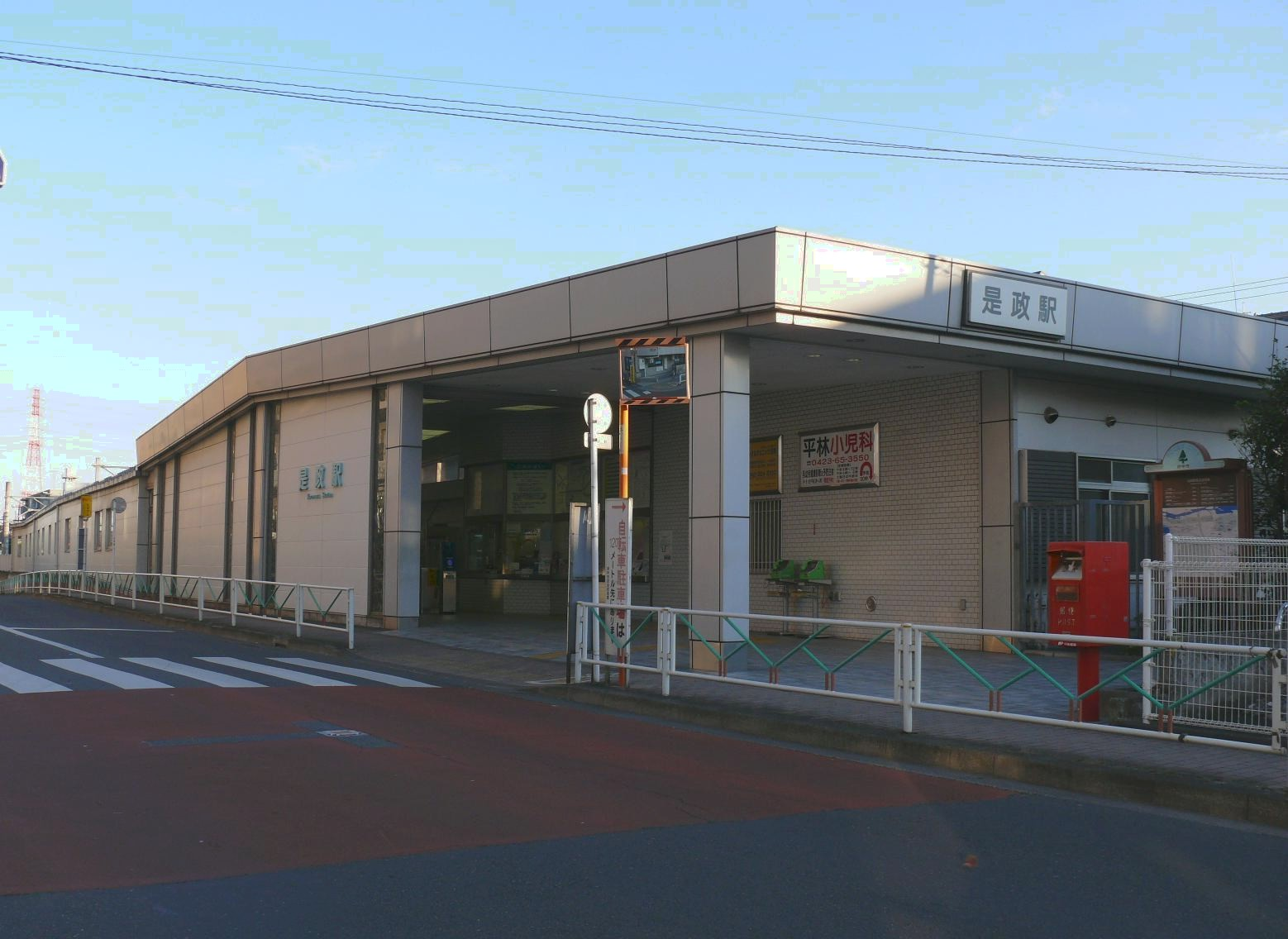
- Koremasa Station entrance, 2007

General information
- Location: 5-8-2 Koremasa, Fuchū-shi, Tokyo 183-0014; Japan
- Coordinates: 35.6564°N 139.4889°E
- Operator: Seibu Railway
- Line: Seibu Tamagawa Line
- Distance: 8.0 km from Musashi-Sakai
- Platforms: 1 side platform
- Tracks: 1

Other information
- Station code: SW06
- Website: Official website

History
- Opened: June 20, 1922

Passengers
- FY2019: 7,838

Services
Preceding station	Seibu Railway	Following station
Terminus	Tamagawa Line	Kyōteijōmae SW05 towards Musashi-Sakai
Location
- Location within Tokyo Location within Japan

Koremasa Station (是政駅, Koremasa-eki) is a passenger railway station located in the city of Fuchū, Tokyo, Japan, operated by the private railway operator Seibu Railway.

== Lines ==
Koremasa Station is a terminus of the Seibu Tamagawa Line, and is located 8.0 kilometers from the opposing terminus of the line at Musashi-Sakai in Tokyo.

== Station layout ==
The station has a single side platform serving a single-directional track.

=== Platforms ===
1	Seibu Tamagawa Line	for Musashi-Sakai

== History ==
The station opened on June 20, 1922.

Station numbering was introduced on all Seibu Railway lines during fiscal 2012, with Koremasa Station becoming "SW06".

== Passenger statistics ==
In fiscal 2019, the station was the 73rd busiest on the Seibu network with an average of 7,838 passengers daily.

The passenger figures for previous years are as shown below.

Fiscal year	Daily average
2005	7,982
2010	7,410
2015	7,810

== Surrounding area ==
- Tama River

== See also ==
- List of railway stations in Japan
