= Koto Driver's License Center =

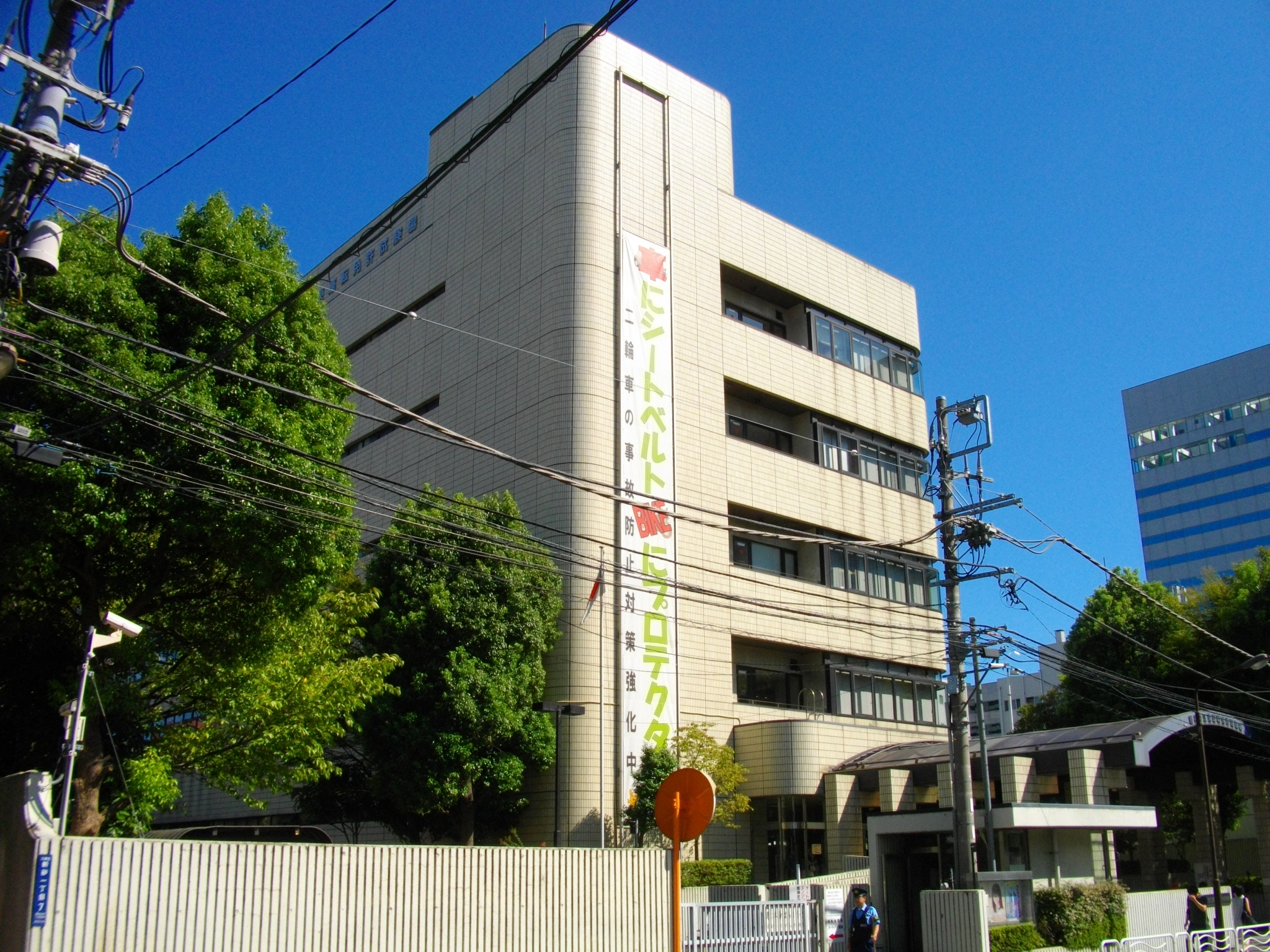
- Interactive map of the Koto Driver's License Center area

General information
- Location: 1-7-24 Shinsuna, Koto City, Tokyo 136-0075
- Coordinates: 35°40′08″N 139°49′21″E
- Opened: 1984

Koto Driver's License Center (江東運転免許試験場, Kōtō unten menkyo shikenjō) is a driver's license examination site managed by the Tokyo Metropolitan Police Department and located in Kōtō Ward, Tokyo, Japan. Since there are no on-site examination courses, driver's license examinations are only for those who have graduated from designated driving schools in Japan. Training is carried out by borrowing a designated driving school nearby. The center opened in 1984.

It is one of only three centers in Tokyo, along with Samezu Driver's License Center (Shinagawa) and Fuchu Driver's License Center (Fuchū), where foreigners can get a driving license.

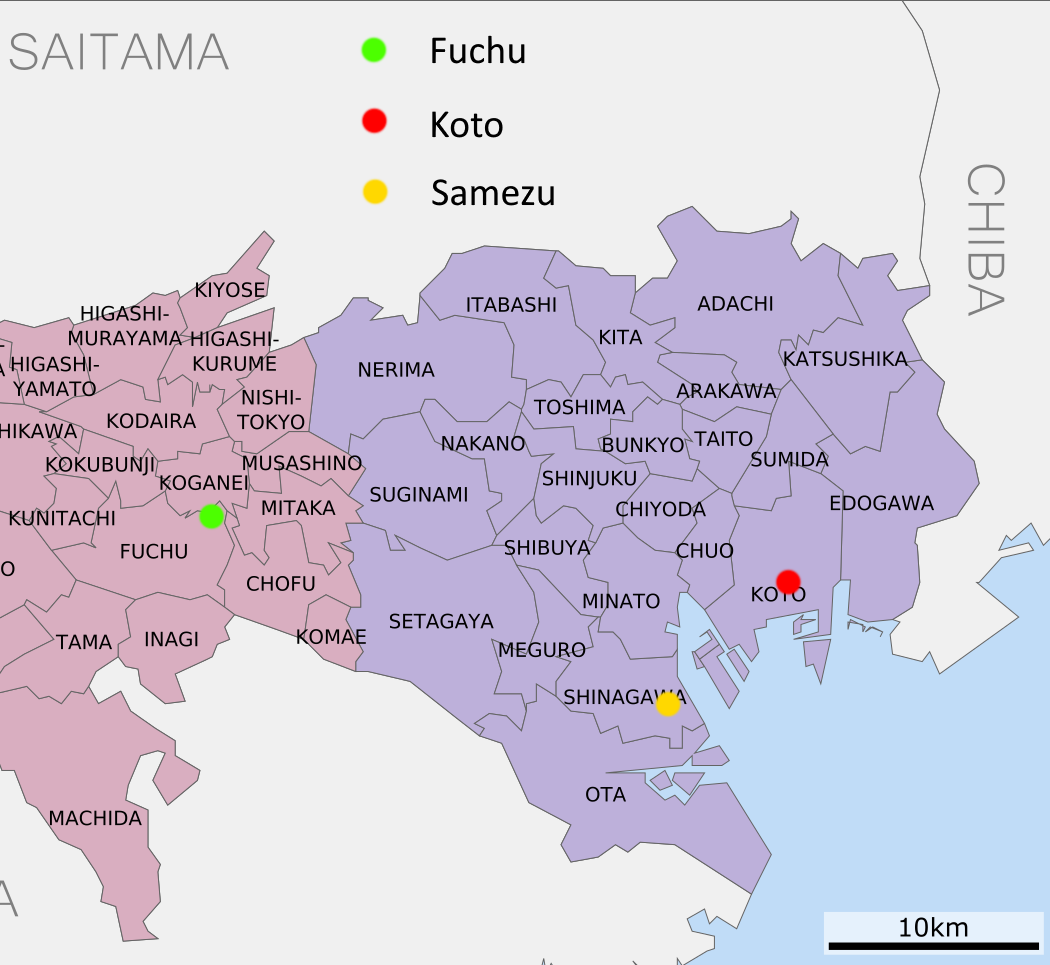
Driver's license centers in Tokyo
