= Fuchū Station =

Fuchū Station (府中駅, Fuchū-eki) may refer to several railway stations in Japan

- Fuchū Station (Hiroshima)
- Fuchū Station (Tokyo)
