= Kagai =

Kagai may refer to:

- Hanamachi (花街), a geisha district
- Utagaki (歌垣), a peasant gathering

(kagai is a secondary reading of these words)
