= Musashinodai Station =

Railway station in Fuchū, Tokyo, Japan

Musashinodai Station 武蔵野台駅

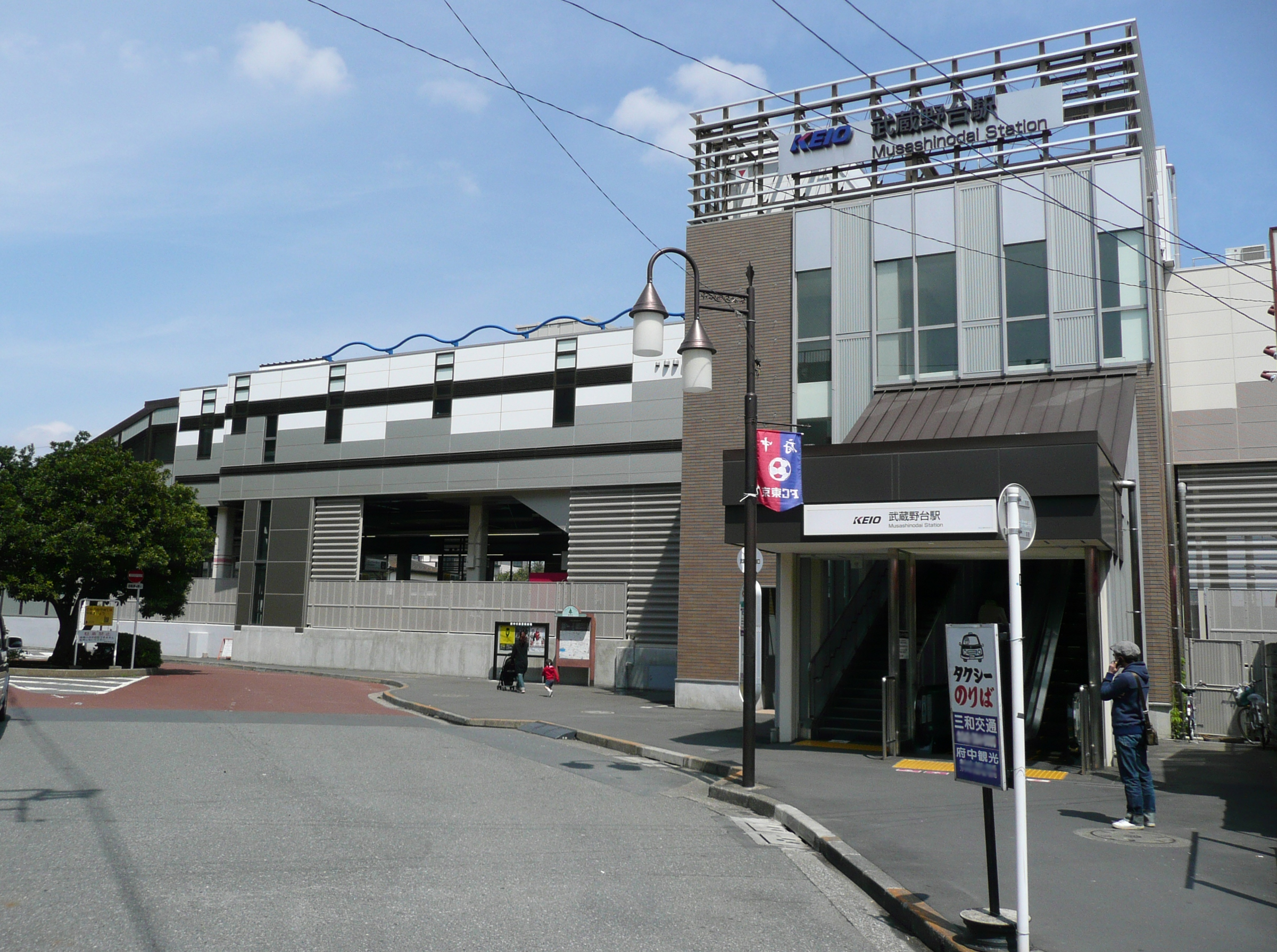
- Musashinodai Station, April 2014

General information
- Location: 4-18-4 Shiraitodai, Fuchū-shi, Tokyo 183-0011; Japan
- Coordinates: 35.6642°N 139.5112°E
- Operator: Keio Corporation
- Line: Keio Line
- Distance: 18.8 km from Shinjuku
- Platforms: 2 side platforms
- Tracks: 2

Other information
- Station code: KO21
- Website: Official website

History
- Opened: October 31, 1913; 112 years ago
- Rebuilt: 2010

Passengers
- FY2019: October 31, 1913 (daily)

Services
Preceding station	Keio Corporation	Following station
Tama-reien towards Keiō-hachiōji	Keiō Line Rapid Local	Tobitakyū towards Shinjuku
Location
- Location within Tokyo Location within Japan

Musashinodai Station (武蔵野台駅, Musashinodai-eki) is a passenger railway station located in the city of Fuchū, Tokyo, Japan, operated by the private railway operator Keio Corporation.

== Lines ==
Musashinodai Station is served by the Keio Line, and is located 18.8 kilometers from the starting point of the line at Shinjuku Station.

== Station layout ==
This station consists of two opposed side platforms serving two tracks, with the station building located above and at a right angle to the tracks and platforms.

=== Platforms ===
1	Keiō Line	for Keiō-Hachiōji; Keiō Dōbutsuen Line for Tama-Dōbutsukōen (via Takahatafudō); Keiō Takao Line for Takaosanguchi (via Kitano)
2	Keiō Line	for Chōfu, Meidaimae, Sasazuka, and Shinjuku; Toei Shinjuku Line for Moto-Yawata

== History ==
The station opened on October 31, 1913. A new station building was completed in 2010.

== Passenger statistics ==
In fiscal 2019, the station was used by an average of 26,232 passengers daily.

The passenger figures (boarding passengers only) for previous years are as shown below.

Fiscal year	daily average
2005	24,206
2010	24,821
2015	25,201

== See also ==
- List of railway stations in Japan
