= Fuchū Station (Tokyo) =

Railway station in Fuchū, Tokyo, Japan

Fuchū Station 府中駅

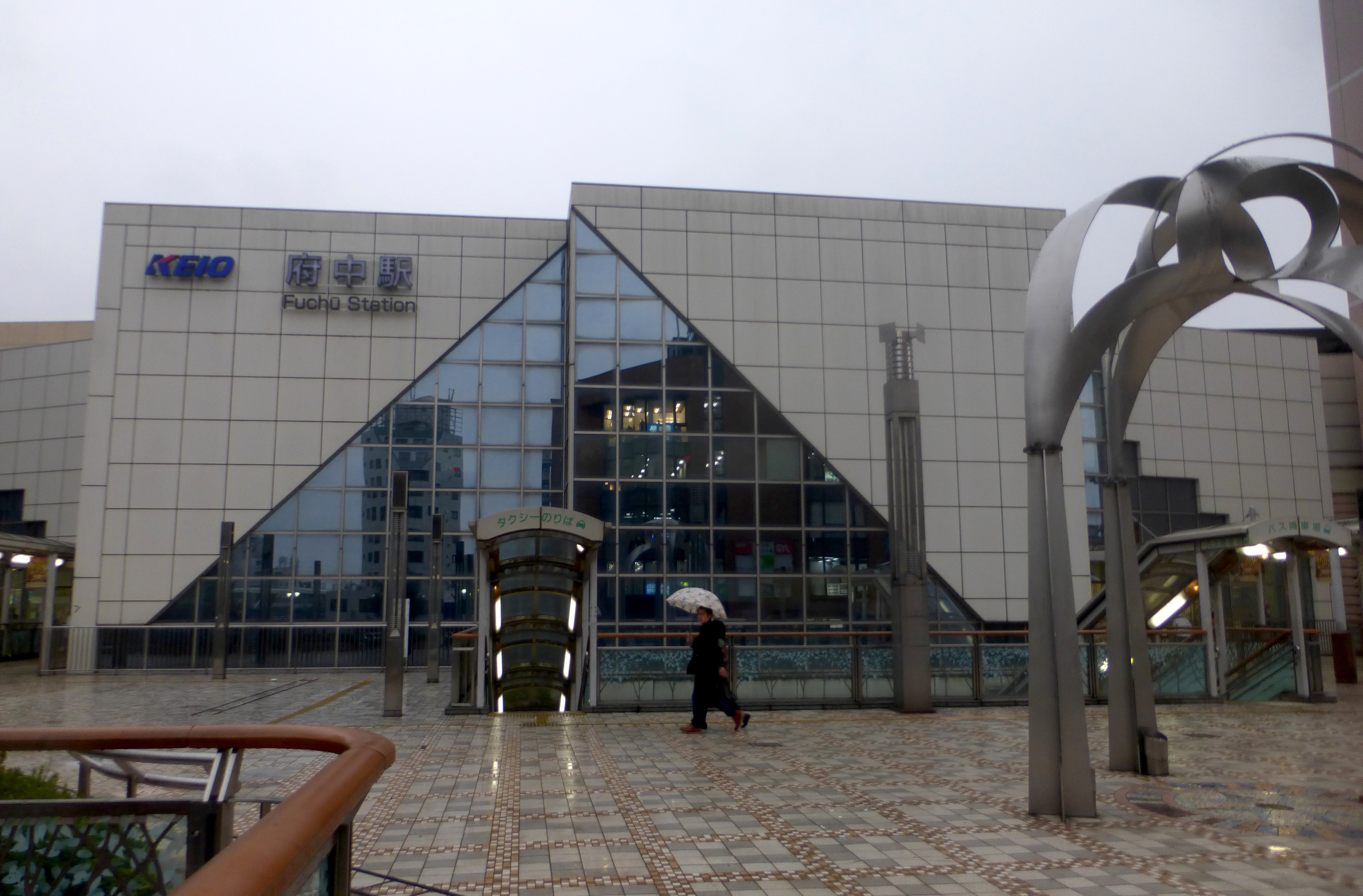
- The station building and entrance in November 2015

General information
- Location: 1-1-10 Miyacho, Fuchū-shi, Tokyo 183-0055; Japan
- Coordinates: 35.672175°N 139.480426°E
- Operator: Keio Corporation
- Line: Keio Line
- Distance: 21.9 km from Shinjuku
- Platforms: 2 island platforms
- Tracks: 4

Other information
- Status: Staffed
- Station code: KO24
- Website: Official website

History
- Opened: 31 October 1916; 109 years ago

Passengers
- FY2019: 88,769 (daily)

Services
Preceding station	Keio Corporation	Following station
Bubaigawara One-way operation	Keiō Line Mt Takao	Meidaimae towards Shinjuku
Bubaigawara towards Keiō-hachiōji	Keiō Liner	Meidaimae towards Shinjuku
Bubaigawara towards Keiō-hachiōji	Keiō Line Special Express	Chōfu towards Shinjuku
Bubaigawara towards Keiō-hachiōji	Keiō Line Express Semi Express Rapid Local	Higashi-fuchū towards Shinjuku
Location
- Location within Tokyo Location within Japan

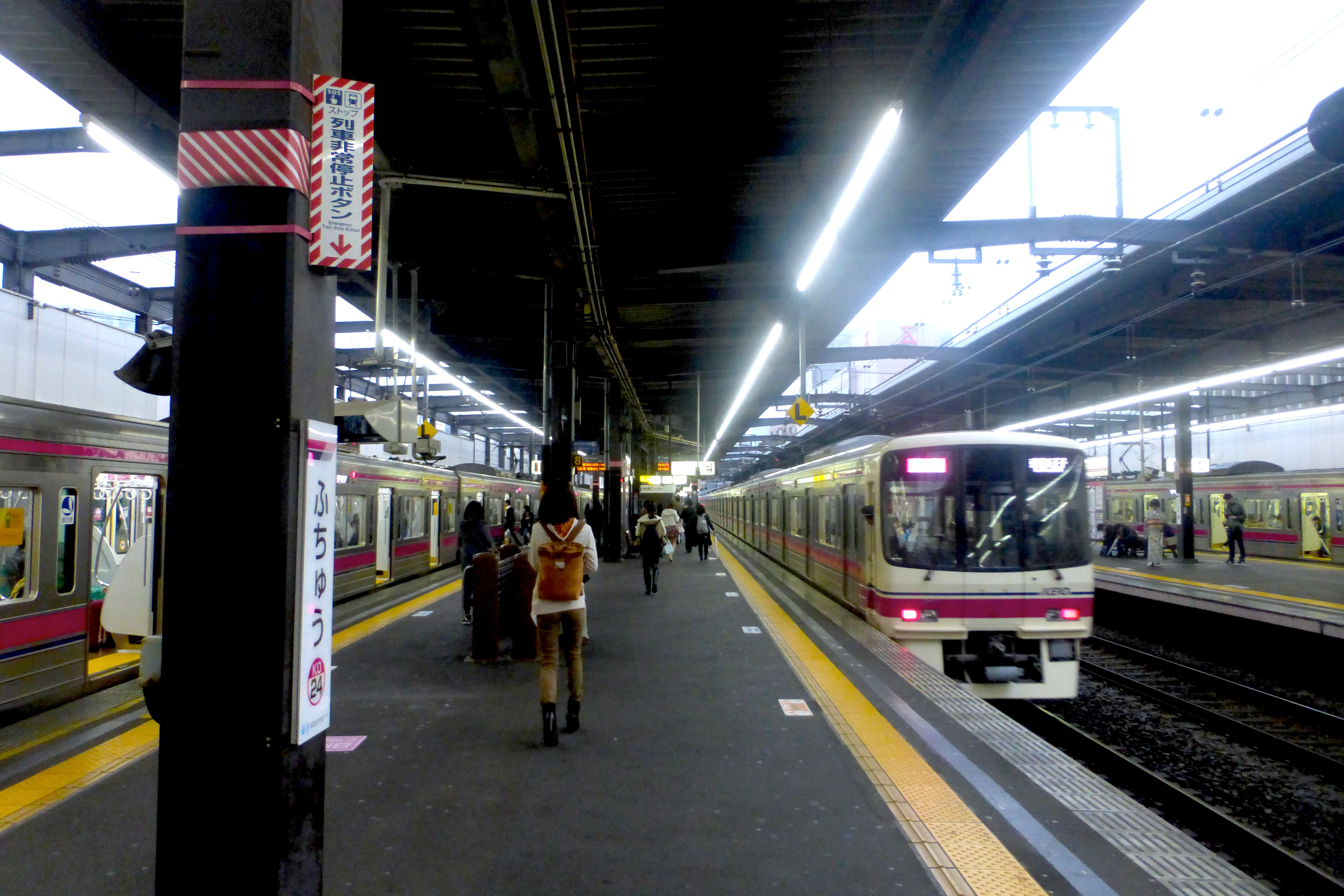
The platforms in November 2015

Fuchū Station (府中駅, Fuchū-eki) is a passenger railway station located in the city of Fuchū, Tokyo, Japan, operated by the private railway operator Keio Corporation. It is numbered "KO24".

== Lines ==
Fuchū Station is served by the 37.9 km Keio Line from Shinjuku to Keiō-hachiōji, and is located 21.9 km from the Tokyo terminus of the line at Shinjuku.

== Station layout ==
This station consists of two island platforms serving four tracks, with each platform on a passing loop.

=== Platforms ===
1, 2	Keiō Line	for Keiō-Hachiōji; Keiō Dōbutsuen Line for Tama-Dōbutsukōen (via Takahatafudō); Keiō Takao Line for Takaosanguchi (via Kitano)
3, 4	Keiō Line	for Chōfu, Meidaimae, Sasazuka, and Shinjuku; Toei Shinjuku Line for Moto-Yawata

== History ==
The station opened on 31 October 1916. The new elevated station building opened on 1 March 1993.

== Passenger statistics ==
In fiscal 2019, the station was used by an average of 88,769 passengers daily.

The passenger figures (boarding passengers only) for previous years are as shown below.

Fiscal year	daily average
2005	84,601
2010	85,993
2015	86,949

== Surrounding area ==
- National Route 20
- Fuchū City Office
- Tokyo Metropolitan Nogyo High School
- Fuchūhommachi Station on the Musashino Line and Nambu Line
- Okunitama Shrine

== See also ==
- List of railway stations in Japan
