= Metropolitan Police Academy (Tokyo) =

Police academy of the Tokyo Metropolitan Police Department

Coordinates: 35.6684°N 139.5202°E

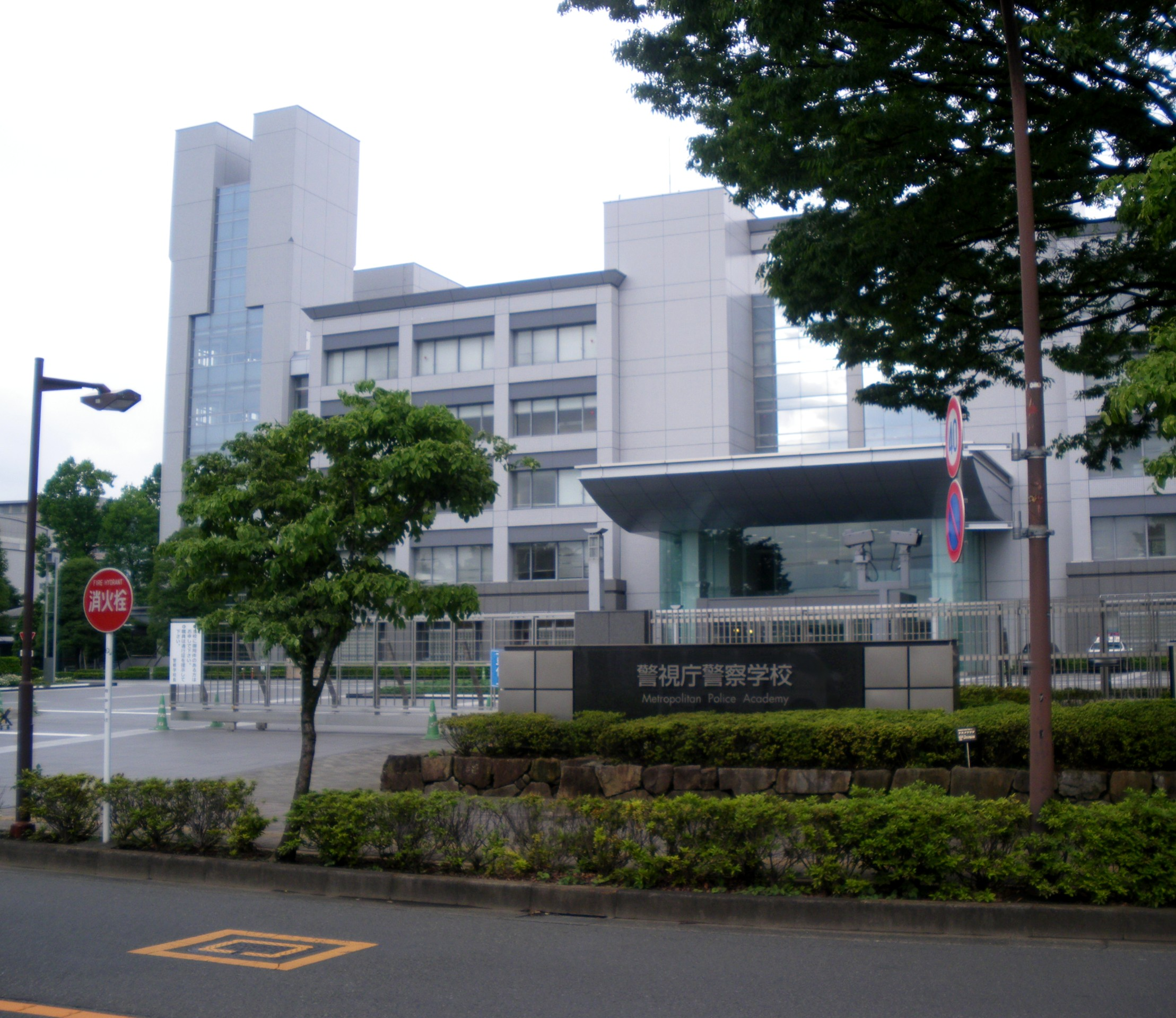
Exterior of the Metropolitan Police Academy

The Metropolitan Police Academy (警視庁警察学校, Keishicho Keisatsudai gakkō) is the police academy of the Tokyo Metropolitan Police Department, located in Fuchū, Tokyo. Its construction was completed in August 2002.

== History ==
The 14-story facility was completed in August 2002. It features an indoor swimming pool and modern dormitories where students are required to reside.

The academy hosted an open house event for the first time in March 2015, offering private seminars, fingerprint collecting and other activities in the hopes of combatting a recent decline of applications.

== Examinations ==
Upon acceptance recruits are enrolled in a training course involving "physical strength, vitality and character building." After completing this training recruits move on to the main curriculum. Graduates of high school, junior colleges, or universities are all welcome to apply; however, university graduates are given a training course of only six months, while high school and junior college graduates are trained for ten months.

== Curriculum ==
The curriculum includes both general education subjects such as ethics and courses geared for police work such as laws, martial arts such as kendo and judo, and shooting firearms.

Specialized courses offered at the academy include:

- Criminal investigation/identification
- International organized crime control
- Community safety investigation
- Cybercrime investigation
- Traffic investigation
- Crime victim assistance
- Patrol car officer
- Police motorcycle officer
- SP (Security Police)
- Judo and Kendo instructor training
- Sign language

There are also courses available for study overseas or other non-academy locations, such as:

- Computer technology
- Diving training
- Automobile mechanic
- Motorboat operation
- Aircraft maintenance
- Police dog training
- Foreign languages (Including English, Mandarin, Korean, Persian, Tagalog, and Spanish)
- Bookkeeping
- First aid

== Student life ==
"The trainees....lead an orderly life at this institute by precisely following daily routines." There are various club activities offered in their down time.
