= Kyōdo-no-Mori =

Open-air folk museum in Fuchū, Tokyo, Japan

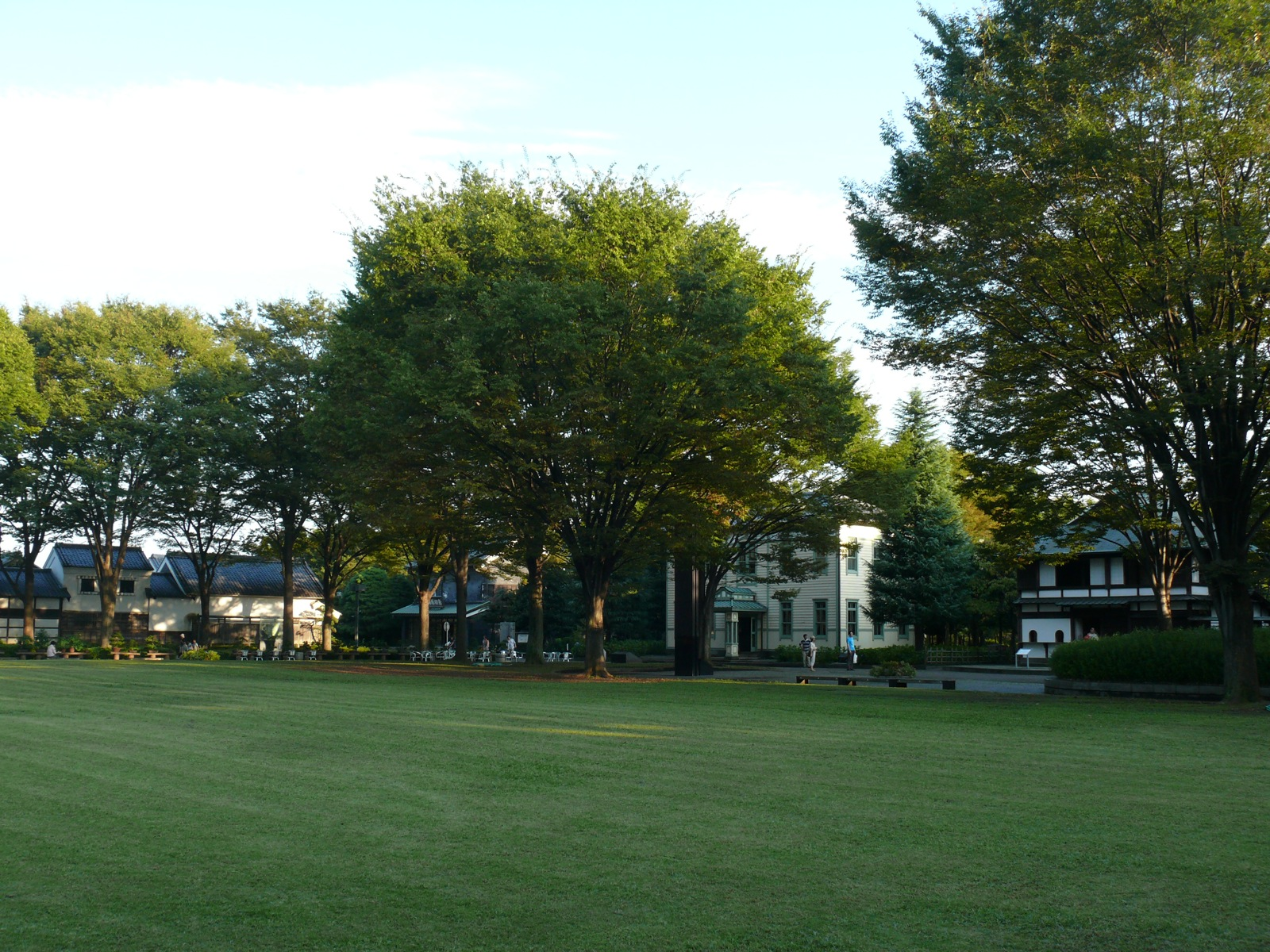
- Kyodo no Mori Historic Buildings
- Interactive map of Kyōdo-no-Mori
- Type: Urban park
- Location: Fuchu, Tokyo, Japan
- Coordinates: 35°39′22″N 139°28′25″E
- Status: Open all year

Kyōdo-no-Mori or Native Forest (郷土の森博物館, Kyōdo-no-Mori Hakubutsukan) is an open-air folk museum in Fuchū, Tokyo. It features buildings of historical note from various times in Japanese history.
