= Tama-reien Station =

Railway station in Fuchū, Tokyo, Japan

Tama-reien Station 多磨霊園駅

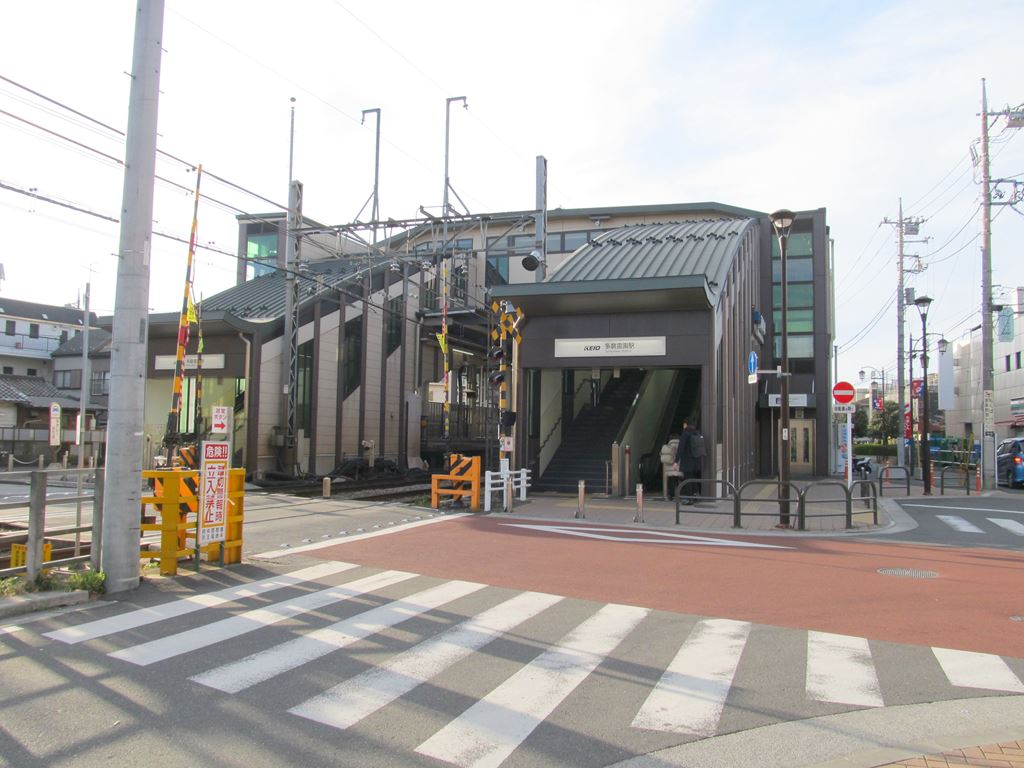
- Tama-reien Station, January 2017

General information
- Location: 3-26-11 Shimizugaoka, Fuchū-shi, Tokyo 183-0015; Japan
- Coordinates: 35°39′58″N 139°30′11.1″E
- Operator: Keio Corporation
- Line: Keio Line
- Distance: 19.6 km from Shinjuku
- Platforms: 2 side platforms
- Tracks: 2

Other information
- Station code: KO22
- Website: Official website

History
- Opened: November 31, 1916; 109 years ago
- Former names: Tama Station (to 1932); Shikoenbochi-mae Station (to 1937)

Passengers
- FY2019: 13,046 (daily)

Services
Preceding station	Keio Corporation	Following station
Higashi-fuchū towards Keiō-hachiōji	Keiō Line Rapid Local	Musashinodai towards Shinjuku
Location
- Location within Tokyo Location within Japan

Tama-reien Station (多磨霊園駅, Tama-Reien-eki) is a passenger railway station located in the city of Fuchū, Tokyo, Japan, operated by the private railway operator Keio Corporation.

== Lines ==
Tama-reien Station is served by the Keio Line, and is located 19.6 kilometers from the starting point of the line at Shinjuku Station.

== Station layout ==
This station consists of two opposed ground-level side platforms serving two tracks, with the station building located above and at a right angle to the tracks and platforms.

=== Platforms ===
1	Keiō Line	for Keiō-Hachiōji; Keiō Dōbutsuen Line for Tama-Dōbutsukōen (via Takahatafudō); Keiō Takao Line for Takaosanguchi (via Kitano)
2	Keiō Line	for Chōfu, Meidaimae, Sasazuka, and Shinjuku; Toei Shinjuku Line for Moto-Yawata

== History ==
The station opened on November 31, 1916, initially named Tama Station (多磨駅).On December 8, 1932 it was renamed Shikoenbochi-mae Station (市公園墓地前駅). It was renamed to its present name on May 1, 1937.

== Passenger statistics ==
In fiscal 2019, the station was used by an average of 13,046 passengers daily.

The passenger figures (boarding passengers only) for previous years are as shown below.

Fiscal year	daily average
2005	11,537
2010	11,633
2015	12,543

== Surrounding area ==
- Tama Cemetery

== See also ==
- List of railway stations in Japan
