= Tokyo Metropolitan Police Department =

Prefectural police department in Japan

Coordinates: 35°40′37″N 139°45′08″E

Tokyo Metropolitan Police Department 警視庁 Keishichō
- Asahikage

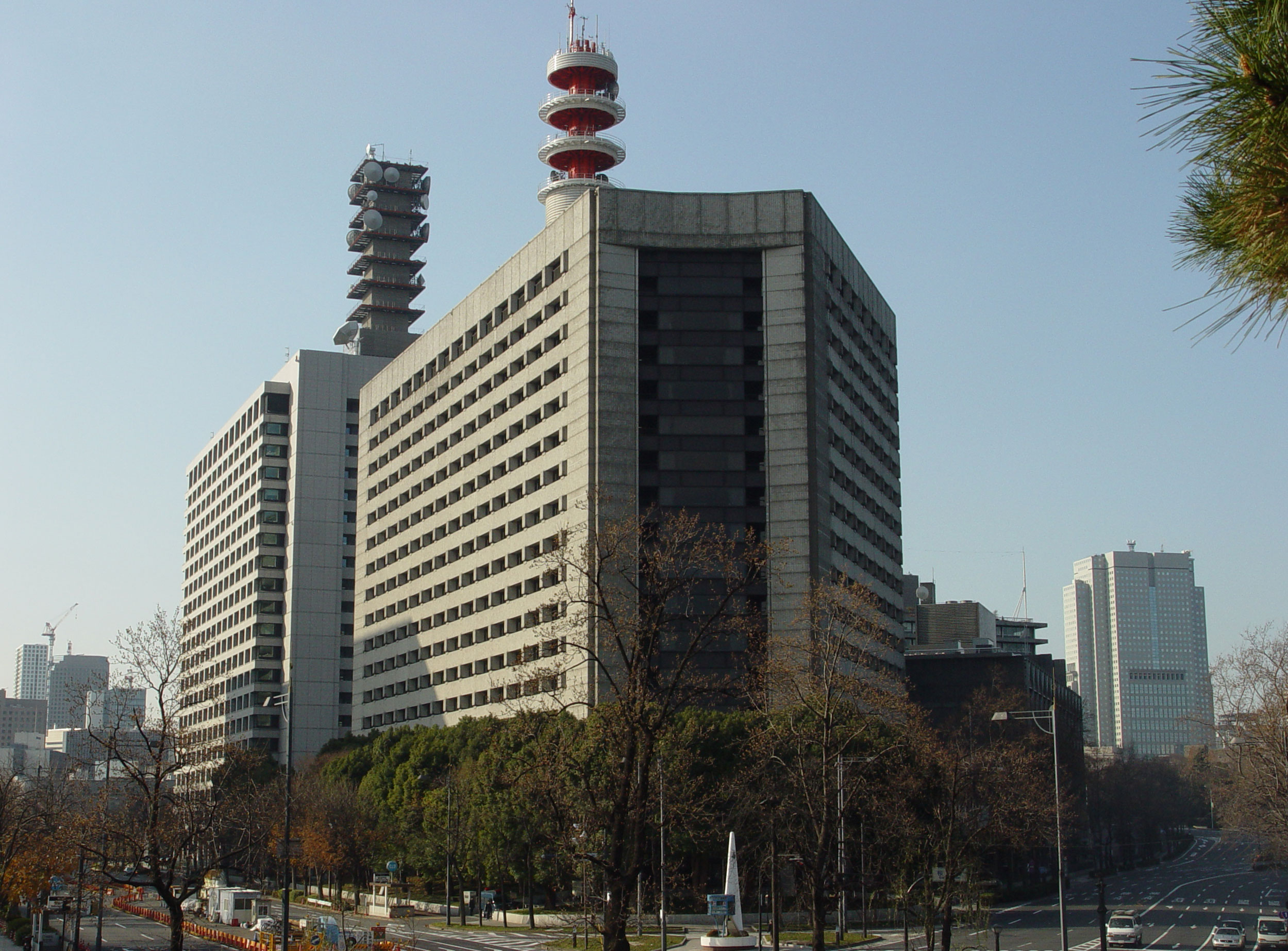
- Headquarters building

- Patch
- Abbreviation: TMPD

Agency overview
- Formed: 9 January 1874

Jurisdictional structure
- Operations jurisdiction: Tokyo, Kantō region, Japan
- Governing body: Tokyo Metropolitan Government
- General nature: Local civilian police

Operational structure
- Overseen by: Tokyo Metropolitan Public Safety Commission
- Headquarters: 1-1 Kasumigaseki 2-chome, Chiyoda-ku, Tokyo 100-8929
- Sworns: 43,566
- Police Administrative Civilians: 3,015
- Agency executive: Hiroki Tsutsui, Superintendent General
- Bureaus: 6: Administration; Personnel and Training; Traffic; Community Police Affairs; Security; Public Security; Criminal Investigation; Community Safety; Organized Crime Control

Facilities
- Stations: 102
- Patrol Cars: 1292
- Motorcycles: 958
- Security boats: 22
- Helicopters: 14
- Dogs: 36
- Horses: 16

Website
- Tokyo Metropolitan Police Department (in Japanese); Tokyo Metropolitan Police Department (in English)

The Tokyo Metropolitan Police Department (TMPD) (警視庁, Keishichō), known locally as simply the Metropolitan Police Department (MPD), is the prefectural police of Tokyo Metropolis, Japan. Founded in 1874, the TMPD is the largest police force in Japan by number of officers, with a staff of more than 40,000 police officers and over 2,800 civilian personnel.

The TMPD is headed by a Superintendent-General, who is appointed by the National Public Safety Commission and approved by the prime minister. It manages 10 divisions and 102 stations across the Metropolis.

The TMPD's headquarters are located in Kasumigaseki, Chiyoda, Tokyo. Built in 1980, it is 18 stories tall, and is a large wedge-shaped building with a cylindrical tower. The HQ building is located opposite of Sakurada Gate of Tokyo Imperial Palace, which is the reason why it is metonymically called "Sakurada Gate".

== History ==
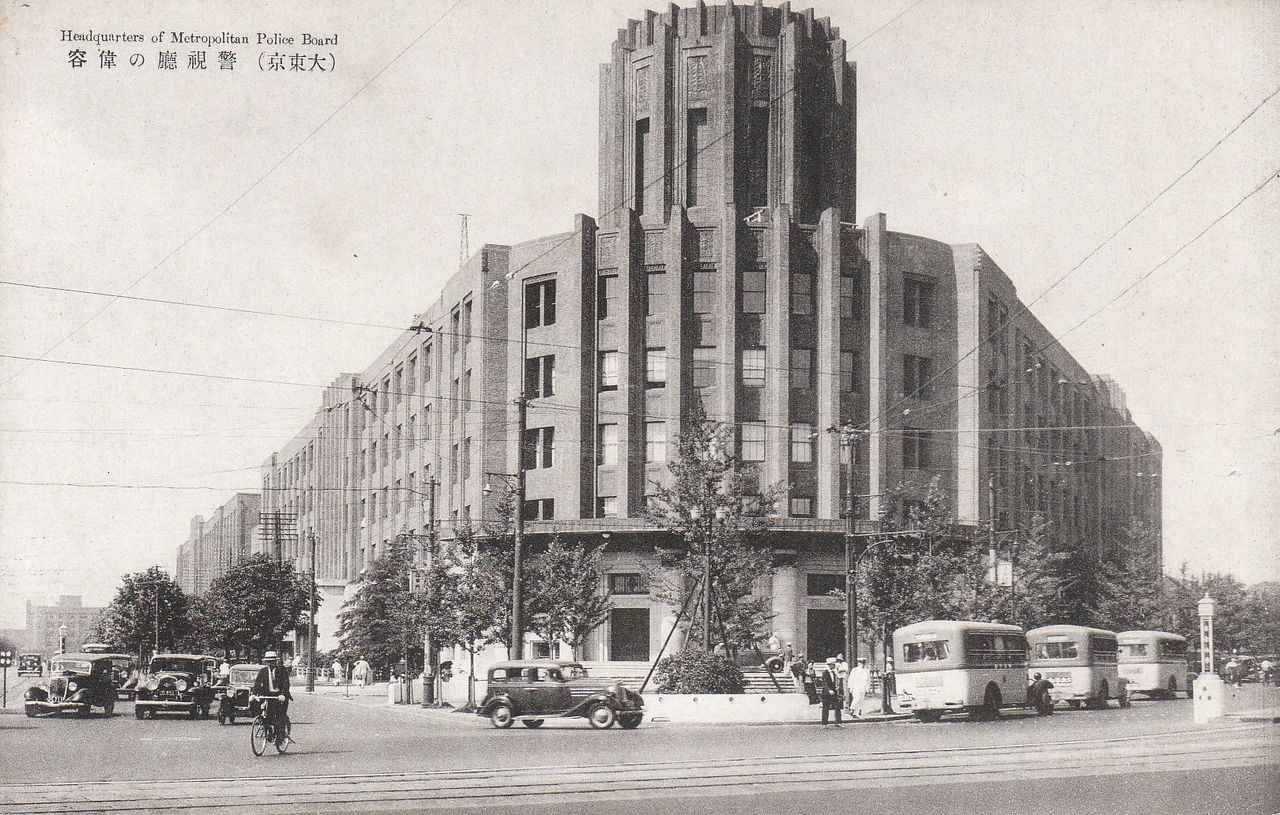
Tokyo Metropolitan Police Headquarters in 1931

The TMPD was established by Japanese statesman Kawaji Toshiyoshi in 1874. Kawaji, who had helped establish the earlier rasotsu in 1871 following the disestablishment of the Edo period police system, was part of the Iwakura Mission to Europe, where he gathered information on Western policing; he was mostly inspired by the police of France, especially the National Gendarmerie on which the rasotsu were based. On 9 January 1874, the TMPD was established as part of the Home Ministry, with Kawaji serving as its first Superintendent-General.

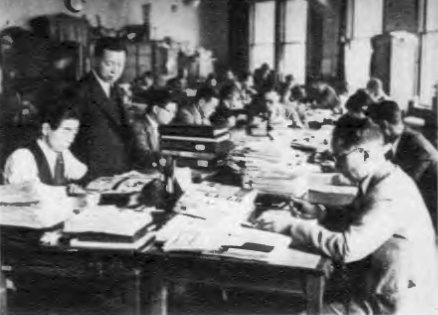
TMPD officers in charge of censorship duties in 1938

By the 1880s, the police had developed into a nationwide instrument of government control, and their increasing involvement in political affairs was one of the foundations of the authoritarian state in the Empire of Japan during the first half of the 20th century. By the 1920s and 1930s, police across Japan, including the TMPD, were responsible not only for law enforcement and public security, but also firefighting, labor dispute mediation, censorship, upholding public morality, issuing permits, and government regulation of businesses, construction, and public health.

When Japan surrendered at the end of World War II, the TMPD was placed under Allied control in occupied Japan. The Supreme Commander for the Allied Powers viewed the existing Japanese police system as undemocratic and sought to reform it, so in 1947 the Old Police Law (旧警察法, Kyū keisatsu-hō) was passed, decentralizing Japanese police and reorganizing them into municipal police and rural police; as a municipal police force, the TMPD was limited to the 23 wards of Tokyo, but the "Metropolitan" part of the name remained. Police firefighting duties were also split off to independent fire departments, with the TMPD's Fire Bureau developing into the Tokyo Fire Department in 1948. However, issues concerning manpower and efficiency among smaller and spread out municipalities arose, so in 1954 the amended Police Law (警察法, Keisatsu-hō) was passed, reunifying the police into prefectural divisions under the National Police Agency; as part of the amendment, the TMPD regained jurisdiction over the Tokyo metropolitan area.

In 2017, the TMPD established the Cyber Attack Countermeasures Center, consisting of 100 officers from the Cyber Attack Special Investigation Unit, originally from the PSB.

To prepare for the G20 summit in 2019, the TMPD announced the establishment of the Water Response Team in order to police bodies of water near G20 summit venues.

In response to concerns raised by the Okawahara Kakoki Incident, the PSB created the Public Security Investigation and Guidance Office through the Public Security and General Affairs Division.

On June 1, 2025, the TMPD is planning to merge the Criminal Investigation Bureau and the Organized Crime Control Bureau in order to ensure the officers in the bureaus do their job effectively.

=== Scandals ===
In 1978, the TMPD was investigated when a uniformed officer killed a female university student inside her residence.

In 1997, an officer was caught falsifying evidence in an amphetamine investigation.

In 2007, the TMPD was under scrutiny after a serving officer used his officially-issued firearm to commit a murder–suicide.

In 2014, the chief of Kamata Police Station in Ōta was disciplined after a police officer assigned there committed suicide following severe workplace harassment.

In 2024, an investigation found that police departments across Japan, including Tokyo, have a high rate of systematic racial profiling against foreigners, such as South Asians and Brazilians, despite previously low records of racial profiling incidents.

== Organization ==
The TMPD is under the command of a Superintendent-General and reports directly to the Tokyo Metropolitan Public Safety Commission. The Superintendent-General can be appointed and replaced at any time as long as the prime minister and the TMPSC receives their approval.

Since the TMPD is autonomous, it does not operate under the authority of any Regional Police Bureau.

The TMPD has nine bureaus that report to the Deputy Superintendent General:

- Administration Bureau (総務部)
- Personnel and Training Bureau (警務部)
- Traffic Bureau (交通部)
- Community Police Affairs Bureau (地域部)
- Security Bureau (警備部)
- Public Security Bureau (公安部)
- Criminal Investigation Bureau (刑事部)
- Community Safety Bureau (生活安全部)
- Organized Crime Control Bureau (組織犯罪対策部)

The TMPD also operates its own academy, the Metropolitan Police Academy.

== Ranks and insignia ==
The ranks used in the TMPD have been slightly revised in 2013, changing only the English translation of some of the ranks used by the force.

Otherwise, these ranks have been observed throughout its history. (Note that Deputy Superintendent-General is, strictly speaking, a post rather than a rank).

- Superintendent-General (four gold rising suns)
- Deputy Superintendent-General (post gold-wreathed gold emblem with three gold bars) (Note: Not observed from TMPD websites/books as of 2018)
- Senior Commissioner (gold-wreathed gold emblem with three gold bars), formerly Superintendent Supervisor (Note: Minor adaptions were made by the TMPD in 2013.)
- Commissioner (gold-wreathed gold emblem with two gold bars), formerly Chief Superintendent
- Assistant Commissioner (gold-wreathed gold emblem with one gold bar), formerly Senior Superintendent
- Superintendent (gold-wreathed silver emblem with three gold bars)
- Chief Inspector (gold-wreathed silver emblem with two gold bars), formerly Inspector
- Inspector (gold-wreathed silver emblem with one gold bar), formerly Assistant Inspector
- Sergeant (silver-wreathed silver emblem with three gold bars)
- Senior Police Officer (silver-wreathed silver emblem with two gold bars)
- Police Officer (silver-wreathed silver emblem with one gold bar)

== Gallery ==
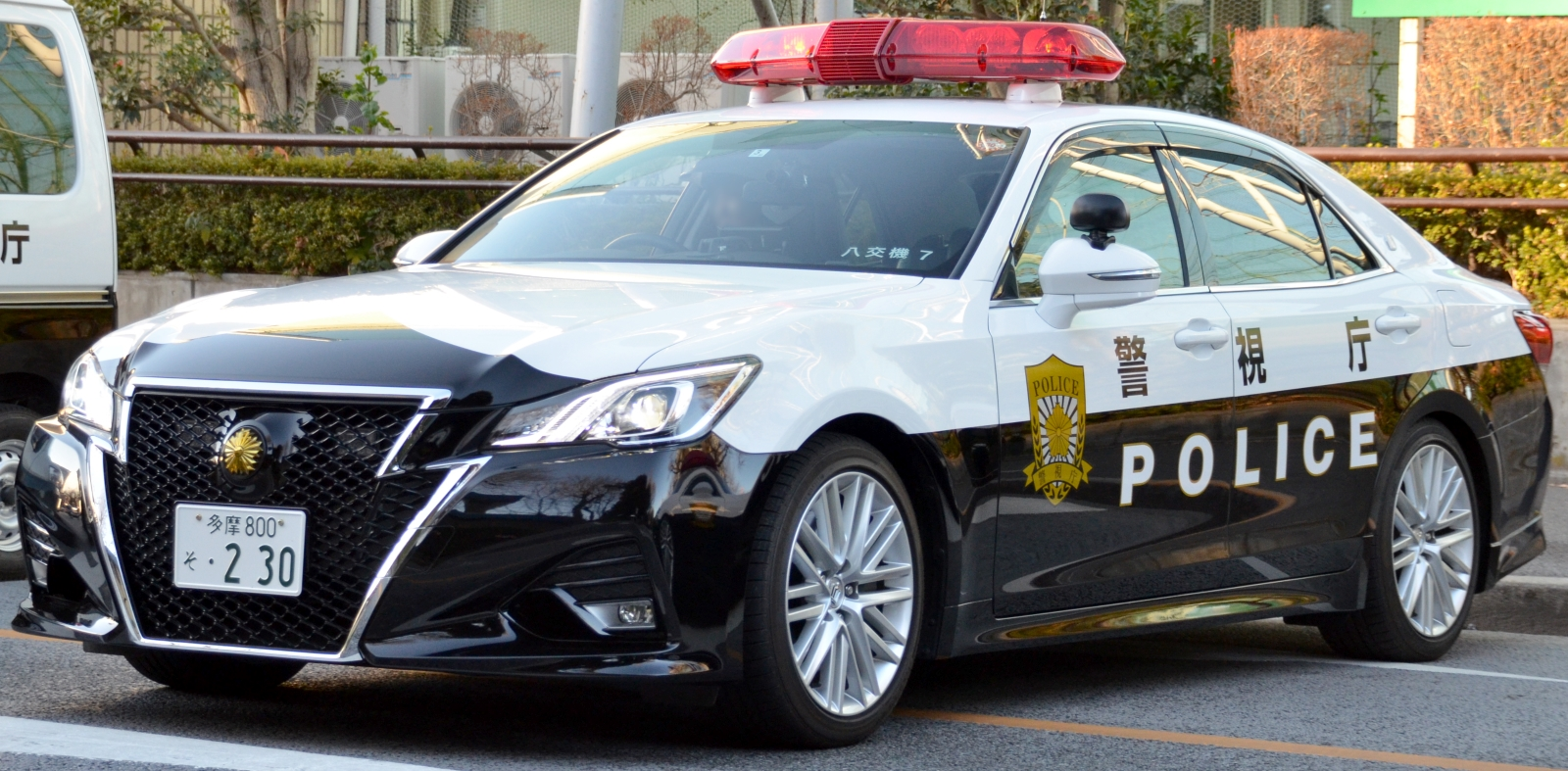
Toyota Crown assigned to traffic duty in Tachikawa

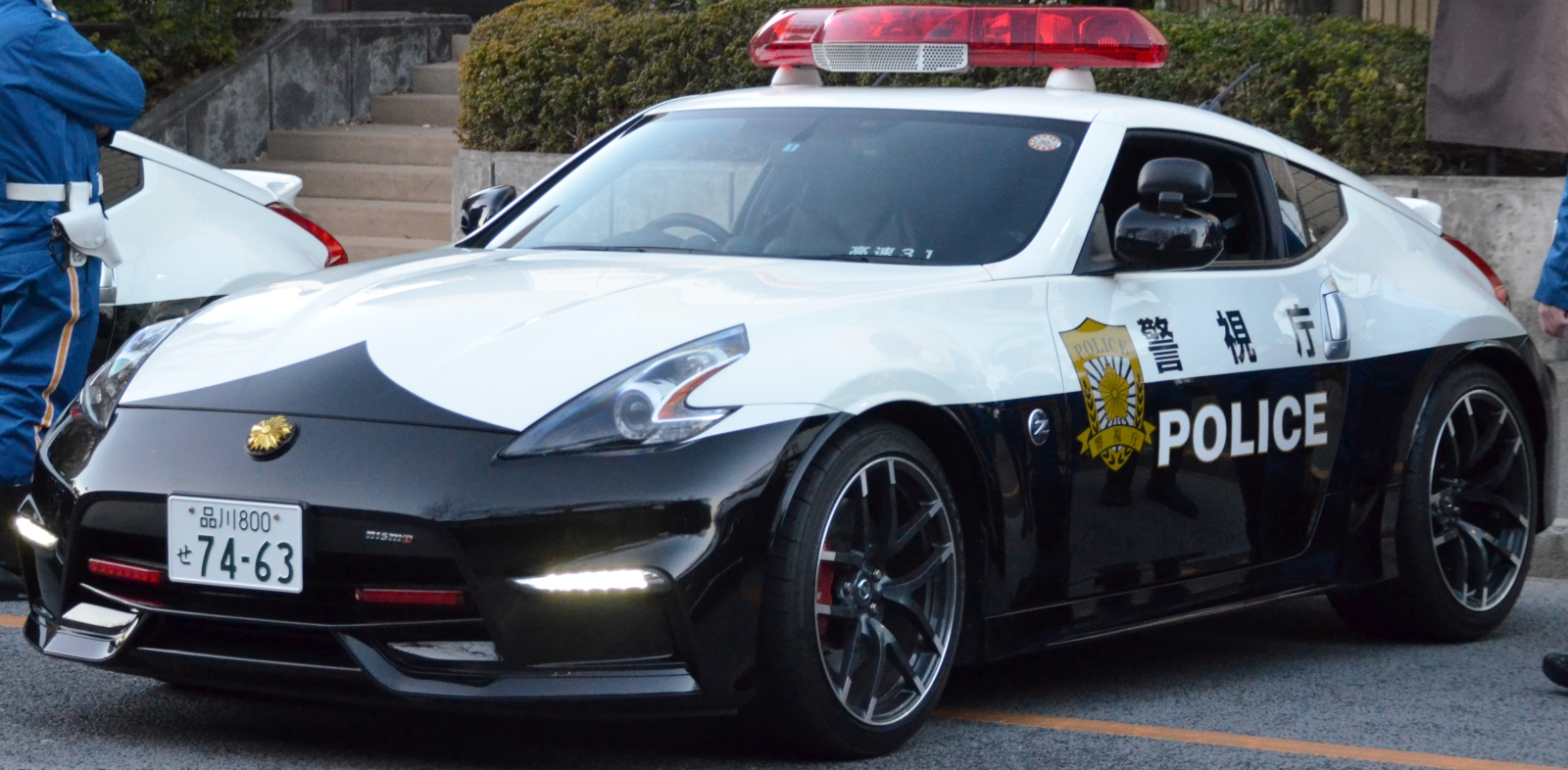
Nissan Fairlady Z NISMO Z34 used for highway patrol

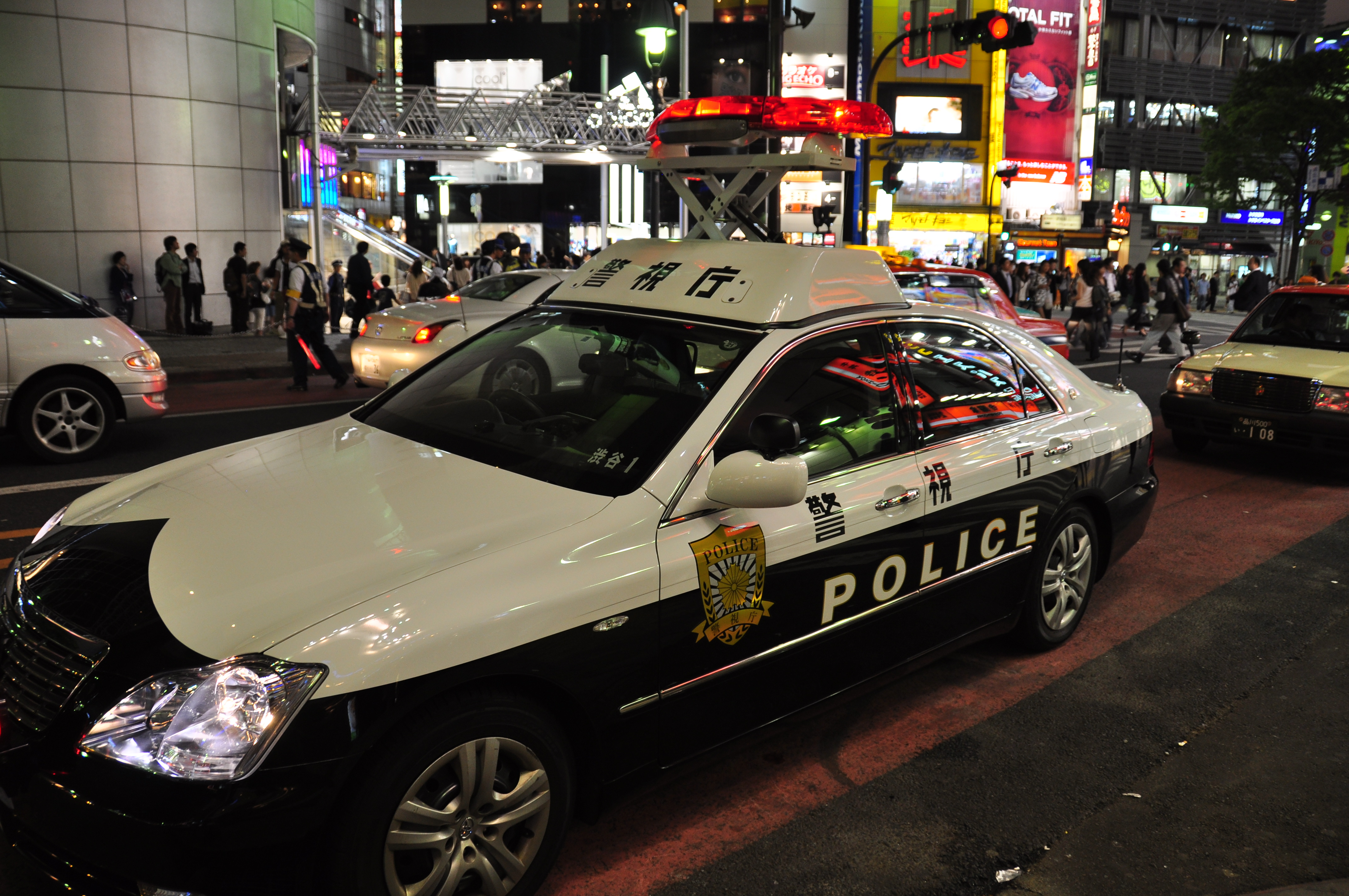
Toyota Crown with a raised lightbar in Shibuya

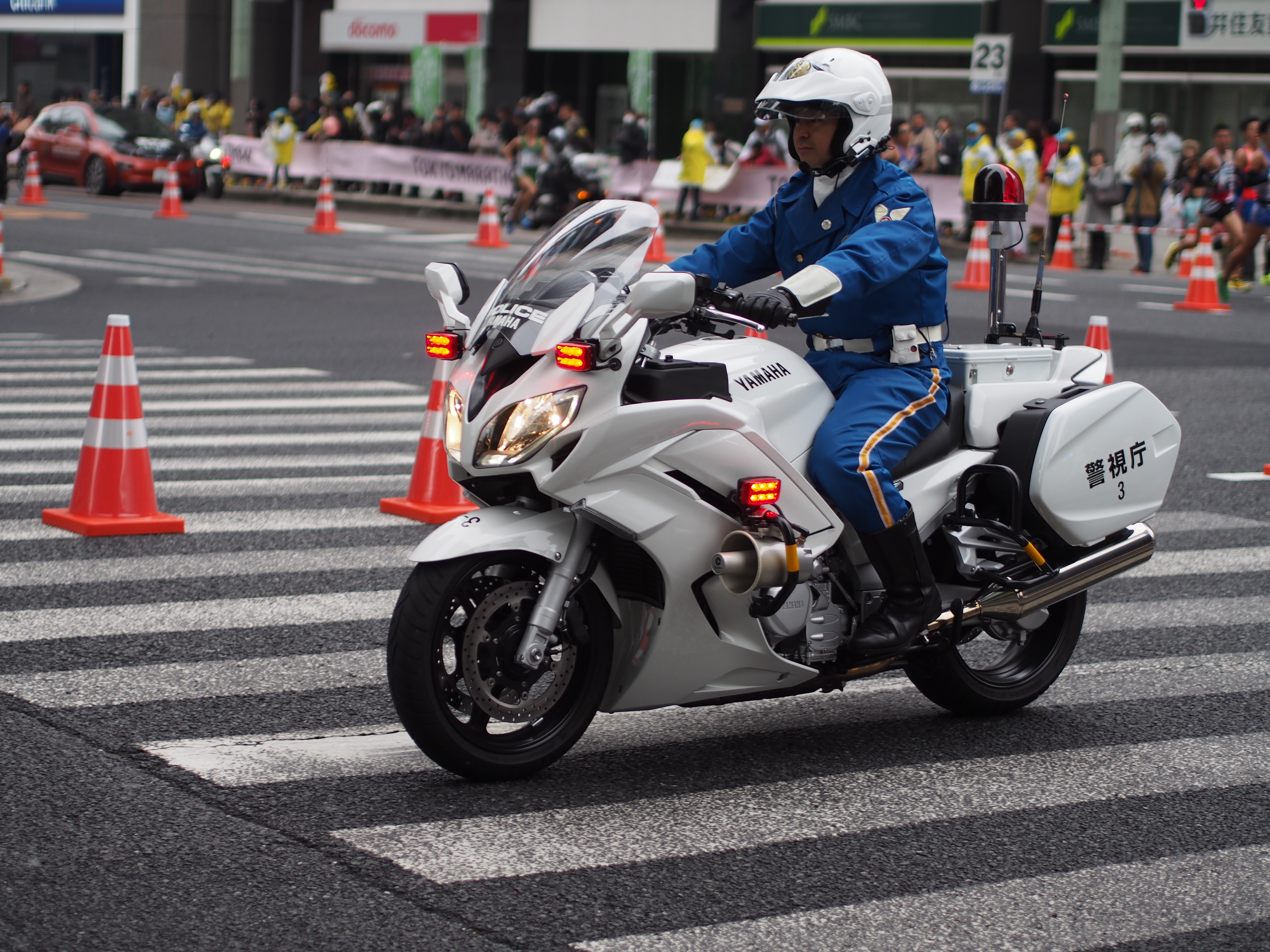
Yamaha FJR1300 escorting the 2015 Tokyo Marathon

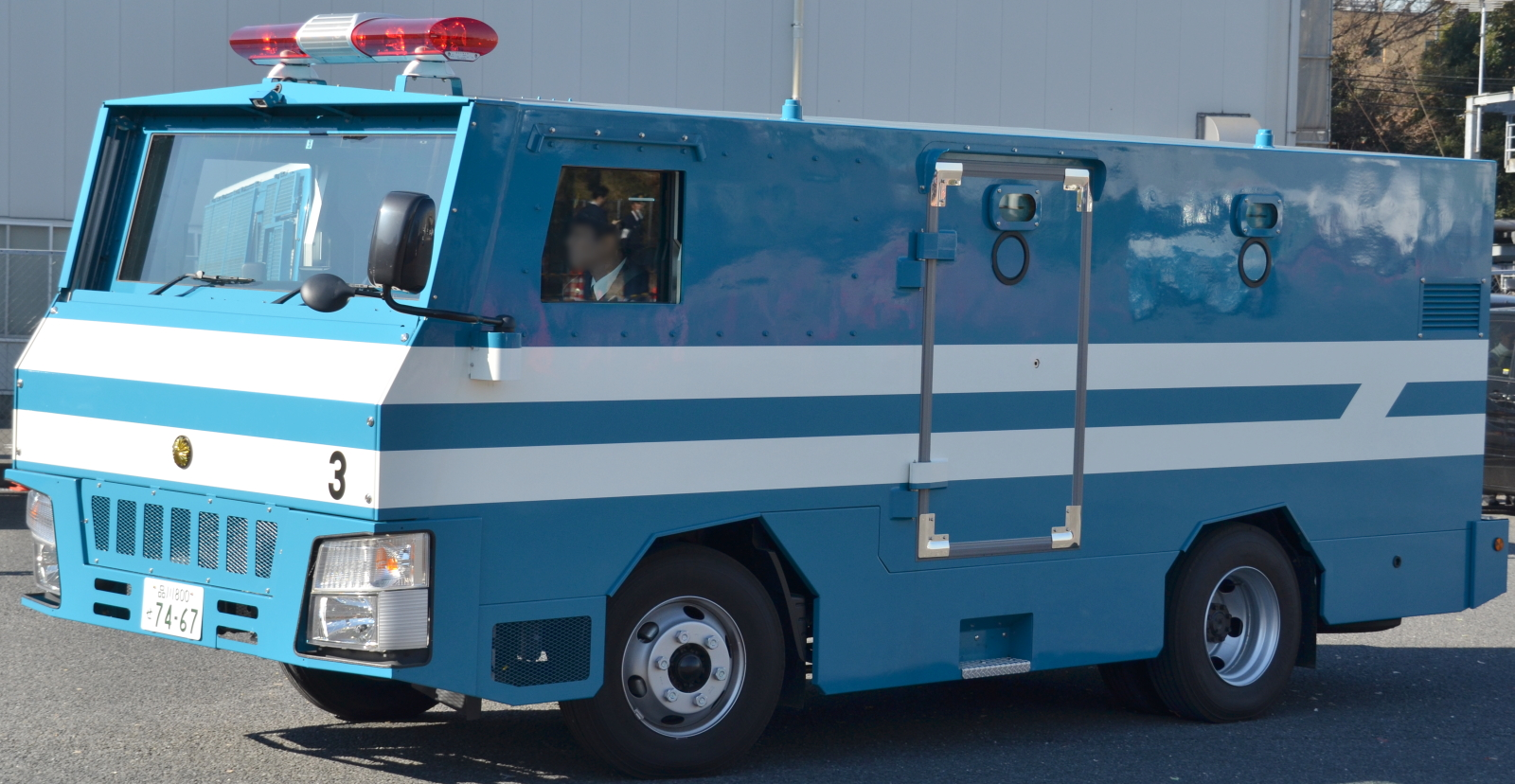
Mitsubishi Fuso Canter converted into an internal security vehicle for use by the TMPD's Riot Police Unit

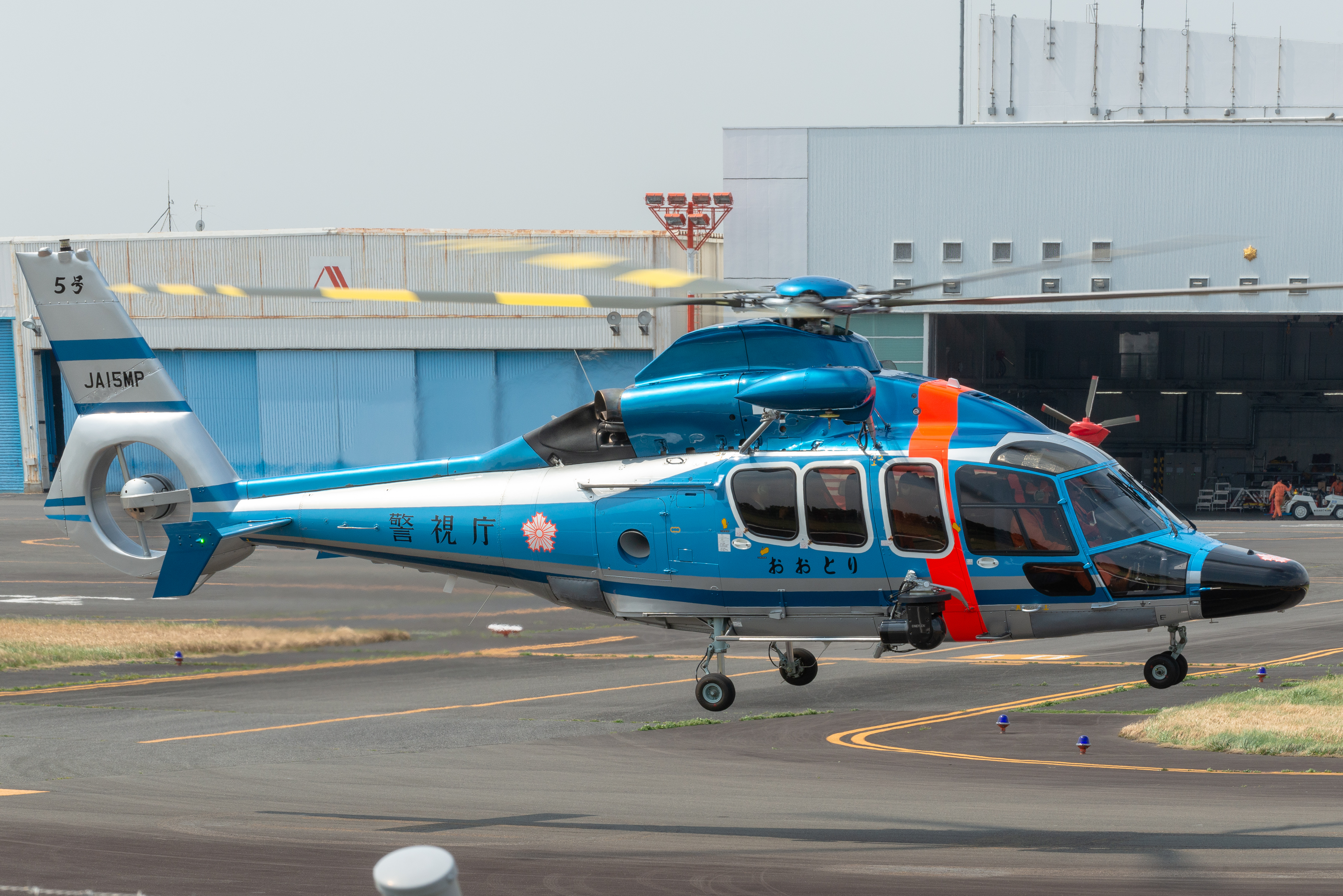
Eurocopter EC155 used by the TMPD at Tokyo Heliport

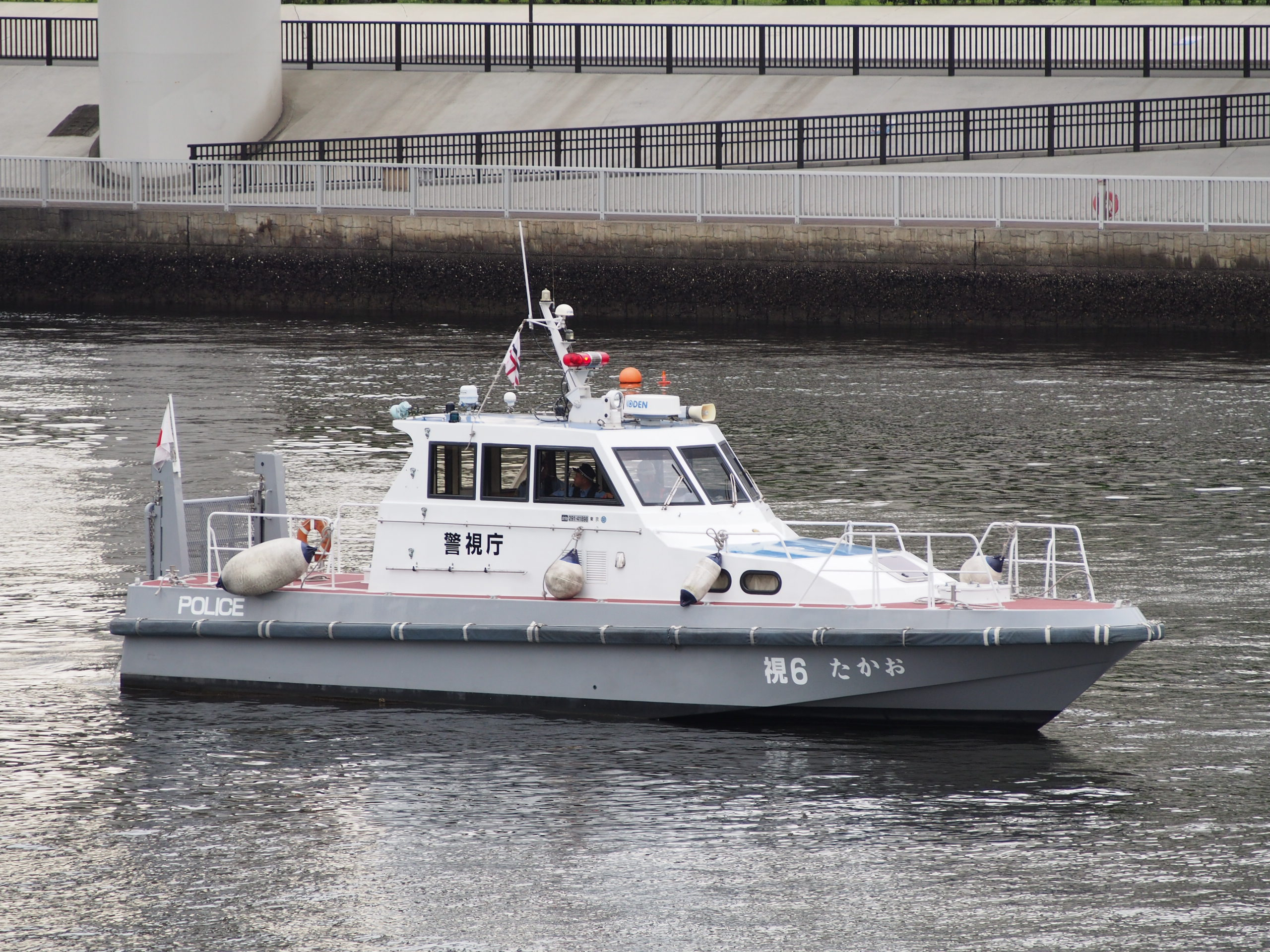
TMPD Boat Takao in Ariake

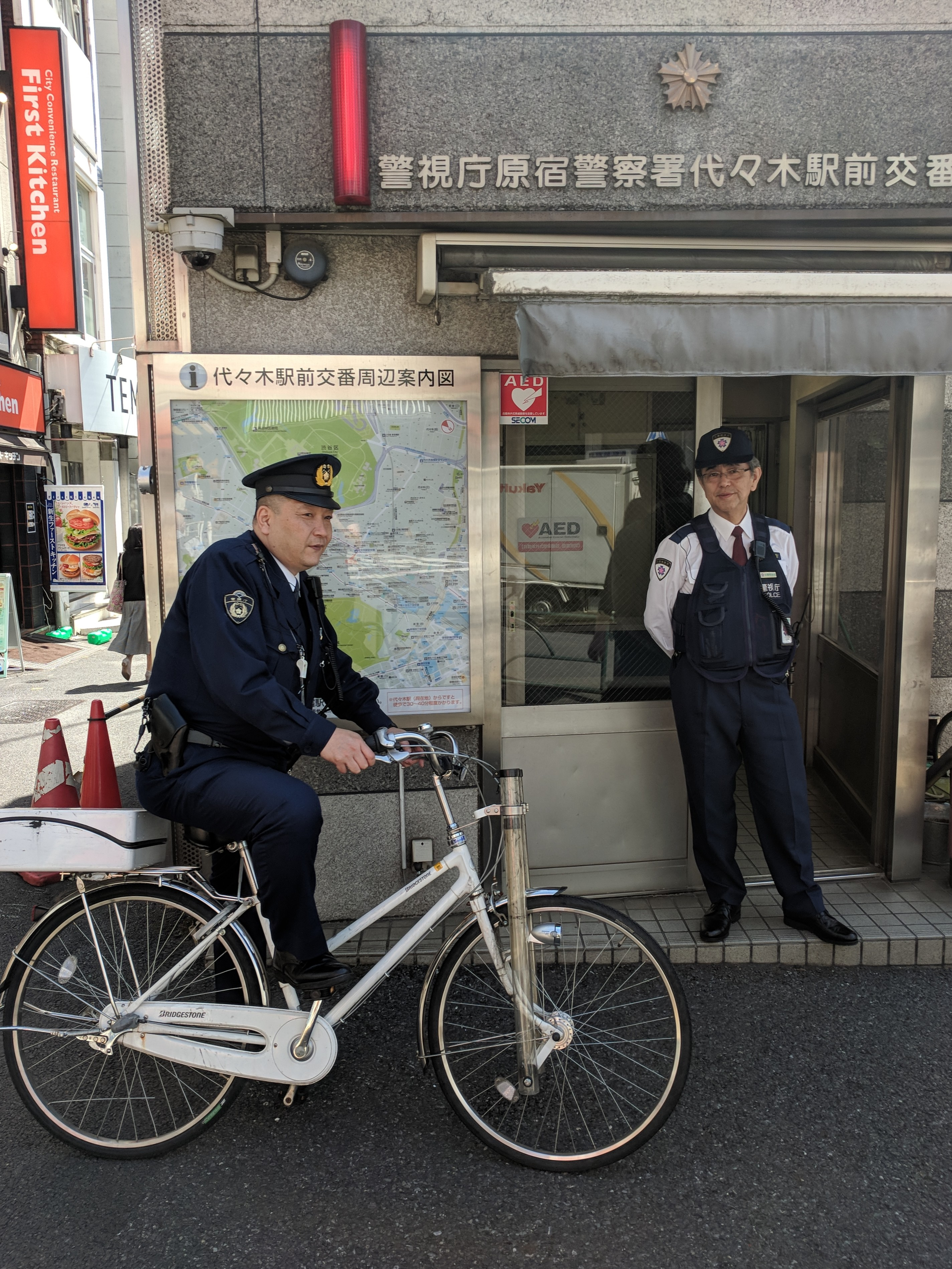
TMPD officers outside a kōban near Shibuya Station

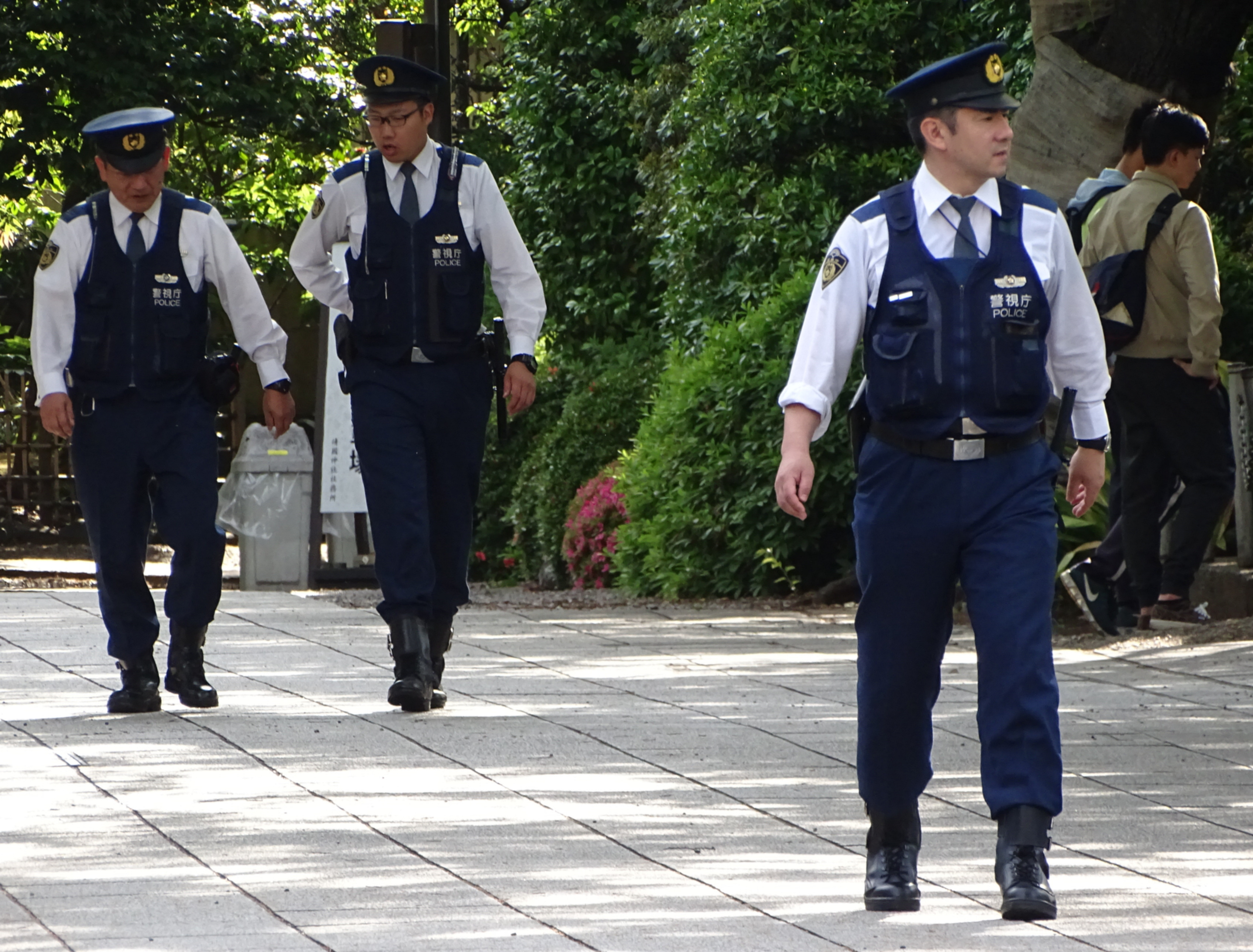
TMPD patrol officers outside Yasukuni Shrine

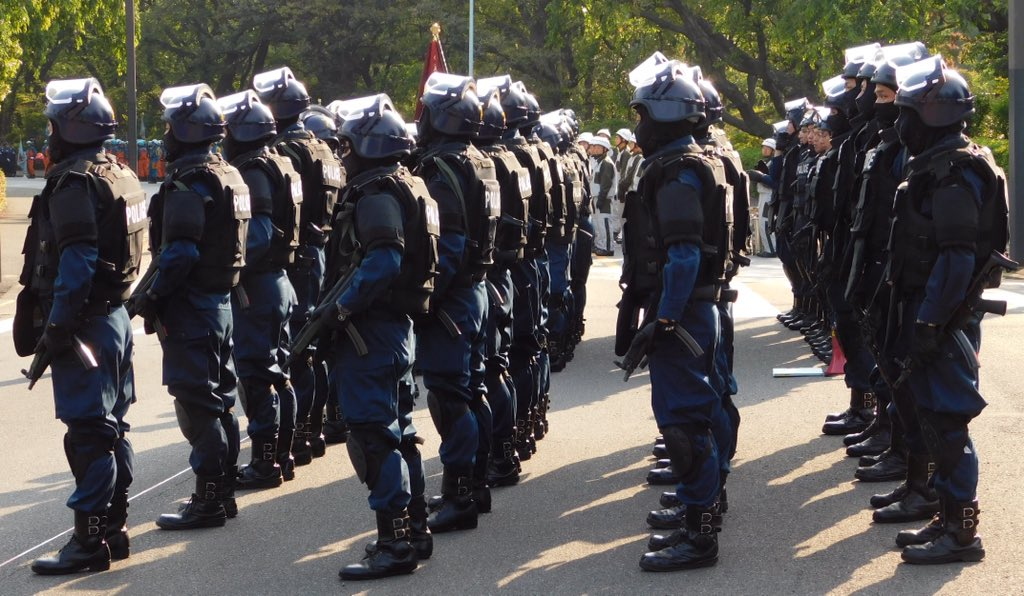
TMPD Riot Police Unit Emergency Response Team officers with their equipment

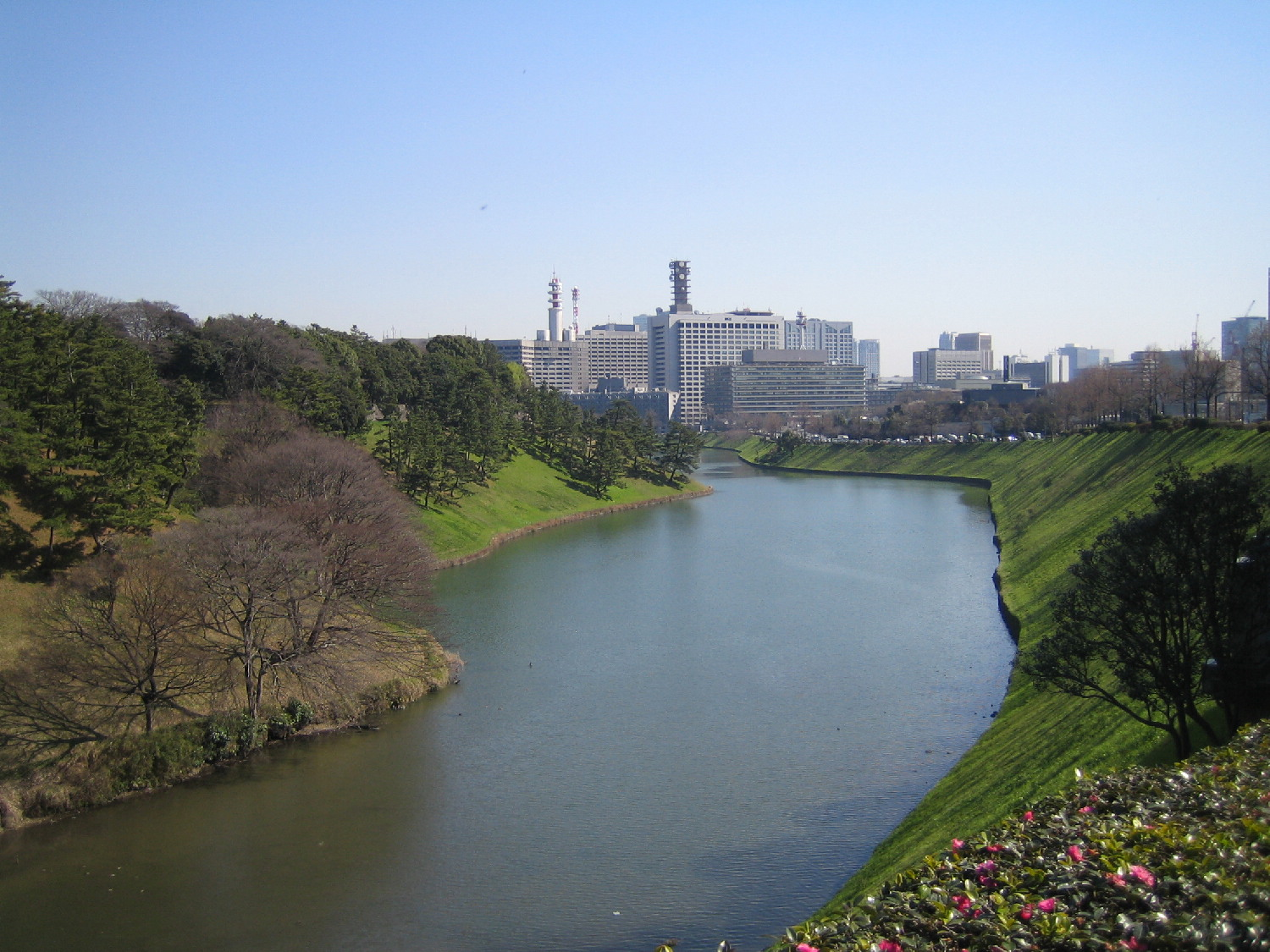
TMPD HQ seen from Tokyo Imperial Palace

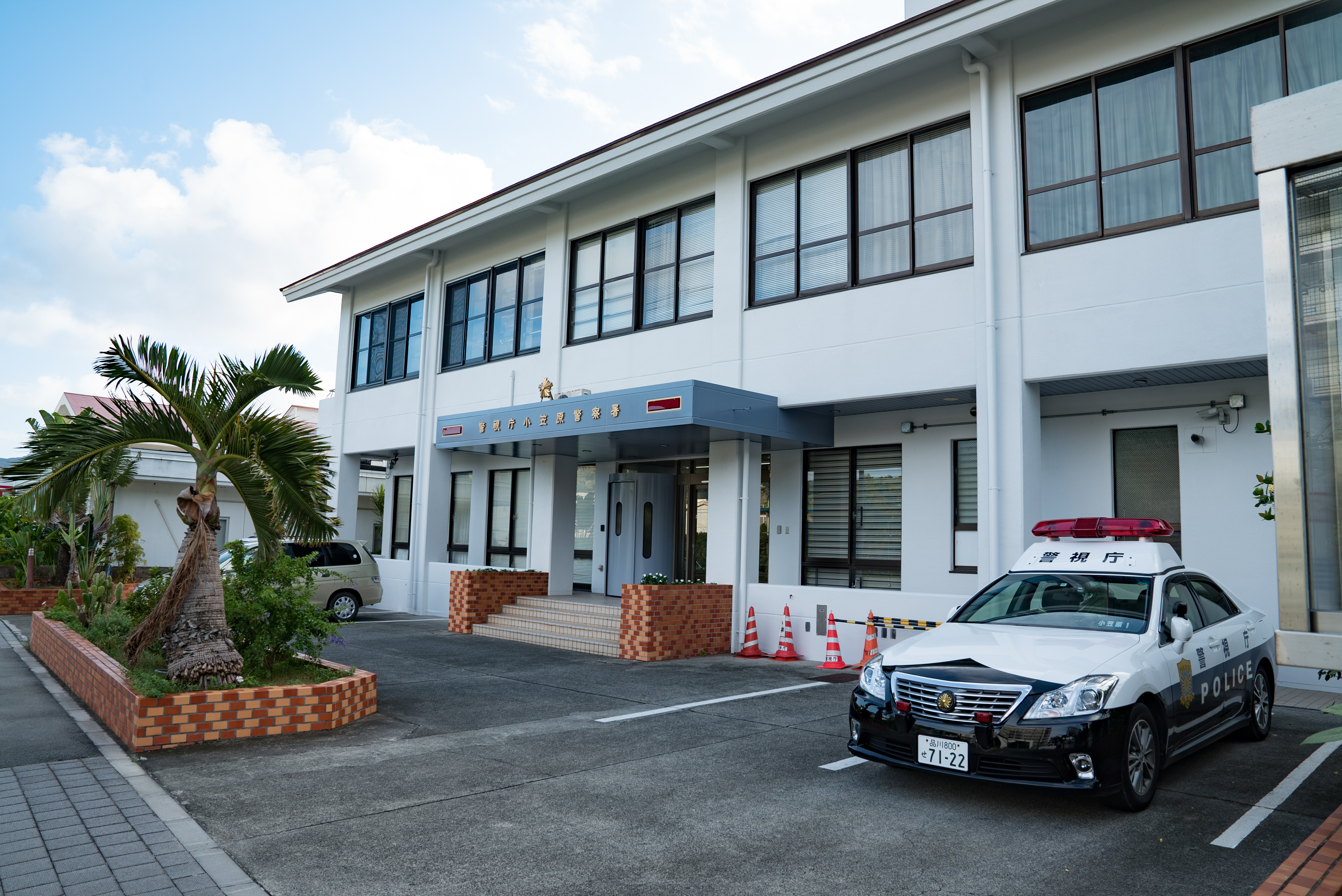
The police station in Ogasawara, about 1,000 kilometres (620 mi) away from HQ

== See also ==
- Security Police (Japan)
- Prefectural police
