= Utagaki =

Ancient Japanese Shinto ritual gathering

Utagaki (歌垣), also read kagai (嬥歌), was an ancient Japanese Shinto ritual gathering. Villagers would meet on a mountaintop, where singing, dancing, eating, having free sexual intercourse and the reciting of poetry would occur, in celebration of the beginning of spring or autumn. These events were closely associated with harvest rites, and therefore fertility.

== Etymology ==
The word utagaki might come from different kanji, 歌掛き, a shortening of uta o kakeru ("song gathering" or "song presentation"). Kagai is a synonym used in the Tohoku dialect, possibly related to kakeai ("lyric contest").

== History ==
Utagaki seems to have its originated in the Kofun period, around the reign of Emperor Kenzo, but it reached its height during the Nara period (710-794). The festival and its traits are detailed in the Man'yōshū, the Fudoki and other chronicles from ancient Japanese literature. Its origin might be tied to those of the festivals of kunimi and hanami.

On the Mountains of Tsukuba
where the eagles dwell
Near the Wells of Mohakitsu,
Seeking each other, in song of Kagai
I will seek the wives of other men
And let other men woo my own.
The gods dwelling in these mountains
Have allowed this
Since olden times;
Do not make an exception today
And do not reproach the lovers
And blame then not.

— Mushimaro Takahashi, Man'yōshū

The festival celebrated fertility and the cycle of crop and harvest, and it was hosted biannually on the seasonal transitions. Localized variations abounded, though most of them featured the offering of ritual sexual activity to the local gods, allowed on this occasion by the temporal abolishment of social norm about marriage and decorum. Utagaki was meant to increase both female fertility and male virility with the blessing of the deities, bringing prosperity to villages and their inhabitants. Though celebrated by peasants, utagaki was a prestigious ritual, to the point there are records of both Emperor Shomu and his daughter Empress Shotoku visiting gatherings to offer gifts.

Utakagi took the shape of feasts on mountaintops, where poetry and songs were exchanged between participants in a contest meant to seduce suitors. Mount Tsukuba in Ibaraki prefecture was an especially popular place of meeting, attracting people from all the Kanto region. Some Shinto shrines served as places for sexual encounters, which became Oita prefecture. In other regions, like Ibaraki and Aichi, the feasts included a parade or ritual dance (kagura) after which it was given license to maintain sexual relationships.

Despite its breaking of social etiquette, utagaki contained its own rules. Women were allowed to reject or accept any suitor, though there was sometimes the only condition of accepting at least three of them. The festival granted unmarried people a chance to find partners outside their villages, and couples in love an excuse to have encounters. Conceiving illegitimate offspring during utagaki was not considered dishonorable, though it carried the same obligations.

In 798, during the reign of Emperor Kanmu, night festivals (yo-matsuri) were banned due to their excessive unruliness, but utagaki itself survived through the centuries, eventually being syncretized with the ullambana festival from Amitabha Buddhism. Its true suppression would come with the Meiji restoration. In spite of this, remnants of the tradition remain in the Izu and Ryukyu islands, although divested from its sexual overtones.

== See also ==
- Kurayami matsuri
