= Fuchū, Tokyo =

Fuchū 府中市
- City
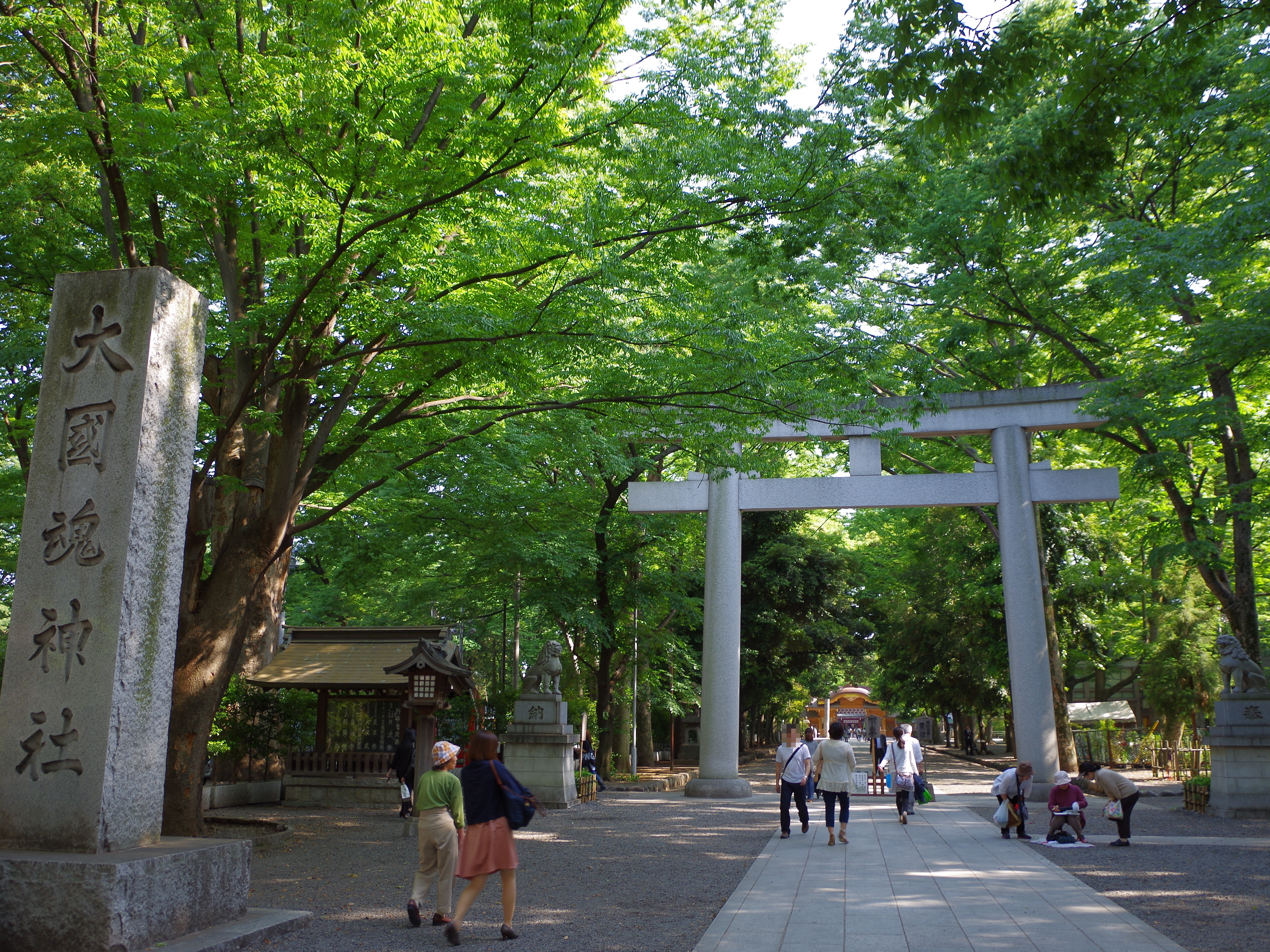
- Approach to the Ōkunitama Shrine, Fūchu

- Flag Seal

- Location of Fuchū in Tokyo Prefecture

- Coordinates: 35°40′8.2″N 139°28′39.5″E
- Country: Japan
- Region: Kantō
- Prefecture: Tokyo
- First official recorded: 111 AD
- Town settled: April 1, 1893
- City settled: April 1, 1954

Government
  - Mayor: Norio Takano (from February 2012)

Area
  - Total: 29.43 km^{2} (11.36 sq mi)

Population (August 2025)
  - Total: 264,534
  - Density: 8,989/km^{2} (23,280/sq mi)
- Time zone: UTC+9 (Japan Standard Time)
- Phone number: 042-364-4111
- Address: 2-24 MiyaNishi-machi, Fuchū-shi, Tokyo 183-8703
- Climate: Cfa
- Website: Official website
- Symbols
- Bird: Skylark
- Flower: Ume
- Tree: Keyaki

Fuchū City Hall

Fuchū (府中市, Fuchū-shi) is a city located in the western portion of the Tokyo Metropolis, Japan. Fuchū serves as a regional commercial center and a commuter town for workers in central Tokyo. The city hosts large scale manufacturing facilities for Toshiba, NEC and Suntory, as well as the Bank of Japan's main computer operations center. Local sporting attractions include the Tokyo Racecourse and the training grounds of Top League rugby teams Toshiba Brave Lupus and Suntory Sungoliath.

As of 1 August 2025, the city had an estimated population of 264,534, and a population density of 8,989 persons per square kilometer. The total area of the city is 29.43 square kilometres (11.36 sq mi).

== Geography ==
Fuchū is located about 20 km west of the centre of Tokyo. Using the Keiō Line from Shinjuku, it is 25 minutes to Fuchū Station (main station). It spreads across the Musashino Terrace on the left bank of the Tama River, facing the Tama hills on the opposite shore. The Tama River flows through the southernmost end of the city from west to east. The Kokubunji cliff runs west to east along the north; the Fuchū cliff runs west to east through the center of the city. The former has a height of 10 to 15 m, and the latter, 10 to 20 m. Sengenyama with an altitude of 79 m is in the northeast part, and the height from the foot is about 30 m. The region is mostly flatland. To the south of the Fuchū cliff is the Tama River lowlands while to the north of the Kokubunji cliff is the Musashino side of Musashino Plateau; the region between is the Tachikawa side of the Musashino Plateau. The cliffs are called hake in the local dialect. The Nogawa River, a tributary of the Tama River, grazes the northeast end of the city.

=== Surrounding municipalities ===
Tokyo Metropolis:

- Chōfu
- Hino
- Inagi
- Koganei
- Kokubunji
- Kunitachi
- Tama

=== Climate ===
Fuchū has a humid subtropical climate (Köppen Cfa) characterized by warm summers and cool winters with light to no snowfall. The average annual temperature in Fuchū is 14.0 °C. The average annual rainfall is 1,647 mm with September as the wettest month. The temperatures are highest on average in August, at around 25.5 °C, and lowest in January, at around 2.6 °C. The highest temperature ever recorded in Fuchu was 40.0 °C (104.0 °F) on 5 August 2025.

Climate data for Fuchū, Tokyo (1991−2020 normals, extremes 1976−present)
Month	Jan	Feb	Mar	Apr	May	Jun	Jul	Aug	Sep	Oct	Nov	Dec	Year
Record high °C (°F)	19.4 (66.9)	24.2 (75.6)	28.6 (83.5)	32.0 (89.6)	33.5 (92.3)	36.9 (98.4)	39.3 (102.7)	40.0 (104.0)	38.5 (101.3)	32.4 (90.3)	26.5 (79.7)	25.3 (77.5)	40.0 (104.0)
Mean daily maximum °C (°F)	9.9 (49.8)	10.8 (51.4)	14.0 (57.2)	19.2 (66.6)	23.7 (74.7)	26.3 (79.3)	30.3 (86.5)	31.6 (88.9)	27.6 (81.7)	22.1 (71.8)	16.9 (62.4)	12.2 (54.0)	20.4 (68.7)
Daily mean °C (°F)	4.5 (40.1)	5.4 (41.7)	8.8 (47.8)	13.9 (57.0)	18.5 (65.3)	21.8 (71.2)	25.7 (78.3)	26.8 (80.2)	23.1 (73.6)	17.5 (63.5)	11.8 (53.2)	6.8 (44.2)	15.4 (59.7)
Mean daily minimum °C (°F)	−0.7 (30.7)	0.3 (32.5)	3.7 (38.7)	8.7 (47.7)	13.8 (56.8)	18.1 (64.6)	22.2 (72.0)	23.2 (73.8)	19.5 (67.1)	13.5 (56.3)	7.1 (44.8)	1.6 (34.9)	10.9 (51.6)
Record low °C (°F)	−8.4 (16.9)	−8.2 (17.2)	−6.5 (20.3)	−1.6 (29.1)	4.0 (39.2)	10.5 (50.9)	13.5 (56.3)	15.7 (60.3)	8.6 (47.5)	2.3 (36.1)	−2.8 (27.0)	−7.2 (19.0)	−8.4 (16.9)
Average precipitation mm (inches)	56.9 (2.24)	52.4 (2.06)	113.8 (4.48)	121.9 (4.80)	133.1 (5.24)	166.6 (6.56)	164.2 (6.46)	173.4 (6.83)	246.7 (9.71)	228.0 (8.98)	83.2 (3.28)	58.7 (2.31)	1,598.9 (62.95)
Average precipitation days (≥ 1.0 mm)	4.9	5.2	9.1	9.2	10.6	12.5	11.9	9.7	11.8	10.4	7.1	5.1	107.5
Mean monthly sunshine hours	201.3	178.2	179.1	180.3	179.6	123.6	148.1	178.0	130.2	138.0	158.2	182.0	1,986.2
Source: JMA

== Demographics ==
Per Japanese census data, the population of Fuchū increased rapidly in the mid-20th century and has continued to grow at a slower pace in the decades since.

Historical population
Year	Pop.	±%
1950	45,342	—
1960	82,098	+81.1%
1970	163,173	+98.8%
1980	192,198	+17.8%
1990	209,396	+8.9%
2000	226,769	+8.3%
2010	255,506	+12.7%
2020	262,790	+2.9%

== History ==
The government of ancient Musashi Province was established in Fuchū by the Taika Reform, and the city prospered as the local center of politics, economy, and culture. It prospered as a post town on the Kōshū Kaidō highway in the Edo period, and the Kita Tama District public office was placed here after the start of the Meiji era.

- 645: With the Taika Reforms of the government of Musashi Province was established in Fuchū.
- 1333: The Battle of Bubaigawara was fought.
- 1602: The Fuchū post-town was established with the upgrading of the Kōshū-dochu road (Kōshū Highway).
- 1868: Nirayama Prefecture was established, and the southwest part of the city region becomes part of it. The remainder was under the jurisdiction of the Musashi prefectural governor.
- 1869: Shinagawa Prefecture was established, and except for the southwest part, the city becomes part of the prefecture.
- 1871: Establishment of the prefectural system. Parts of the city were transferred to Kanagawa Prefecture by the next year step by step.
- 1878: Tama District of Kanagawa Prefecture was divided into three districts: North Tama, South Tama, West Tama, and one district in Tokyo Prefecture: East Tama. The city region became part of North Tama District, whose district offices were established in the city.
- 1880: Four towns and one village of the central area of the city region merged into Fuchū-eki.
- 1889: Eight villages of the eastern area of city region merged into Tama Village, and three villages of the western area merged into Nishifu Village. Fuchū-eki reorganized as a town, without changing its name.
- 1893: Three Tama districts were admitted to Tokyo Prefecture. Fuchū-eki changed its name to Fuchū Town.
- 1910: The Tokyo Gravel Railroad (later JNR Shimogawara Line) is opened for traffic.
- 1913: Telephone service commenced.
- 1916: Keiō Electric Tram (part of present Keiō Line) opened for traffic.
- 1922: Tama Railroad (present Seibu Tamagawa Line) is opened for traffic.
- 1925: Gyokunan Electric Railroad (part of the present Keiō Line) opened for traffic.
- 1929: Nanbu Railroad (present JR East Nambu Line) opened for traffic.
- 1943: Tokyo Prefecture merged with Tokyo City, forming Tokyo-to.
- 1954 April 1: Fuchū Town, Tama Village, Nishifu Village merged into Fuchū City, with the structure of a city.
- 1956: New Kōshū Highway is opened for traffic between Higashi Fuchū and Honshūku.
- 1961: New Kōshū Highway is opened for traffic between Higashi Fuchū and Chōfu.
- 1968: The 300 million yen robbery occurred in Harumicho. This was the biggest robbery in the history of the nation.
- 1973: The Musashino Line opened for traffic. The Shimogawara Line closed.

== Government ==
Fuchū has a mayor-council form of government with a directly elected mayor and a unicameral city council of 30 members. Fuchū contributes two members to the Tokyo Metropolitan Assembly. In terms of national politics, the city is part of Tokyo 18th district of the lower house of the Diet of Japan.

== Education ==
=== Colleges and universities ===
- Tokyo University of Foreign Studies
- Tokyo University of Agriculture and Technology
- National Police Academy
- Metropolitan Police Academy

=== Primary and secondary education ===
Fuchū has five public high schools are operated by the Tokyo Metropolitan Government Board of Education,

- Fuchu High School
- Fuchu-Higashi High School
- Fuchu-Nishi High School
- Fuchu Technical High School
- Nogyo High School

Tokyo Metropolis also operates three special education schools for the handicapped.

The city has 22 public elementary schools and 11 public junior high schools operated by the city government.

Public junior high schools:

- Fuchu No. 1 (府中第一中学校)
- Fuchu No. 2 (府中第二中学校)
- Fuchu No. 3 (府中第三中学校)
- Fuchu No. 4 (府中第四中学校)
- Fuchu No. 5 (府中第五中学校)
- Fuchu No. 6 (府中第六中学校)
- Fuchu No. 7 (府中第七中学校)
- Fuchu No. 8 (府中第八中学校)
- Fuchu No. 9 (府中第九中学校)
- Fuchu No. 10 (府中第十中学校)
- Sengen (浅間中学校)

Public elementary schools:

- Fuchu No. 1 (府中第一小学校)
- Fuchu No. 2 (府中第二小学校)
- Fuchu No. 3 (府中第三小学校)
- Fuchu No. 4 (府中第四小学校)
- Fuchu No. 5 (府中第五小学校)
- Fuchu No. 6 (府中第六小学校)
- Fuchu No. 7 (府中第七小学校)
- Fuchu No. 8 (府中第八小学校)
- Fuchu No. 9 (府中第九小学校)
- Fuchu No. 10 (府中第十小学校)
- Honshuku (本宿小学校)
- Koyanagi (小柳小学校)
- Minamicho (南町小学校)
- Minami Shiraitodai (南白糸台小学校)
- Musashidai (武蔵台小学校)
- Nisshin (日新小学校)
- Shimmachi (新町小学校)
- Shiraitodai (白糸台小学校)
- Sumiyoshi (住吉小学校)
- Wakamatsu (若松小学校)
- Yazaki (矢崎小学校)
- Yotsuya (四谷小学校)

There is one municipal kindergarten: Midori Kindergarten (みどり幼稚園).

There is also one private combined middle/high school and two private elementary schools.

- Meisei Junior/Senior High School (private)

== Transportation ==
=== Railway ===
Keio Corporation - Keiō Line

- Musashinodai - Tama-Reien - Higashi-Fuchū - Fuchū - Bubaigawara - Nakagawara

Keio Corporation - Keiō Keibajō Line

- Higashi-Fuchū - Fuchūkeibaseimonmae

JR East – Nambu Line

- Fuchū-Hommachi - Bubaigawara - Nishifu

JR East – Musashino Line

- Fuchū-Hommachi - Kita-Fuchū

Seibu Railway - Seibu Tamagawa Line

- Tama - Shiraitodai - Kyōteijō-mae - Koremasa

=== Bus routes ===
Most bus routes in the city start at Fuchū Station. Other routes start at Tama-Reien Station, Higashi-Fuchū Station, Bubaigawara Station, Nakagawara Station, Tama Station, Koremasa Station, or Seisekisakuragaoka Station.

=== Highways ===
==== Toll roads ====
- Chūō Expressway
  - Inagi Interchange (3.1; limited interchange)
  - Kunitachi Fuchū Interchange (4)
  - Fuchu Smart On/off-ramp (under construction)
    Chōfu Interchange (3) is not located in Fuchū city area, but serves the eastern half of city.

==== National highways ====
- National Route 20 (Kōshū Highway); Chūō Expressway and Route 20 are parallel to Keiō Line Railway, and run east to west, connecting Fuchū and central Tokyo.

==== Prefectural roads ====
- Tokyo Prefectural Route 9 Kawasaki Fuchu line Fuchū highway (also called the Kawasaki highway), Koremasa Bridge
- Tokyo Prefectural Route 14 Shinjuku Kunitachi line Tohachi Road
- Tokyo Prefectural Route 15 Fuchu; Kiyose line Koganei Highway
- Tokyo Prefectural Route 17 Tokorozawa Fuchu line Fuchū Highway
- Tokyo Prefectural Route 18 Fuchu Machida line Kamakura Highway, Sekido Bridge
- Tokyo Prefectural Route 20 Fuchu Sagamihara Line Fuchū Yotsuya Bridge (Yaen Highway)
- Tokyo Prefectural Route 110 Fuchu Mitaka line Hitomi Highway, Shin-Koganei Highway
- Tokyo Prefectural Route 133 Ogawa Fuchu line Kokubunji Highway
- Tokyo Prefectural Route 229 Fuchu Chōfu line Old Kōshū Highway
- Tokyo Prefectural Route 245 Tachikawa Kokubunji Line Takikubo Dori
- Tokyo Prefectural Route 247 Fuchu Koganei line (the section in Fuchū is unopened for traffic)
- Tokyo Prefectural Route 248 Fuchu Kodaira line Shin-Koganei Highway

== Local attractions ==
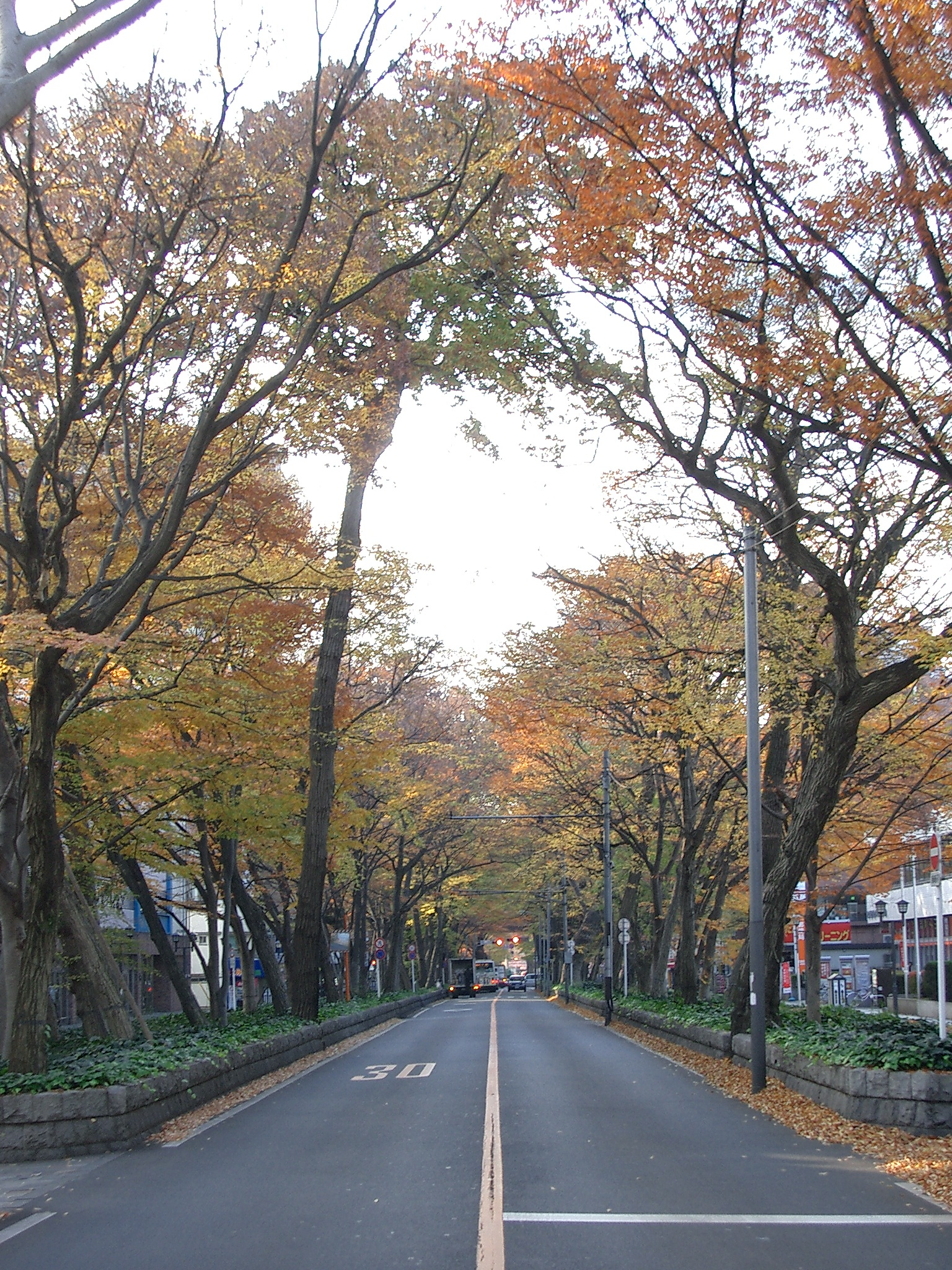
Baba Daimon Keyaki avenue

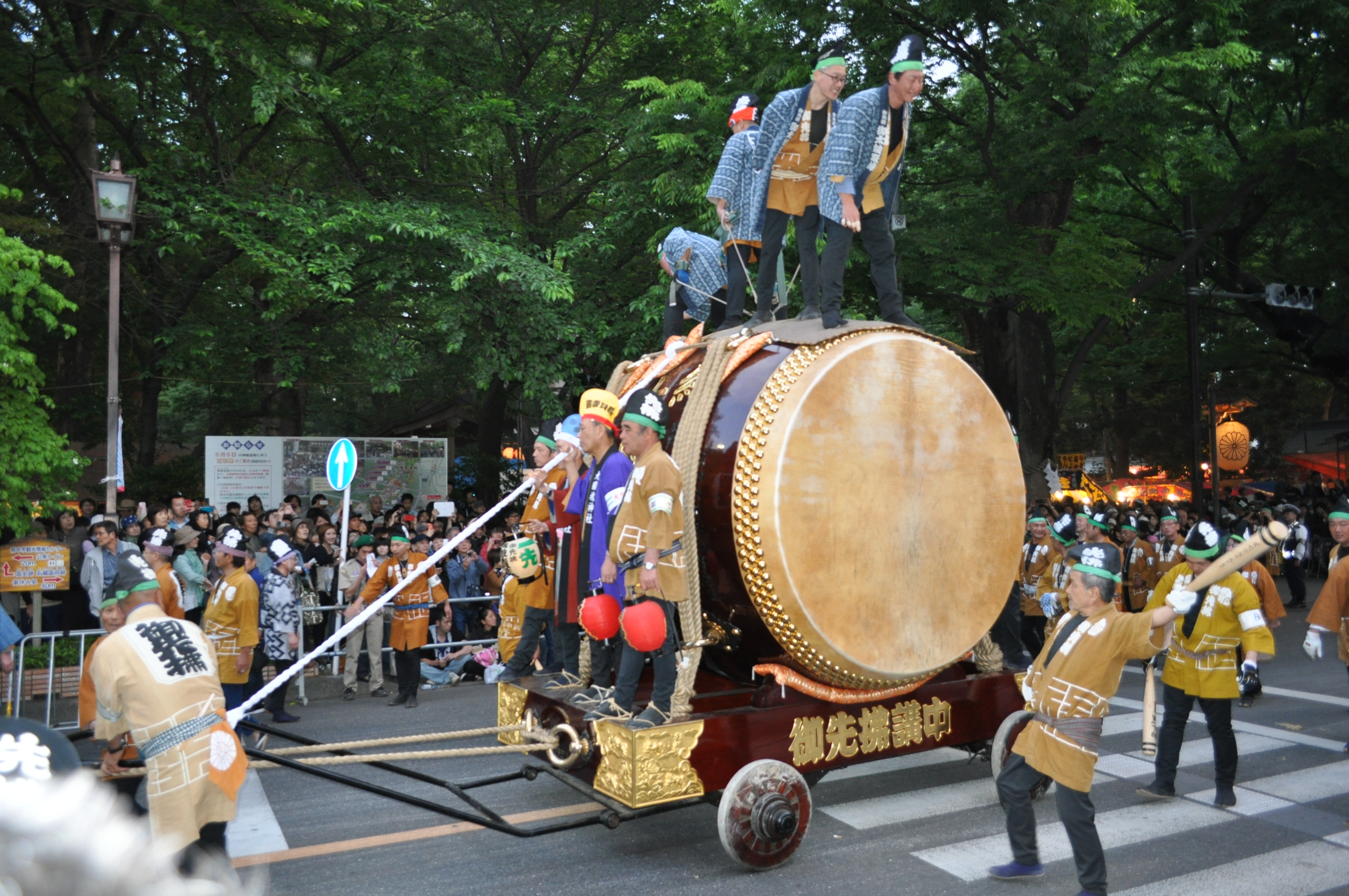
One of the giant drums for the Kurayami festival held at Okunitam Shrine every spring

- Kyodo no mori open-air museum and park
- Tokyo Racecourse hosts numerous G1 (Grade 1) races.
- Ōkunitama Shrine
- Fuchū Air Base of the Japan Air Self-Defense Force
- Fuchu Prison, one of Japan's largest prisons

== Sports ==
- Suntory Sungoliath - a rugby team based in Fuchū
- Toshiba Brave Lupus - a rugby team based in Fuchū
- Fuchu Athletic F.C. - a futsal club based in Fuchū
- Fuchū was part of the route used for the athletic 50 kilometer walk and marathon events at the 1964 Summer Olympics.

== Notable people ==
- Shinnosuke Furumoto, voice actor
- Wakatoba Hiromi, sumo wrestler
- Kazunari Hosaka, professional soccer player
- Jun Ichikawa, director
- Rei Igarashi, voice actress
- Anna Inotsume, racing driver
- Kuroda Kan'ichi, Marxist politician
- Tomomi Kasai, idol singer
- Eri Kitamura, voice actress
- Osamu Kobayashi, anime director
- Tetsuya Komuro, musician
- Seiji Mizushima, anime director
- Homare Sawa, professional women's soccer player
- Taro Sekiguchi, motorcycle racer
- Kunihiko Takizawa, professional soccer player
- Naoki Urasawa, manga artist
- Kaidō Yasuhiro, sumo wrestler

== Sister cities ==
- Sakuho, Nagano, Japan
- Hernals, Vienna, Austria
