= Ōkunitama Shrine =

Shrine in Fuchū, Tokyo, Japan

Ōkunitama Shrine 大國魂神社
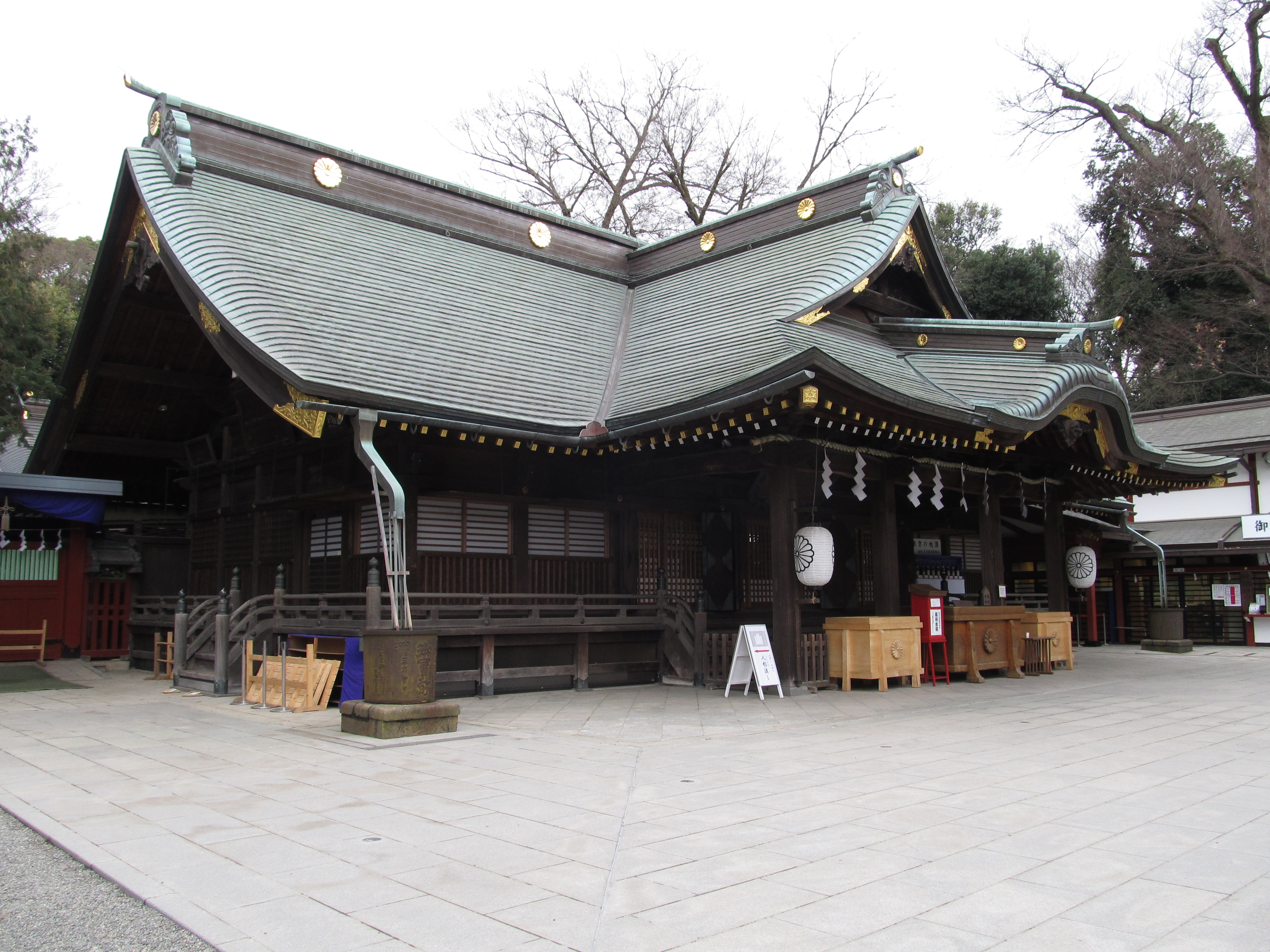
- Ōkunitama Jinja Haiden

- Location within Japan

Religion
- Affiliation: Shinto
- Deity: Ōkuninushi; Okunitama
- Type: Imperial Shrine, 3rd rank (Kanpei-shōsha)

Location
- Coordinates: 35°40′03″N 139°28′44″E

Architecture
- Style: nagare-zukuri
- Established: 111 AD (legendary)

Website
- www.ookunitamajinja.or.jp

Ōkunitama Shrine (大國魂神社, Ōkunitama Jinja) is a shrine located in Fuchū, Tokyo, Japan. Six shrines in Musashi province were consolidated and their gods enshrined there. Ōkunitama is now known as one of the five major shrines in Tokyo, the others being the Tokyo Great Shrine, Yasukuni Shrine, Hie Shrine and Meiji Shrine.

It is the Sōja of Musashi Province

It is dedicated to Musahi no Okunitama identified as Ōkuninushi

== General description ==
Within the shrine complex, there are many buildings and points of interest. The main shrine buildings are in a walled inner complex protected by an inner and outer gate. The main shrine is dedicated to Ōkuninushi. In addition, the main shrine is also an amalgamation of branches of the six main shrines from around Musashi Province:

In addition, the main shrine complex is surrounded by seven smaller subsidiary shrines. These are Matsuo Shrine, Tatsumi Shrine, Tōshōguu Shrine, Sumiyoshi Shrine, Ōwashi Shrine, Miyanome Shrine and an Inari shrine. There is also a sumo ring and a Russo-Japanese War memorial, as well as the remains of the former Musashi provincial office.

== History ==
According to the shrine's legend, it was established on 5 May in the 41st year of the reign of Emperor Keikō, which corresponds to 111 AD in the western calendar. The offspring of Noomiame-no-hohino-mikoto (出雲臣天穂日命) appointed Kuni no miyatsuko of Musashi Province, the capital of which was located in what is now Fuchū. Its position as the central shrine (総社, Sosha) of Musashi Province was confirmed from the Taika period (645 AD), and archaeological evidence confirms that the shrine was located very close to the provincial capital (kokufu) of Musashi.

During the late Heian period (1062) Minamoto no Yoriyoshi and his son, Minamoto no Yoshiie donated thousands of zelkova saplings to the shrine as part of a prayer for victory in military campaigns in Mutsu Province, and in 1182 Minamoto no Yoritomo made an invocation for the safe delivery of a child during the pregnancy of Hojo Masako. Following the start of the Kamakura period, Minamoto no Yoritomo extensively rebuilt the shrine. It was rebuilt again in 1590 under Tokugawa Ieyasu and after a fire in 1649.

Under the State Shinto system of the Meiji period, the shrine was officially renamed Ōkunitama Jinja in 1872, and appointed a Kanpei-shōsha (Imperial Shrine, 3rd rank) in 1886.

== Kurayami matsuri ==
The Kurayami matsuri (くらやみ祭り, Darkness Festival) is claimed to be one of the three oldest festivals in Kanto region. This festival is held every year, between 30 April and 6 May. Originally this festival was described as an utagaki (歌垣, courtship song festival).

Ryotaro Shiba, a Japanese essay writer and novelist, observed that this festival resulted in disorderly conduct by the participants. He claimed that, amongst the single men and women who had gathered to sing and dance for each other, were also those who were married and who intended to have sex under cover of darkness. In the Meiji Era, facing criticism from Christian missionaries, the authorities put a stop to this festival.

In its place, Kurayami Matsuri was created. Kurayami means 'darkness' and matsuri means 'festival' in Japanese. It was originally held during the night, but this was changed to evening in 1959.

On 4 May, the road approaching the temple (Keyaki Namiki (ケヤキ並木, Zelkova Row)) is used as a track for horse-racing and performances of a masked folk dance known as Fuchuu Hayashi (府中囃子). On 5 May, six large taiko drums lead eight mikoshi to a temporary holding area. They are returned to the shrine early in the morning the following day.

== Gallery ==
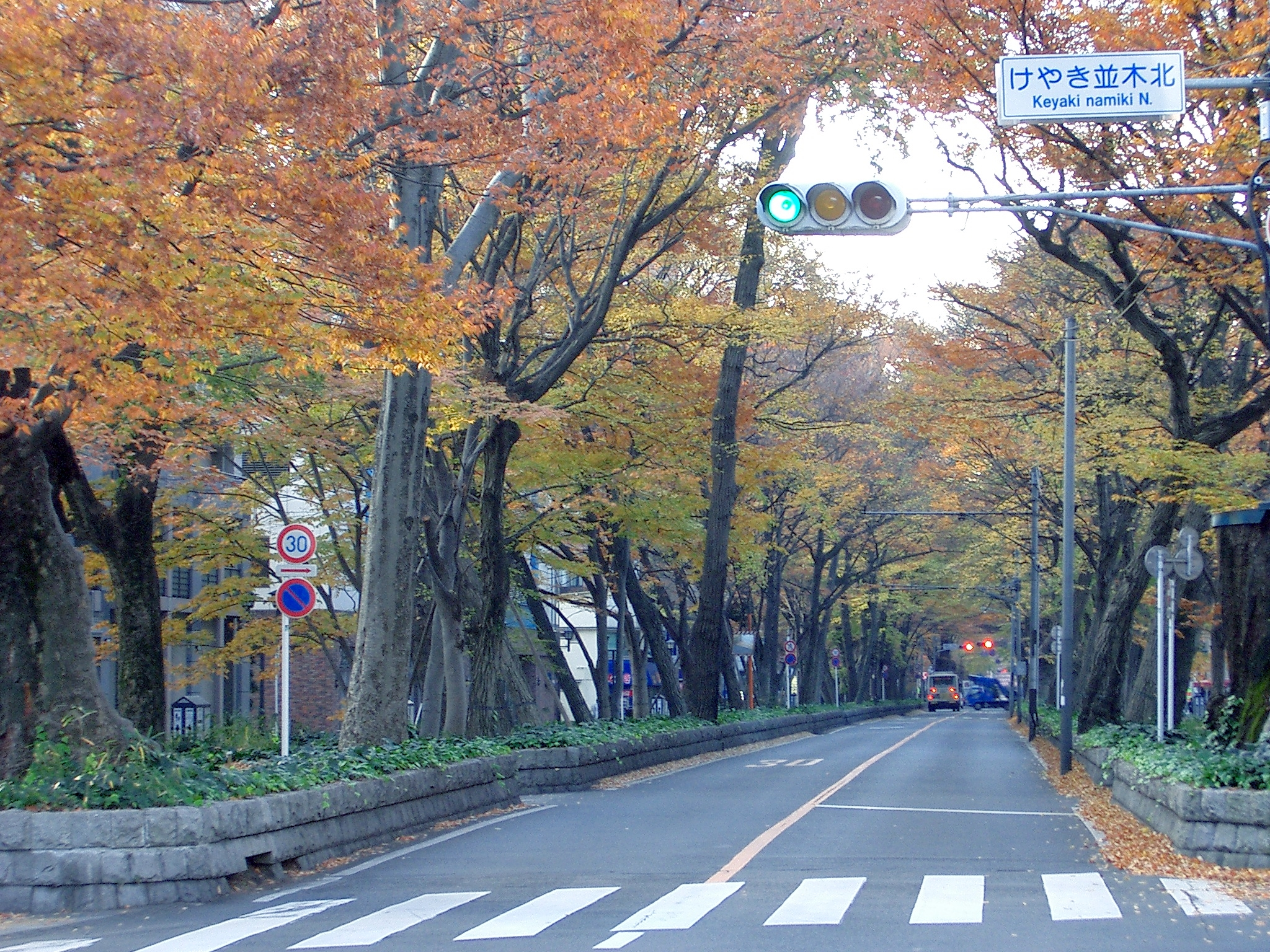
Keyaki Namiki Crossing

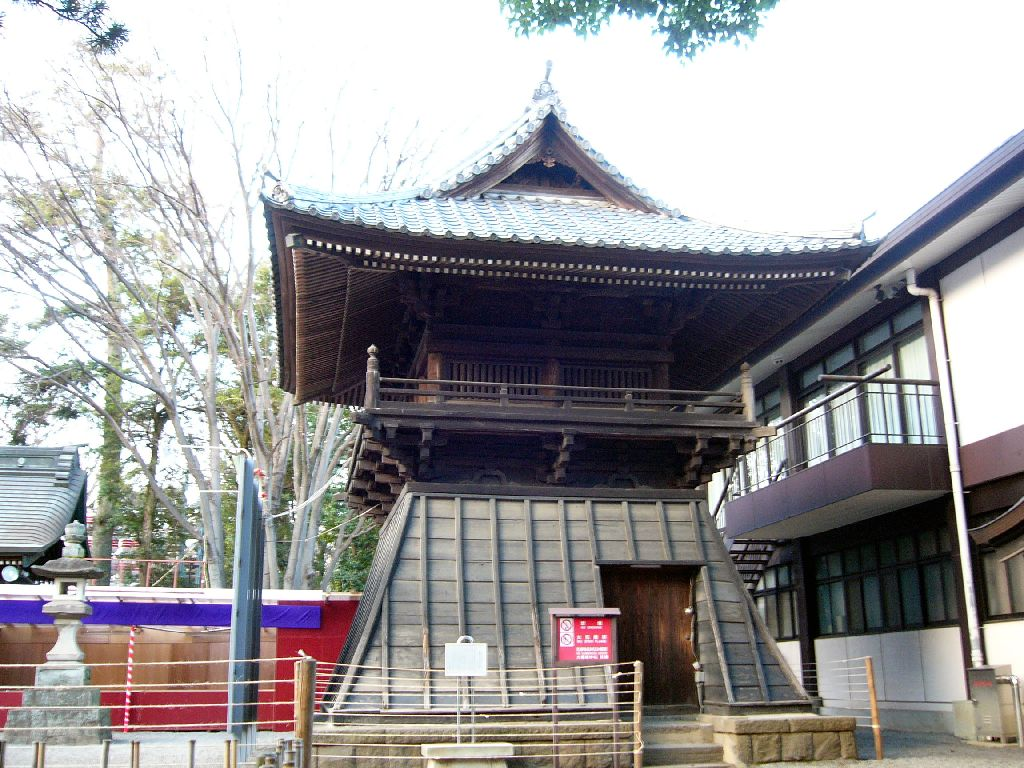
Drum Tower

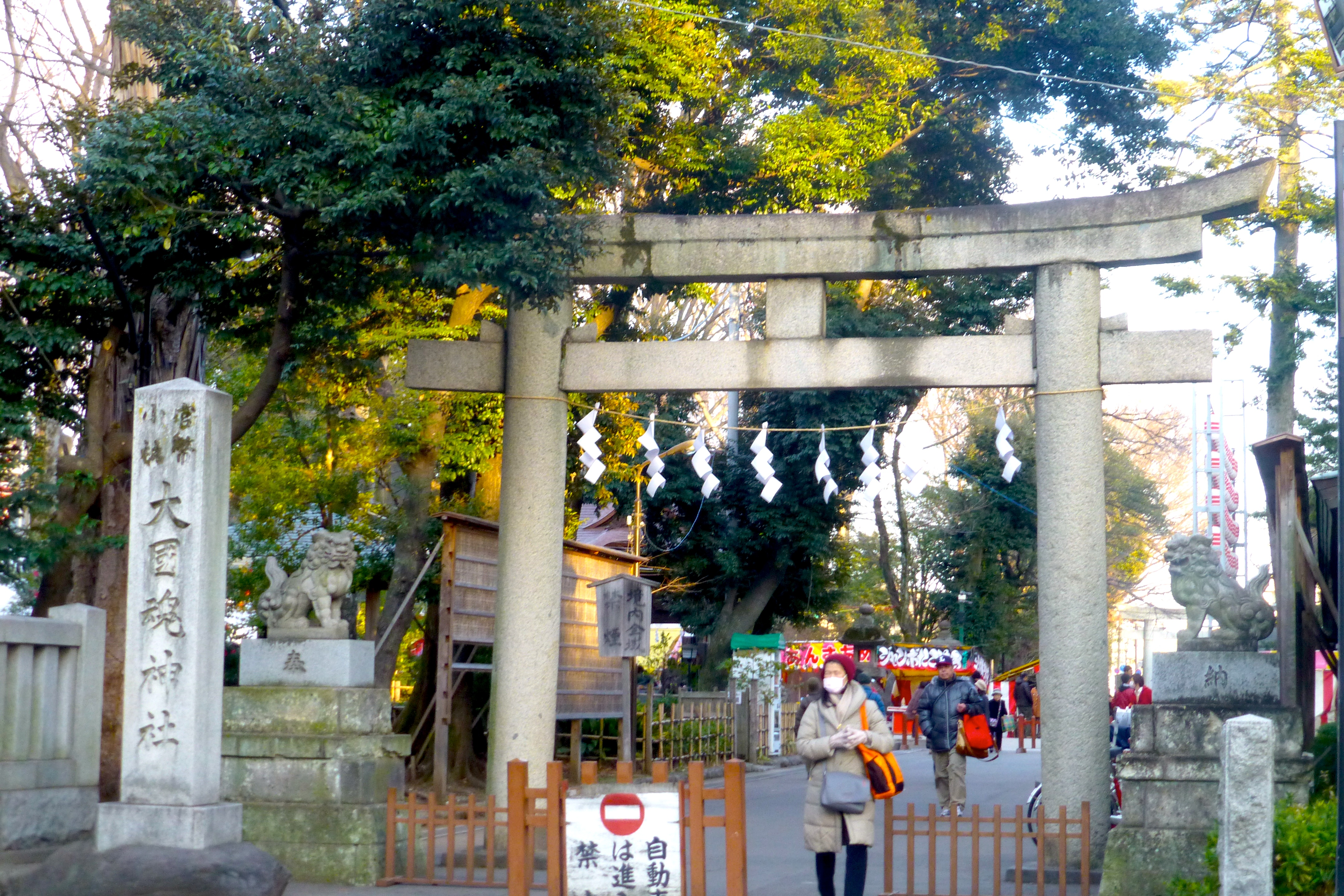
Torii gate

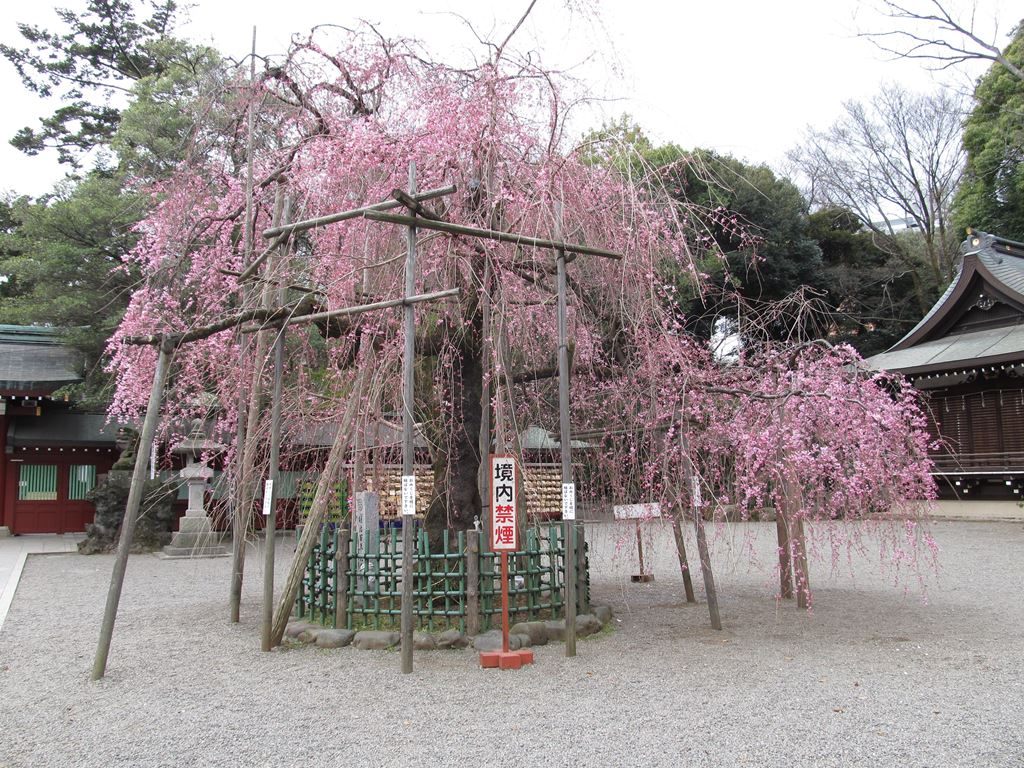
The cherry tree beside the hand-washing station

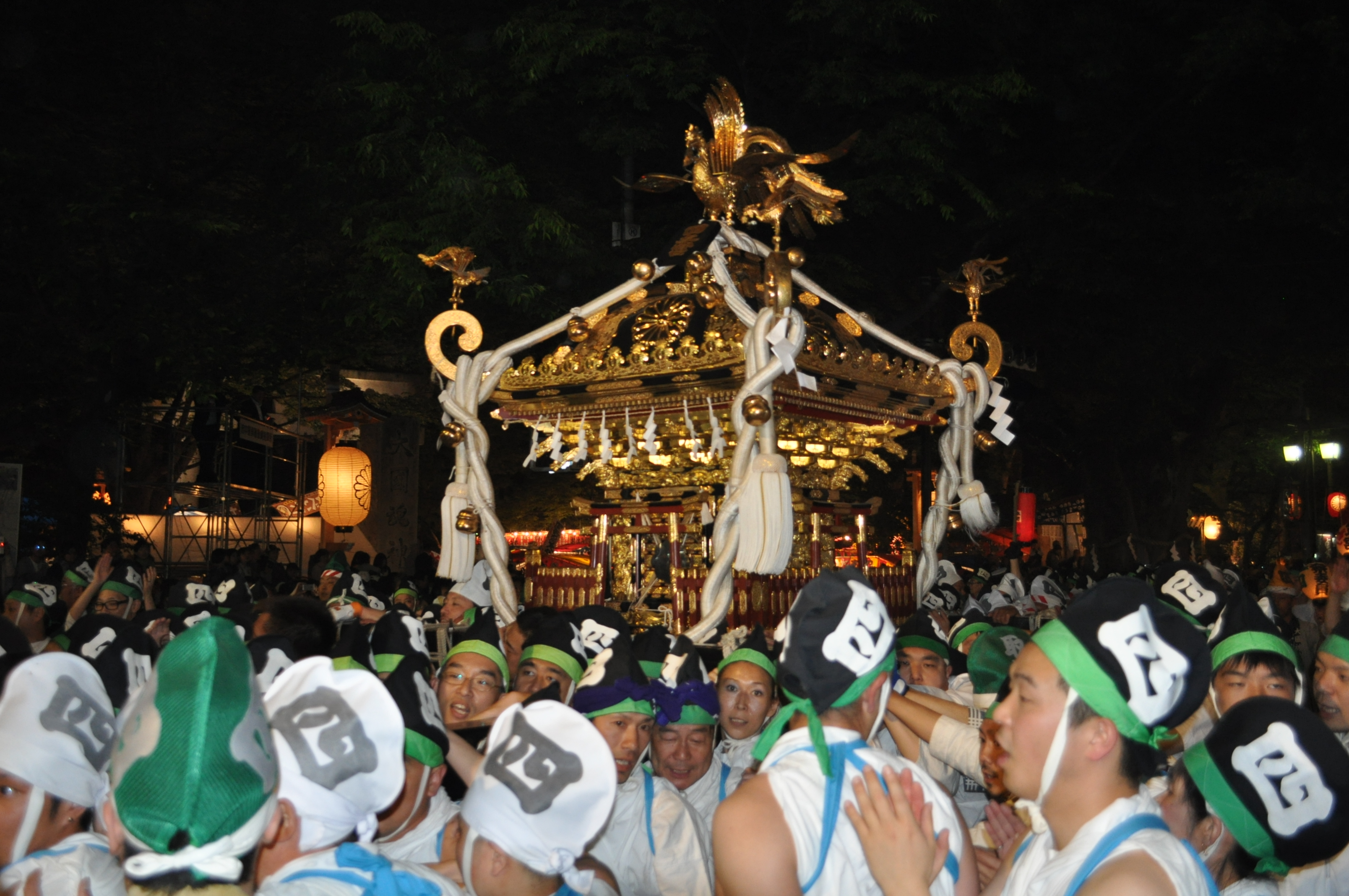
Kurayami Festival

== See also ==
- Owari Ōkunitama Shrine
- Ōyamato Shrine (worships Yamato Okunitama)
- Musashi Province Ichinomiya
  - Hikawa Shrine (Saitama)
  - Ono Shrine

== List of research papers ==
=== Kurayami matsuri and Ohkunitama shrine ===
- 中里 亮平 2009 Matsuri boom and influence on festivals: the case of the kurayami-matsuri festival at Okunitama shrine in Fuchu, Tokyo. The Japanese folklore review (24), 47–60.
- 中里 亮平 2008 Festivals and Influential members of the community: the case of the Kurayami-matsuri Festival at Okunitama shrine in Fuchu-shi, Tokyo. The Japanese folklore review (23), 51–64.
- Tsuruga Eisuke 2007 Possibility on recovery of the humanity, concerned with festival reciprocity : Through the Fuchu Kurayami Matsuri researches. Education for sustainable development 6, 105–112.
- Mogi Sakae, Shimada Kiyoshi 1989 The Kurayami Matsuri at Okunitama Shrine in Fuchu Transactions of the institute for Japanese culture and classics 64, 140–207,
- 杉浦 翔子 2006 A study of the chief priest system of the plum wine drinking ritual held at Owari-no-Okunitama Jinja 「皇学館論叢」 39(6), 36–63,
- Koide Goro 1983 On Argonauta argo Housed in the Okunitama Shrine.「ちりぼたん」 14(1), 21.

=== Utagaki ===
- 糸永 正之 2009 Utagaki in Bhutan: the verification of face-to-face interaction through fixed-verse songs. Asian folk culture studies (8), 1–32.
- Nittamachi Yoshinao 1997 The Symbolism of The Expression in Touka. Research memoirs of the Kobe Technical College 35, 89–94.
- Miyazaki Takeshi 1997 A Study of a Traditional Event Utagaki in Tsugaru Area.7 「日本歌謡研究」 37, 73–83.
