= Koganei Park =

Park in Tokyo, Japan

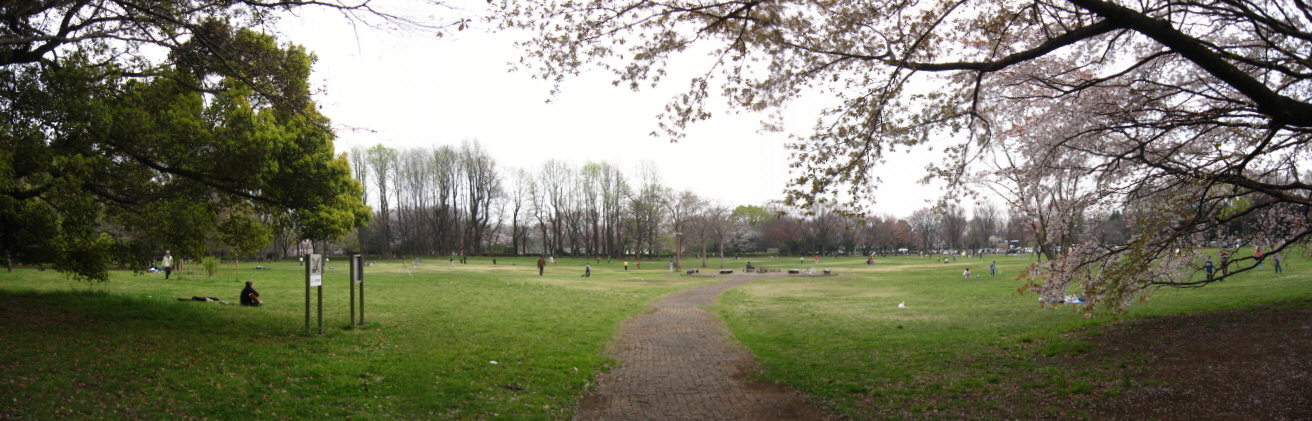
- Visitors enjoying Koganei Park
- Interactive map of Koganei Park
- Type: Metropolitan
- Location: Koganei, Tokyo, Japan
- Coordinates: 35°42′52″N 139°31′08″E
- Area: 793,544.33 square metres (196.08907 acres)
- Created: January 14, 1954

Koganei Park (小金井公園, Koganei Kōen) is a metropolitan park in Tokyo, having entrances in Koganei City, Kodaira City, Nishitokyo City, and Musashino City.

== Overview ==
The fifth-largest park in the Metropolitan Tokyo Area, Koganei Park is an attraction for local residents and tourists. The numerous varieties of plum trees in the park bloom in March, and the Cherry trees in April, providing a desirable setting for exercise enthusiasts, photographers, picnickers, and nature lovers.

The park's Edo-Tokyo Open Air Architectural Museum, which opened in March 1993, features buildings characteristic to different historical periods and those built by famous Japanese architects. The buildings were moved from their original locations and arranged at the museum site to mimic the set up of a village.

== Key Features ==
- Cherry Tree Garden
- Plum Tree Forest
- Edo-Tokyo Open Air Architectural Museum
- Sports Complex
- Cycling Course
- Bird Sanctuary
- Archery Range
- Source of Shakujii River
