= Edo-Tokyo Open Air Architectural Museum =

Coordinates: 35°42′56.96″N 139°30′45.41″E

- 江戸東京たてもの園
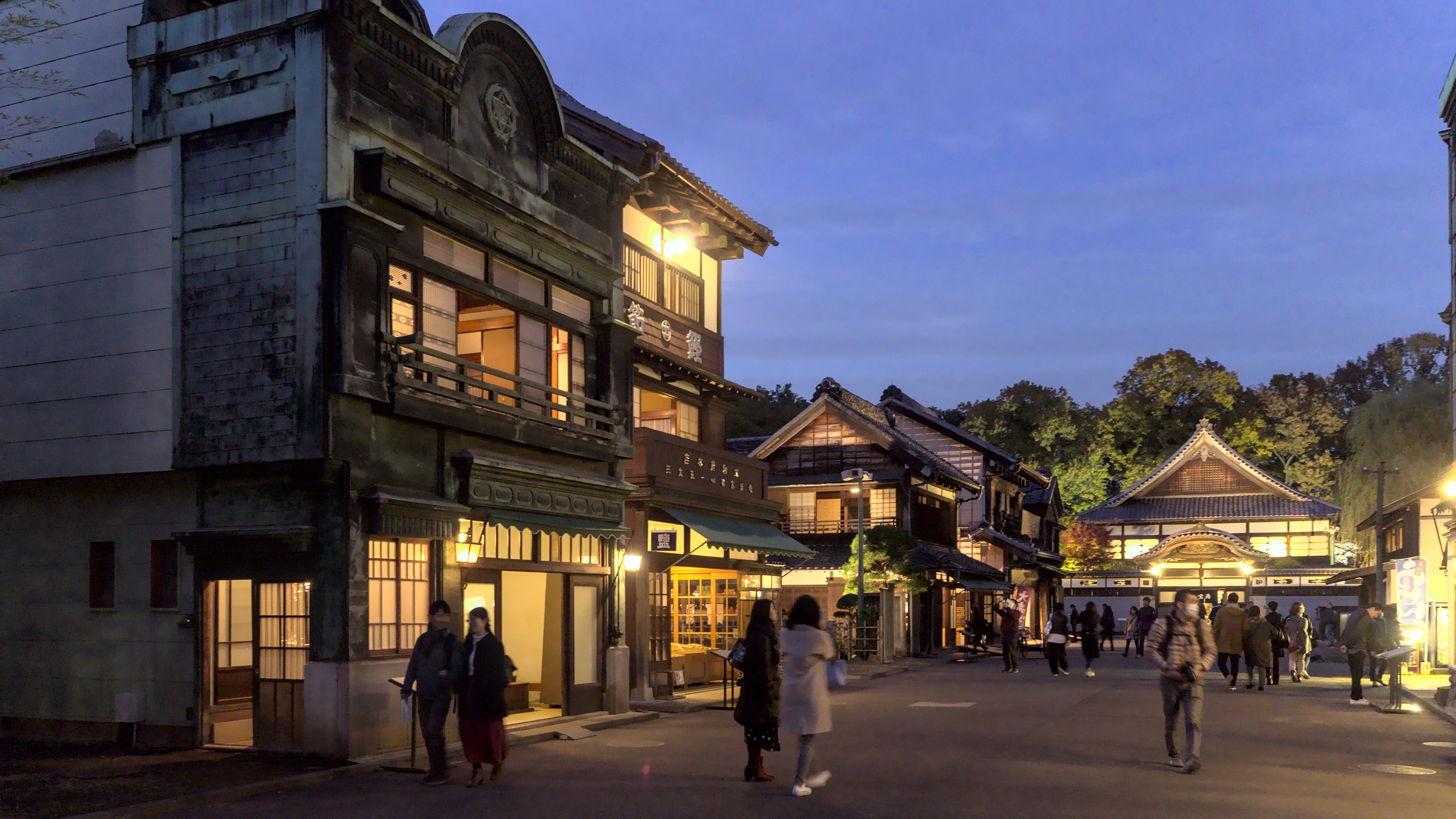
- Established: 28 March 1993
- Location: Koganei, Tokyo, Japan
- Type: Architecture museum
- Visitors: 237,901 (FY2016)
- Director: Terunobu Fujimori
- Owner: Tokyo Metropolitan Government
- Website: www.tatemonoen.jp/english/

The Edo-Tokyo Open Air Architectural Museum (江戸東京たてもの園, Edo Tōkyō Tatemono En; lit. "Edo Tokyo Buildings Garden") is an open-air museum located within Koganei Park, Tokyo, Japan. It opened in 1993 as a branch of the Edo-Tokyo Museum and is operated by the Tokyo Metropolitan Foundation for History and Culture, a public interest incorporated foundation. The museum relocates and reconstructs buildings that originally stood in Tokyo (formerly Edo) from the Edo period through the mid-Showa era, which could no longer be preserved at their original locations, and presents them as part of the city's cultural heritage. The site covers an area of 70,164 m^{2} (17.338 acres).

The museum grounds feature 30 restored structures, including the private residences of politicians, entrepreneurs, architects, and farmers from different historical periods, as well as traditional businesses such as an izakaya (Japanese-style pub), a sentō (public bathhouse), and a ryokan (traditional inn). These buildings recreate the appearance of historic Japanese streetscapes, and visitors are able to enter and explore their interiors.

The origins of the open-air museum date back to 1934 with the opening of the Tokyo Kyōdo Shiryō Chinretsukan (lit. "Tokyo Local History Exhibition Hall") in Arisugawa-no-miya Memorial Park. In 1948, it was relocated to Inokashira Park and renamed the Musashino Hakubutsukan (lit. "Musashino Museum"). In 1954, it was moved again to Koganei Park and reopened as the Musashino Kyōdokan (lit. "Musashino Folklore Museum"), which remained in operation until 1991.

== Restored buildings ==
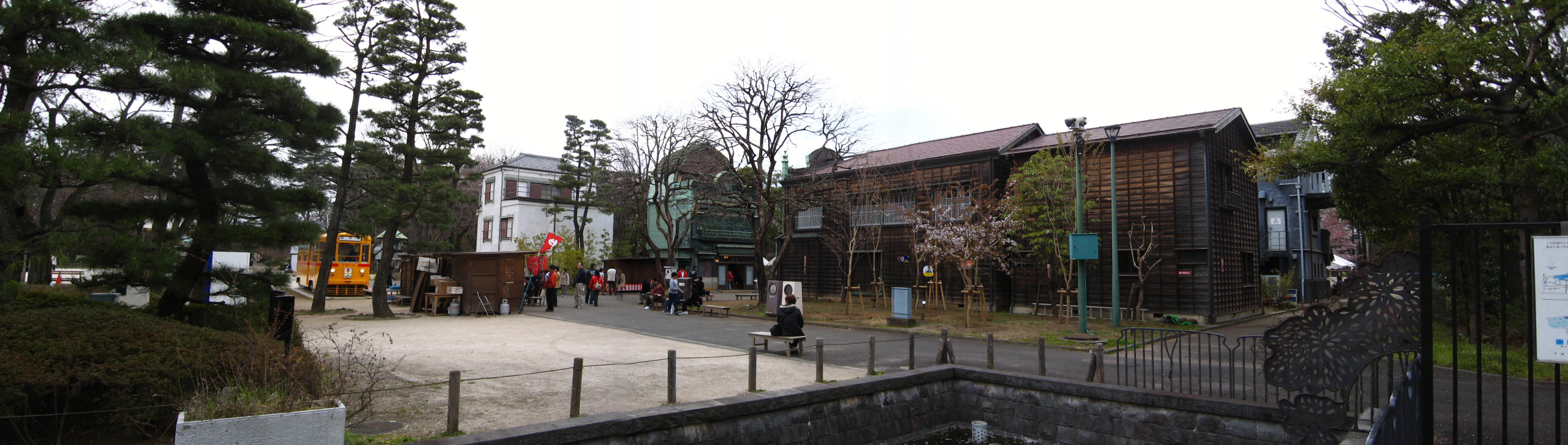
Around East Zone Square (April 2009)

The park is divided into three zones. The west zone is lined with Musashino farm homes and Yamanote houses, the center zone is lined with prestigious historic buildings, and the east zone is a reproduction of the downtown area. The following is a complete list of buildings exhibited at the Edo-Tokyo Open Air Architectural Museum.

=== Center Zone ===
- Former Kōkaden Hall (now Museum Visitor Center): A temporary building erected in the Imperial Palace Outer Garden as the venue of 2600 years commemoration ceremony in 1940. It was relocated to this area in 1941 after the ceremony.
- Former Jishōin Mausoleum: A mausoleum built in 1652 in the early Edo period by Kōra Muneyoshi, a master builder of the Shogunate. Third Shogun Tokugawa Iemitsu's concubine Jishōin (great-granddaughter of Ishida Mitsunari) was enshrined. It is a Designated Tangible Cultural Property (building) of the Tokyo Metropolitan Government.
- House of Takahashi Korekiyo: The residence of Takahashi Korekiyo, a politician who was assassinated in February 26 Incident on the building's second floor. It was completed in 1902 (Meiji 35) and made entirely of tsuga wood. This is an early example of using window glass in a Japanese-style mansion.
- Nishikawa Annex: A house of Izaemon Nishikawa, the founder of Nishikawa Silk Reeling, used as a guesthouse and retreat. It was completed in 1922 (Taisho 11).
- Date Family Gate: The front gate of a mansion built by the Date Marquis family (formerly the Date family of the Uwajima Domain) in Shirokane Sankocho during the Taishō era. It is built in the style of a daimyo mansion with a one-sided office.
- Kaisuian: A Taisho era Chashitsu (tearoom) by Sohenryu (宗徧流) tea masters Yamagishi Soju (Kaisui).
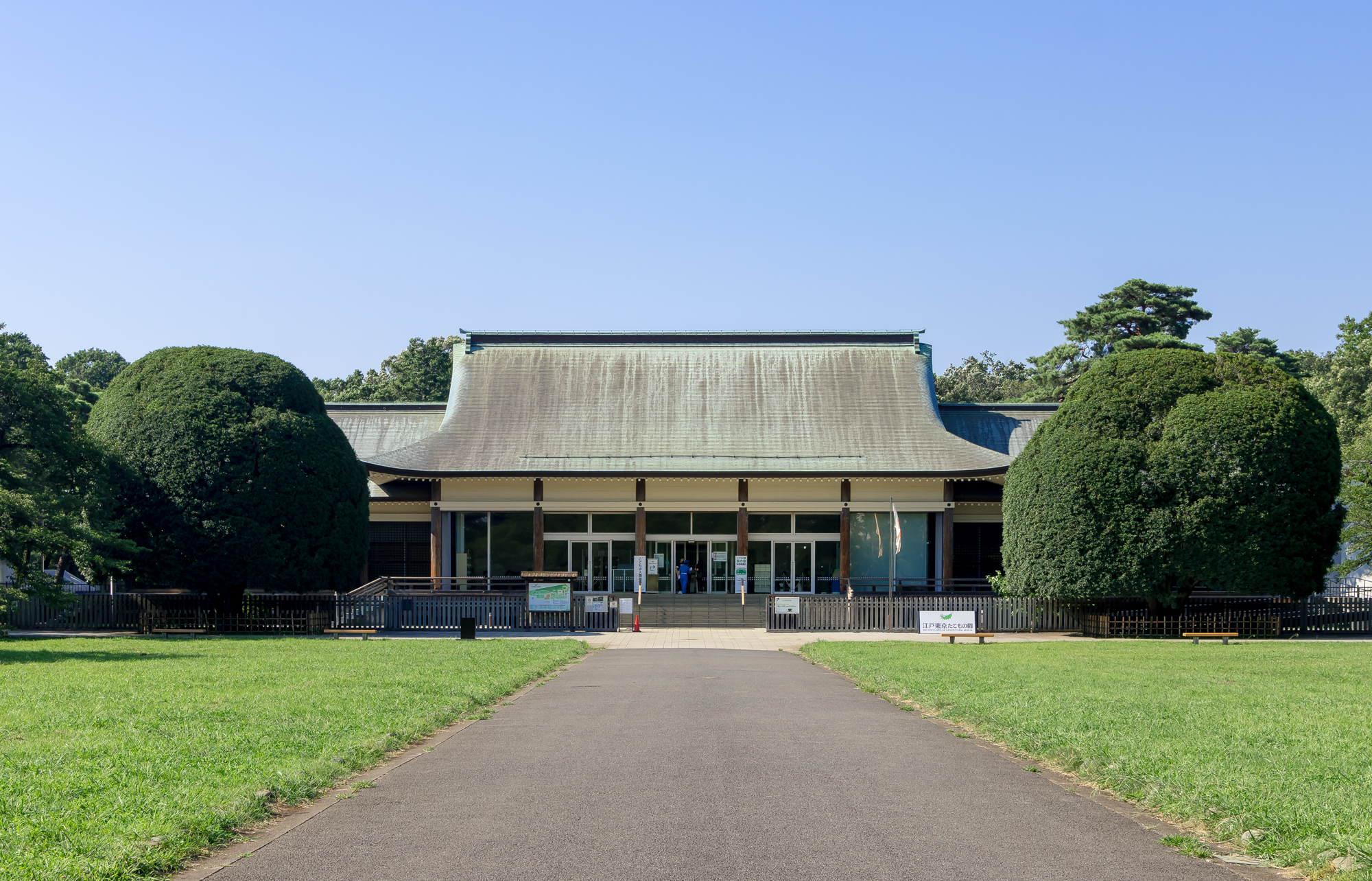
Former Kōkaden

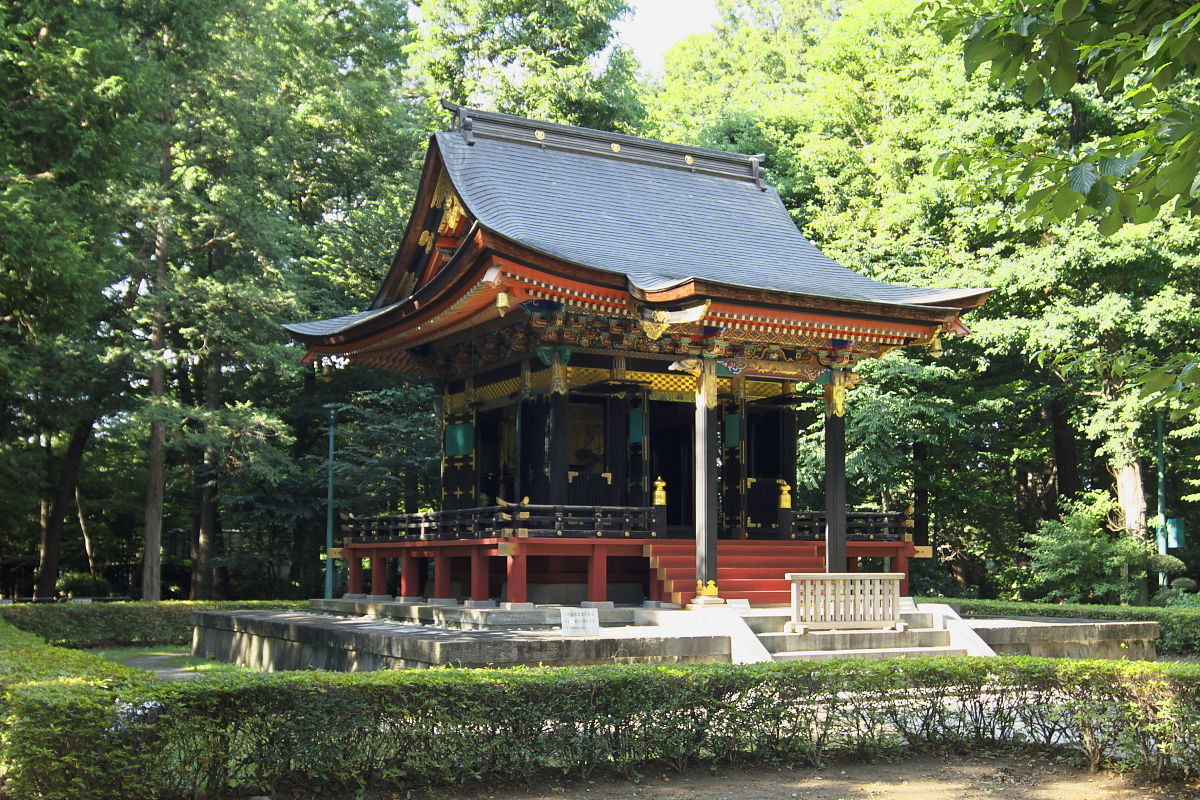
Former Jishōin mauseolum

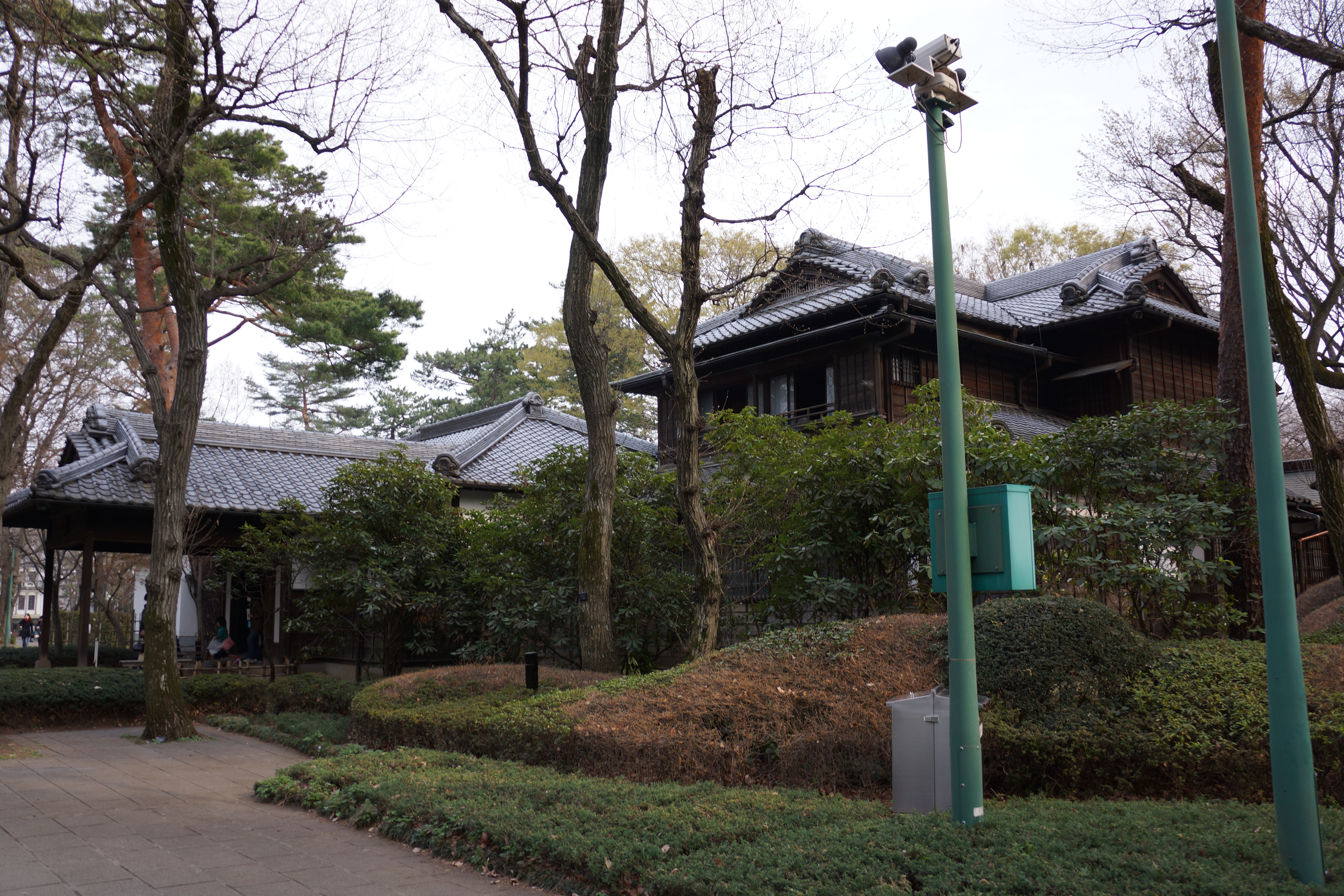
House of Takahashi Korekiyo

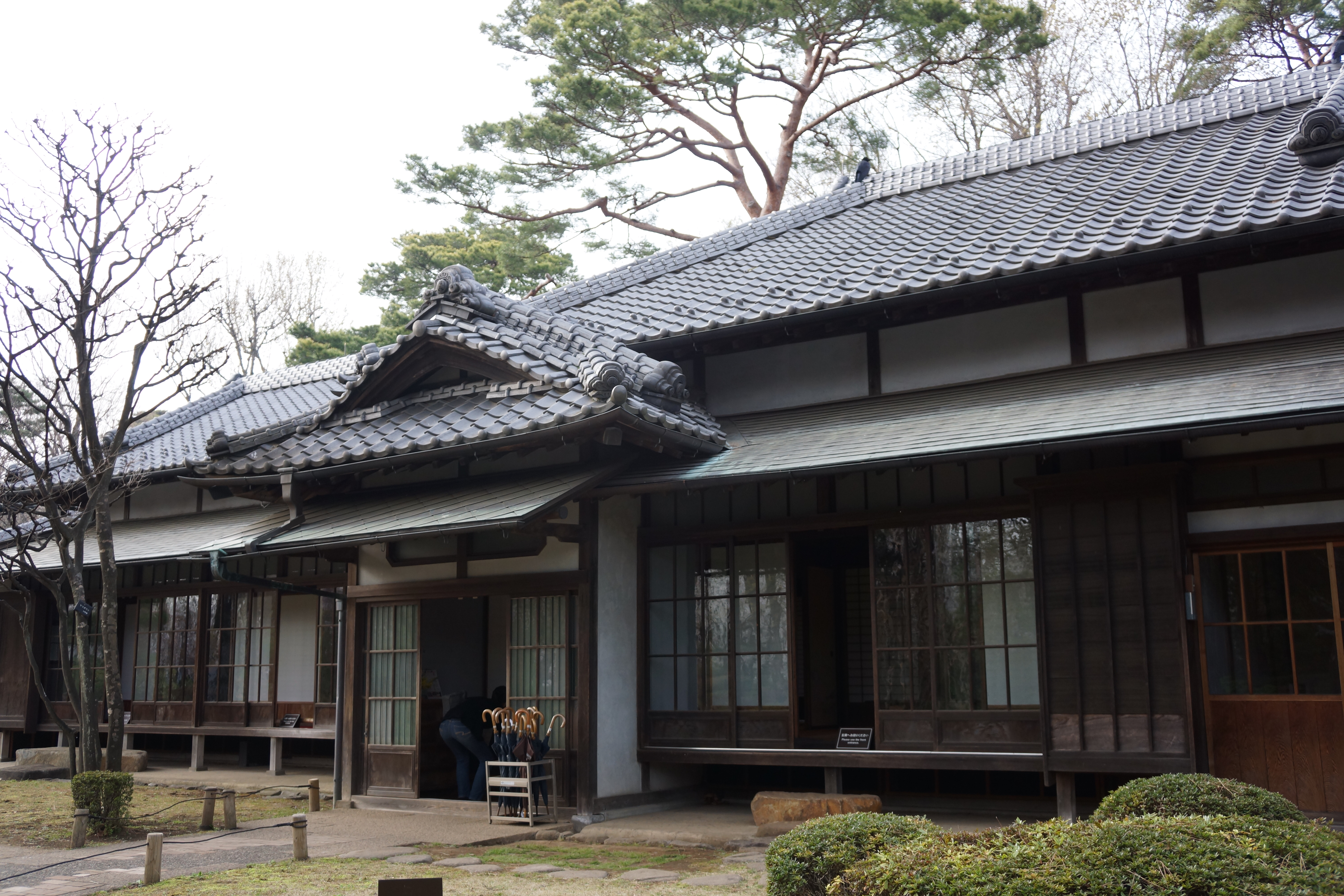
Nishikawa Annex

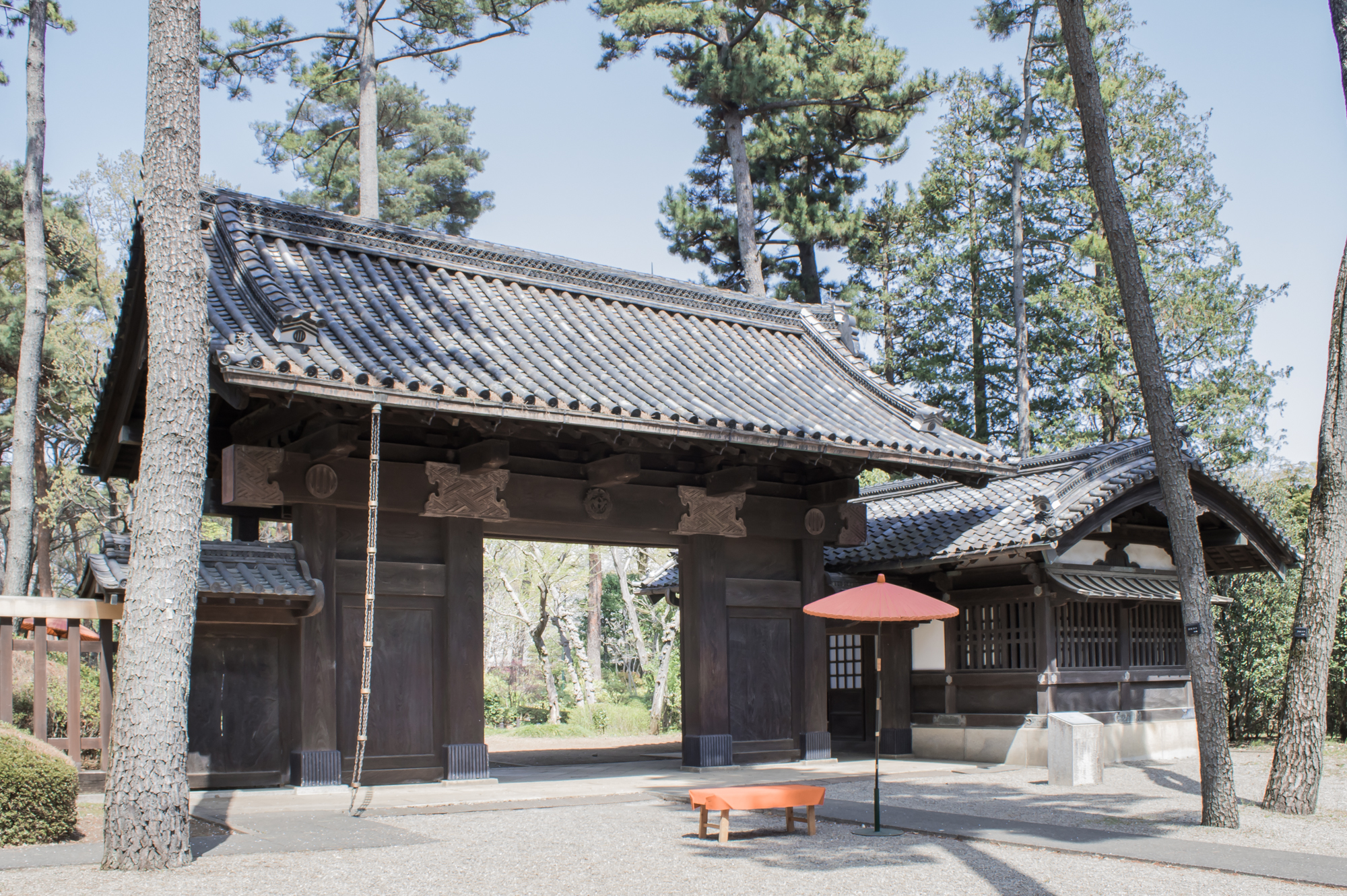
Date clan gate

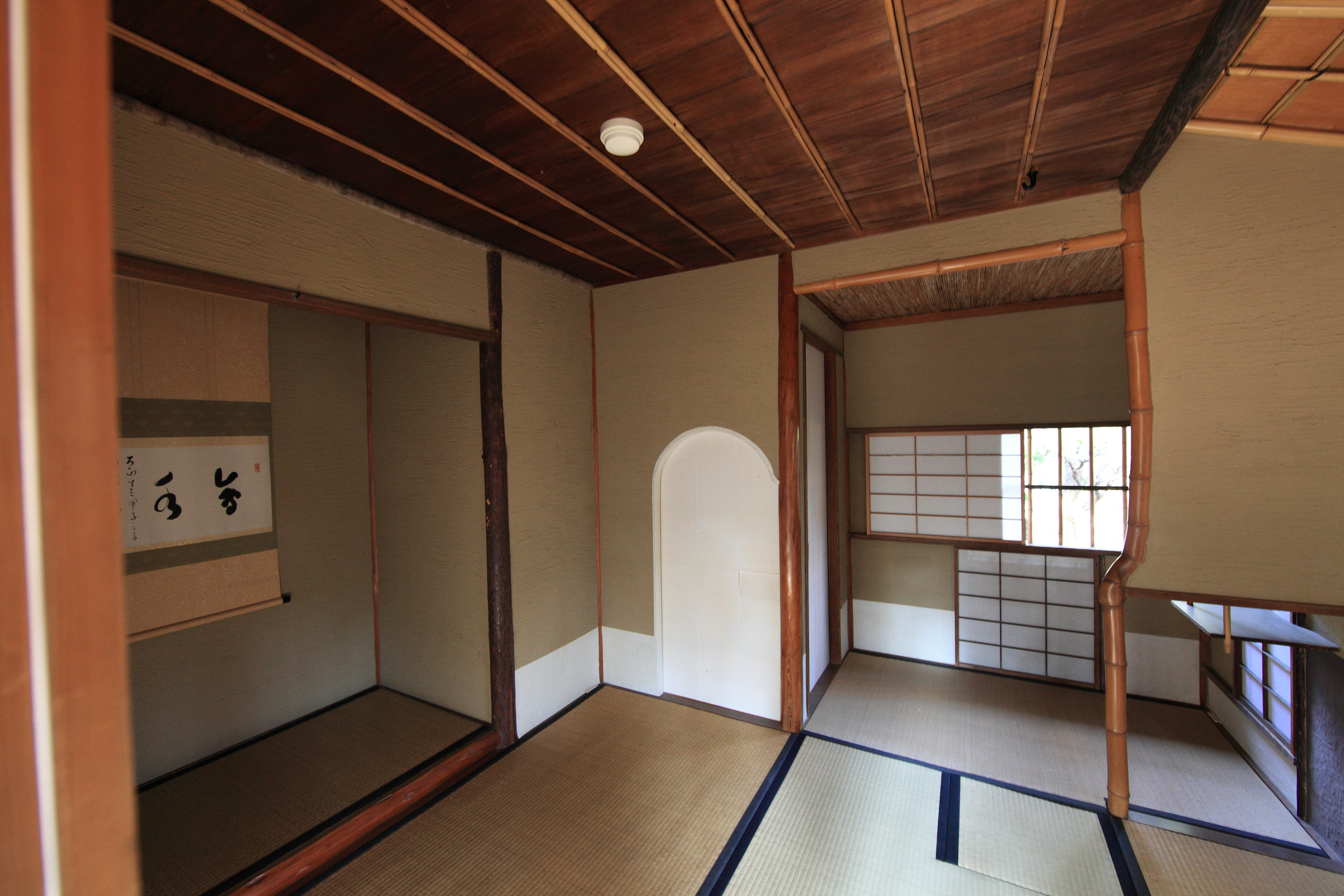
Kaisuian interior

=== West Zone ===
- Tokiwadai Photo Studio: A photo studio built in Tokiwadai, a suburban residential area in the early Showa period. The Art Deco-style building, erected in 1937, utilizes large areas of windows on the north side to allow indirect light to enter.
- Mitsui Hachirōemon Residence: A Japanese-style residence of the Mitsui Zaibatsu family, which was relocated from Kyoto to Azabu, Minato-ku after the end of World War II. A tangible cultural property (building) designated by the Tokyo Metropolitan Government.
- Takakura in Amami: A grain storehouse built in Uken Village, Amami Ōshima, around the end of the Edo period. In the Takakura style, the thatched roof is used as a storage.
- Yoshinoya farmhouse: A farm house in Nozaki Village, Tama County (多摩郡) (currently Nozaki, Mitaka City) in the late Edo period. The house's interior has been laid out as it was around 1955.
- Hachioji Sennin Concentric (八王子千人同心) Kumigashira House: The mansion of the late Edo period Kumigashira (郷士). It has a higher style than ordinary private houses, such as a tatami room with an alcove and an entrance with a ceremony table.
- House of Kunio Maekawa: modern architecture house of Kunio Maekawa is 1942 Jitei was built in [2] . While keeping the building area small under the building control during the war, the living room with a colonnade and the second floor in a loft style are arranged in the center of the large roof. A tangible cultural property (building) designated by the Tokyo Metropolitan Government.
- Den-en-chōfu House (Okawa House): A Western-style suburban house built in the suburbs that was developed as a garden city. There is a pergola on the clapboard outer wall and terrace . Designed by Michio Mitsui, who was in Okada Shinichirō's office.
- Tsunashima family farmhouse: A valuable mid-Edo period farmhouse in Okamoto, Setagaya.
- Koide House: A house designed by architect Sutemi Horiguchi immediately after returning from Europe in 1923. It is a mixed Japanese-Western style house with a large quadrangular pyramidal roof and broad eaves. It is designated a tangible cultural property (building) by the Tokyo Metropolitan Government.
- De Lalande House: Shinjuku Shinanomachi (信濃町) there to the Western Museum. It was a one-story building that was said to have been designed by meteorologist and physicist Kitao Jiro as his own residence, but around 1910, it was extensively expanded to a three-story wooden building by the German architect Georg de Lalande. An external elevator to allow access to the second floor was added after the building was relocated to the museum.
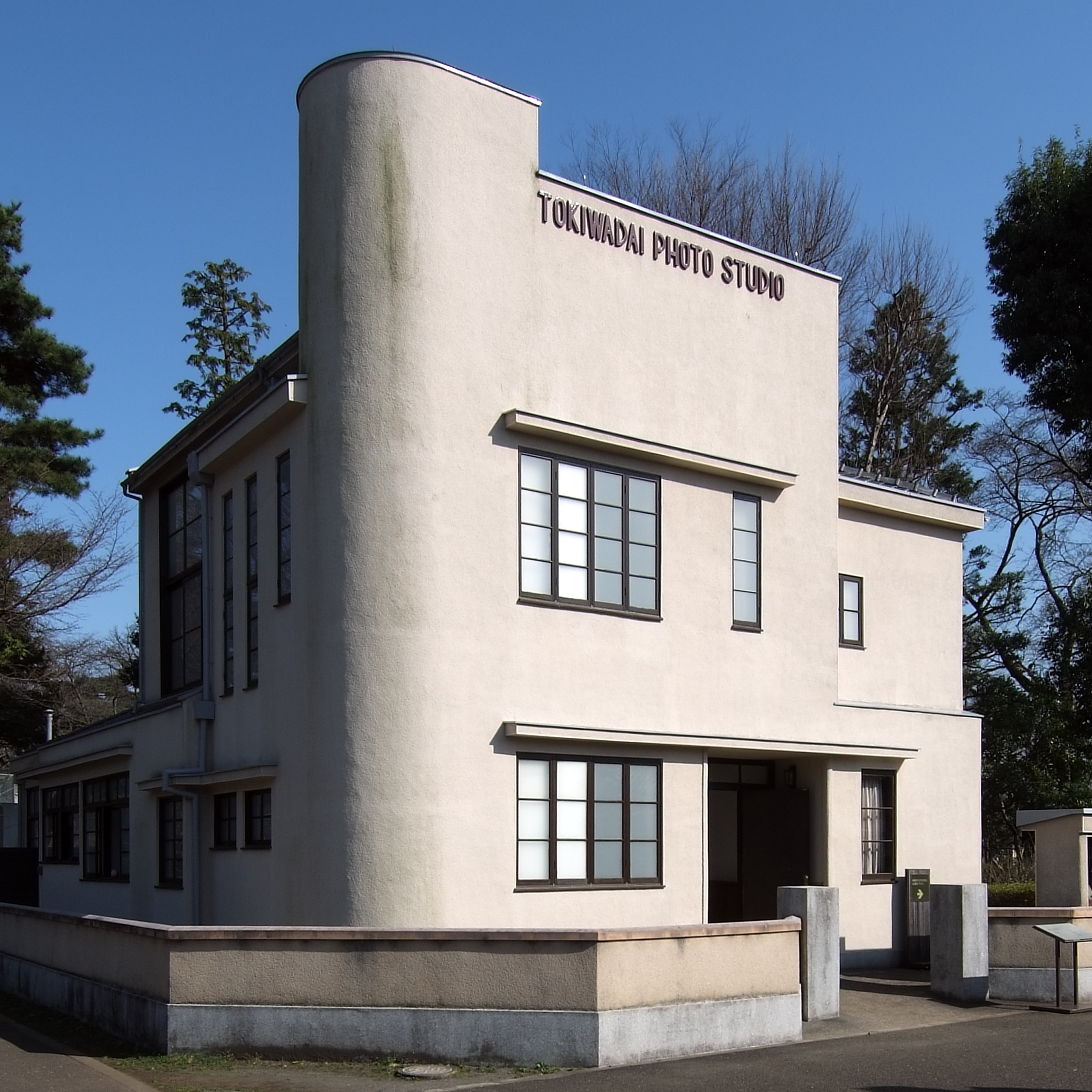
Tokiwadai Photo Studio

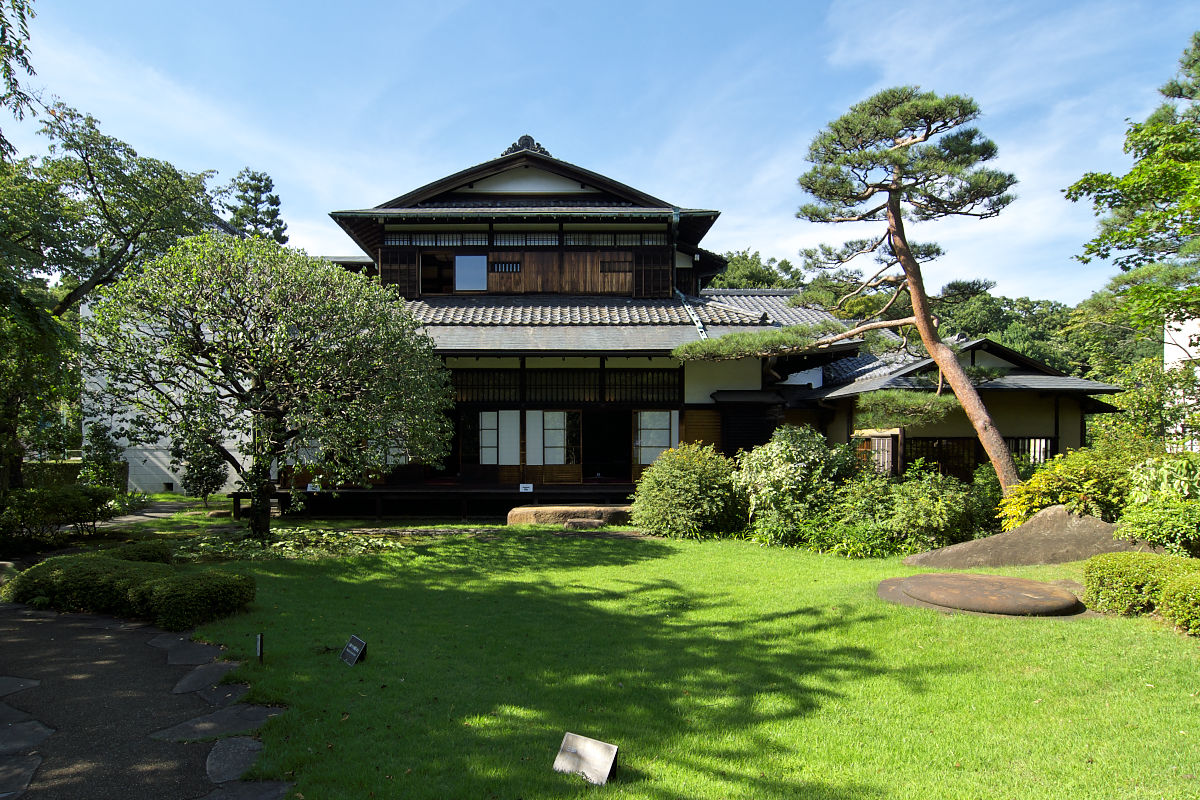
Residence of Hachiroemon Mitsui

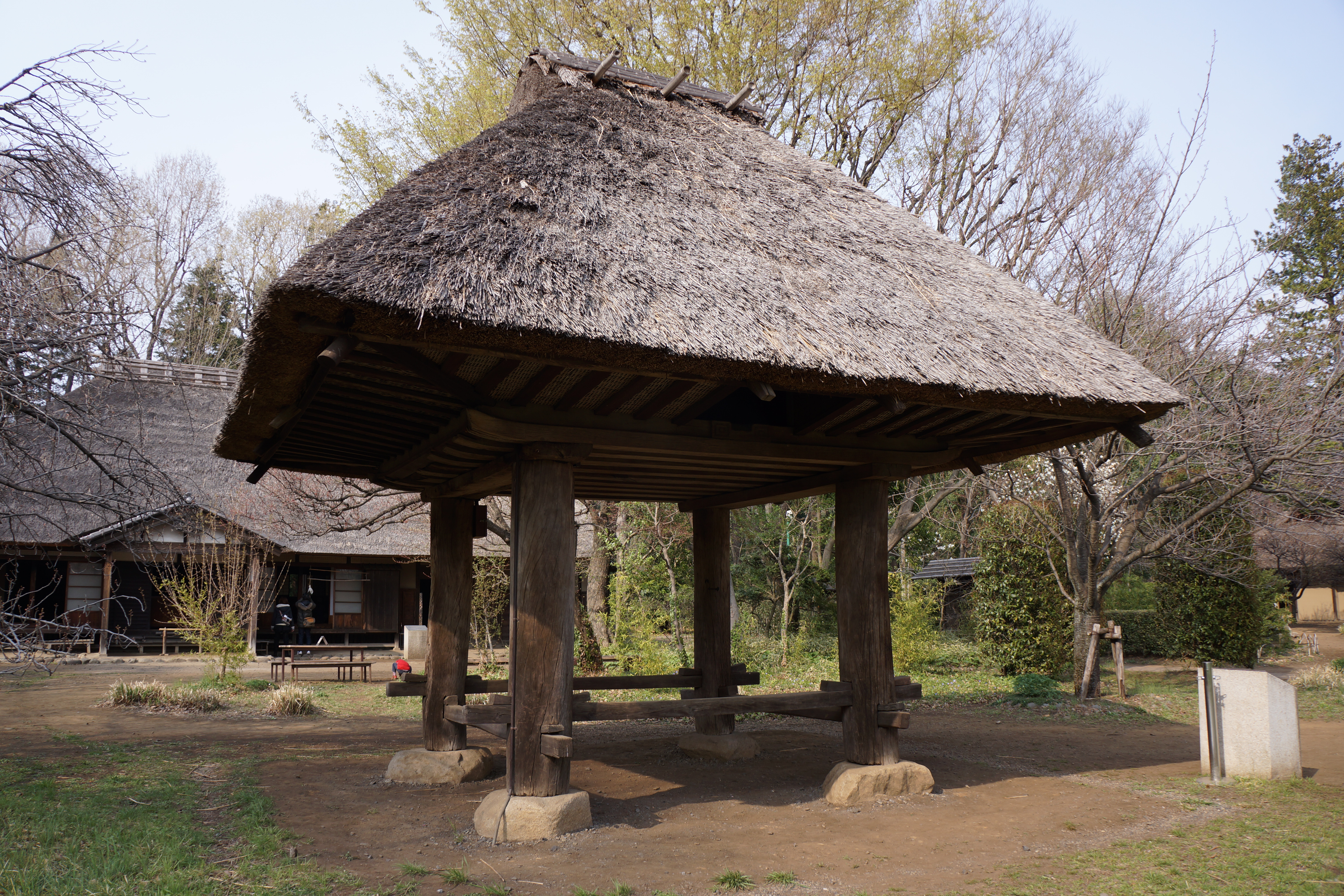
Granary in Amami

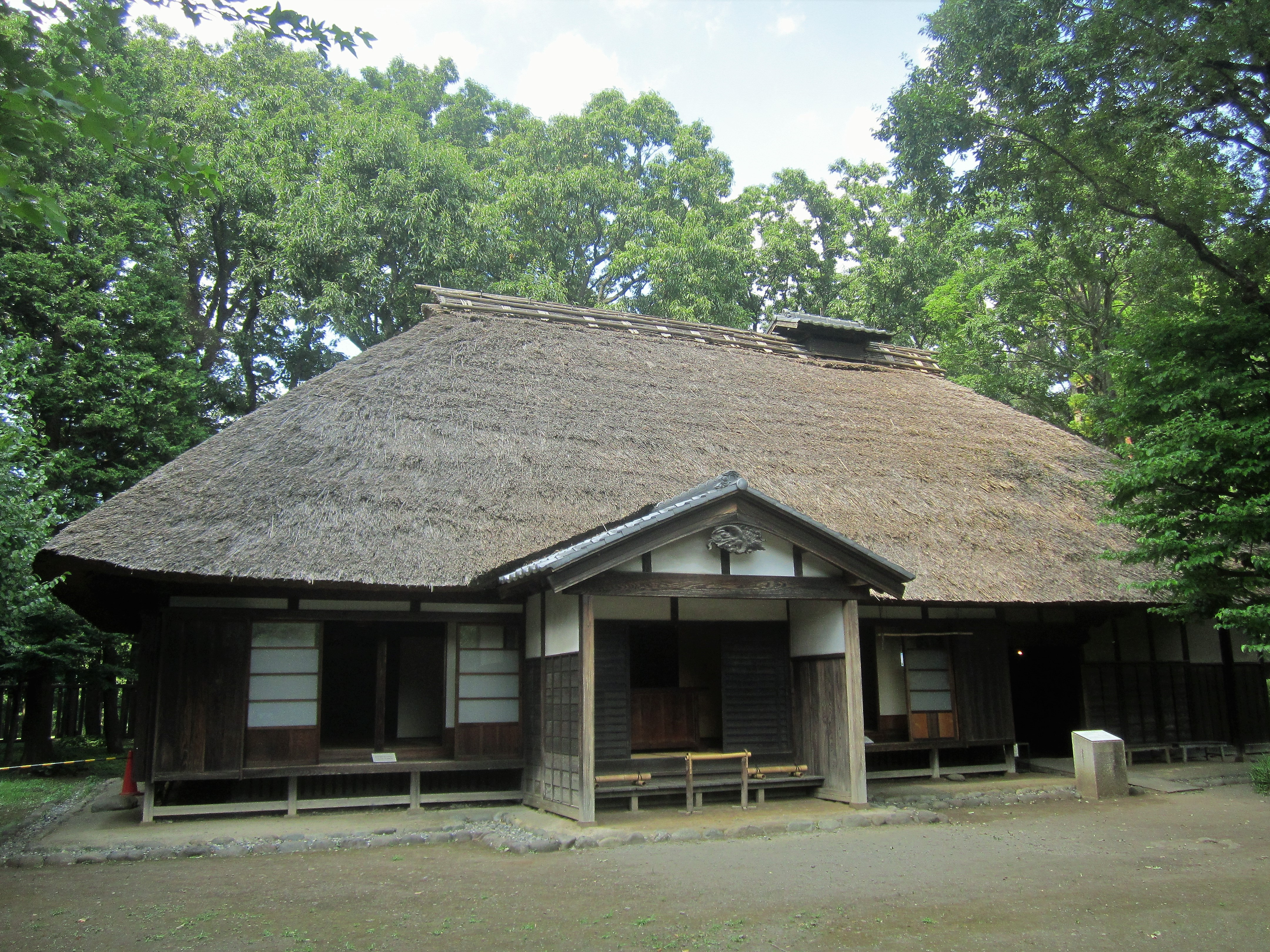
Farmhouse of Yoshino Family

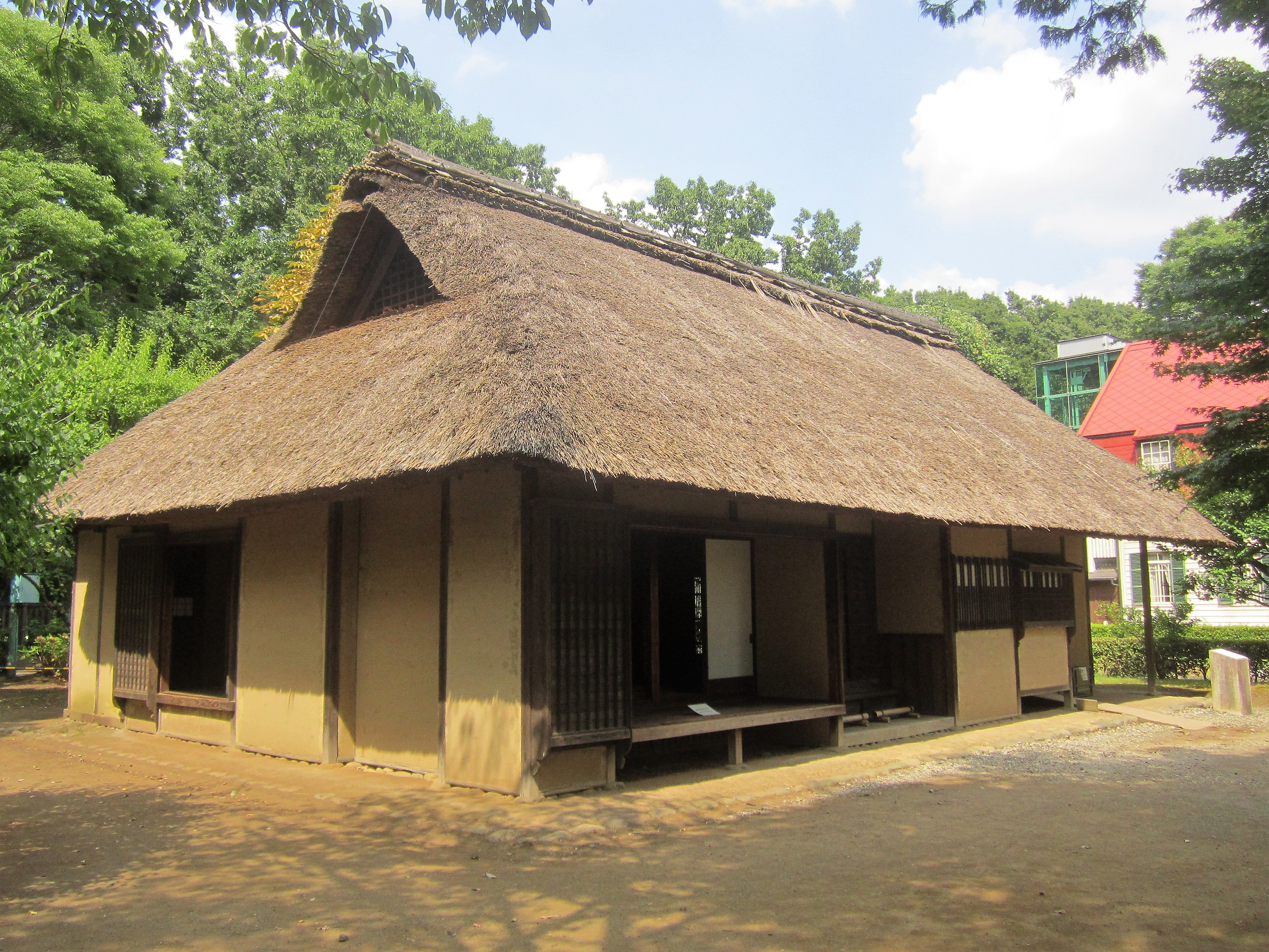
House of Leader of Hachioji Guards

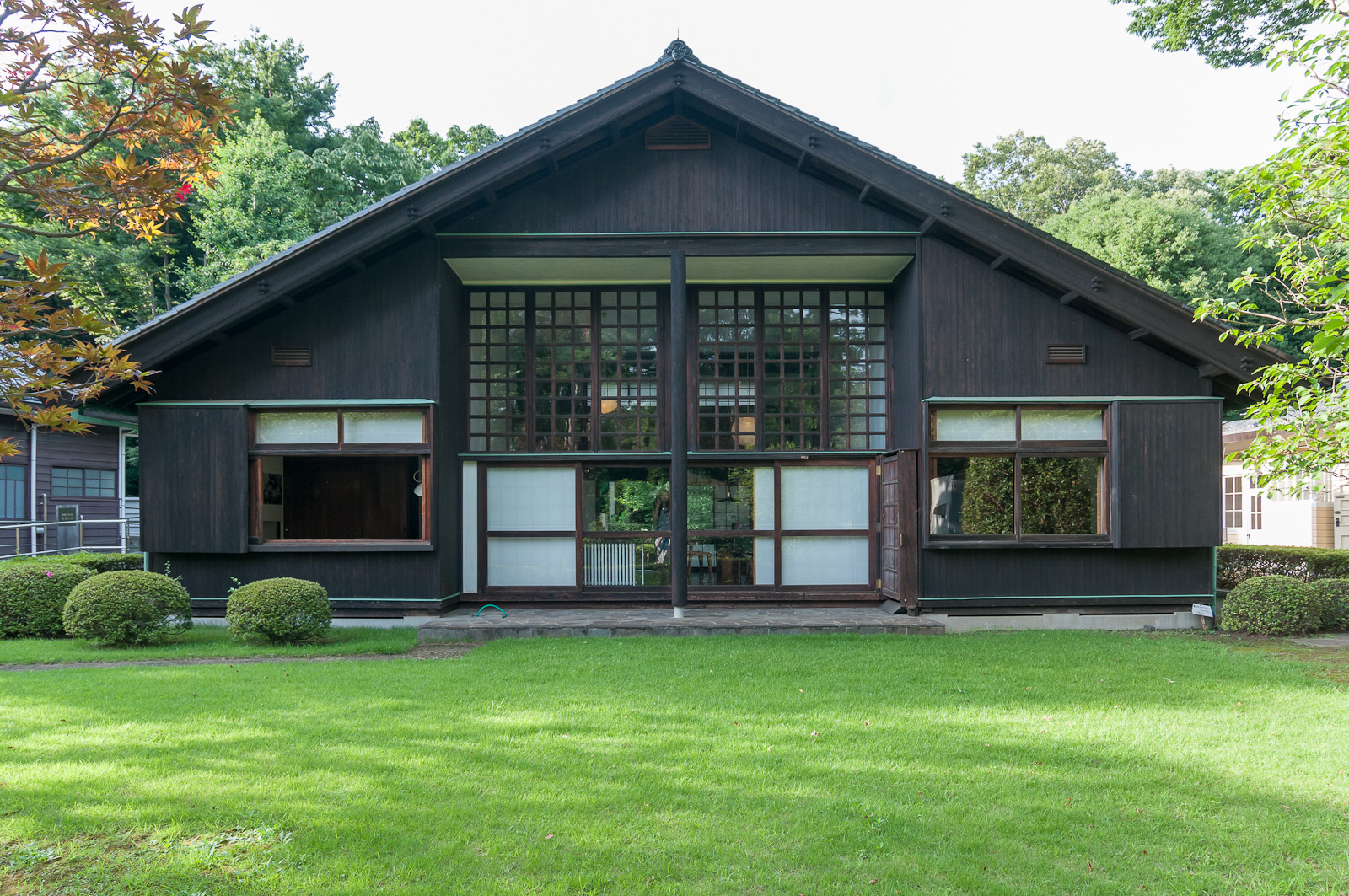
Kunio Maekawa's residence

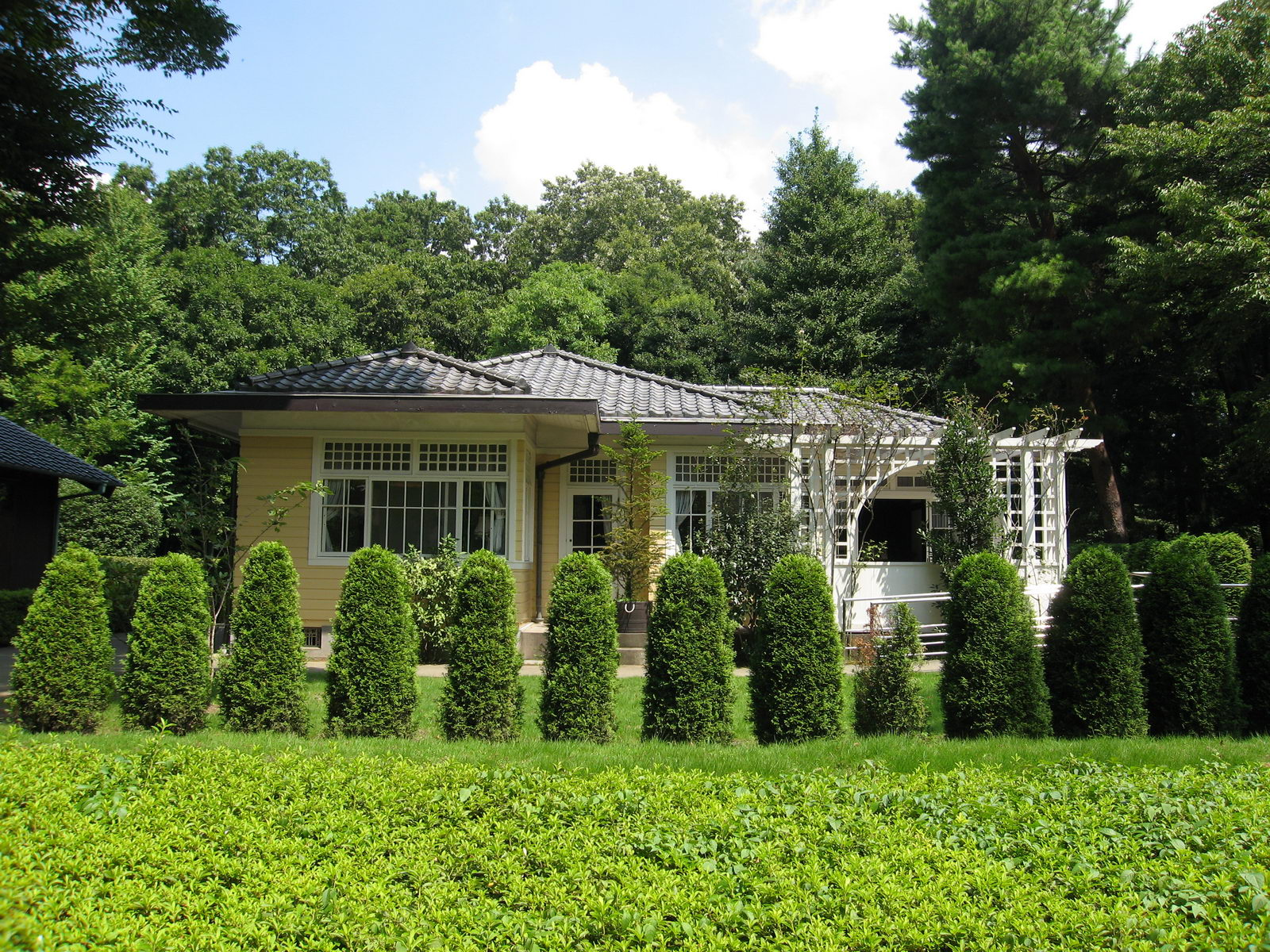
Denenchofu House (Okawa House)

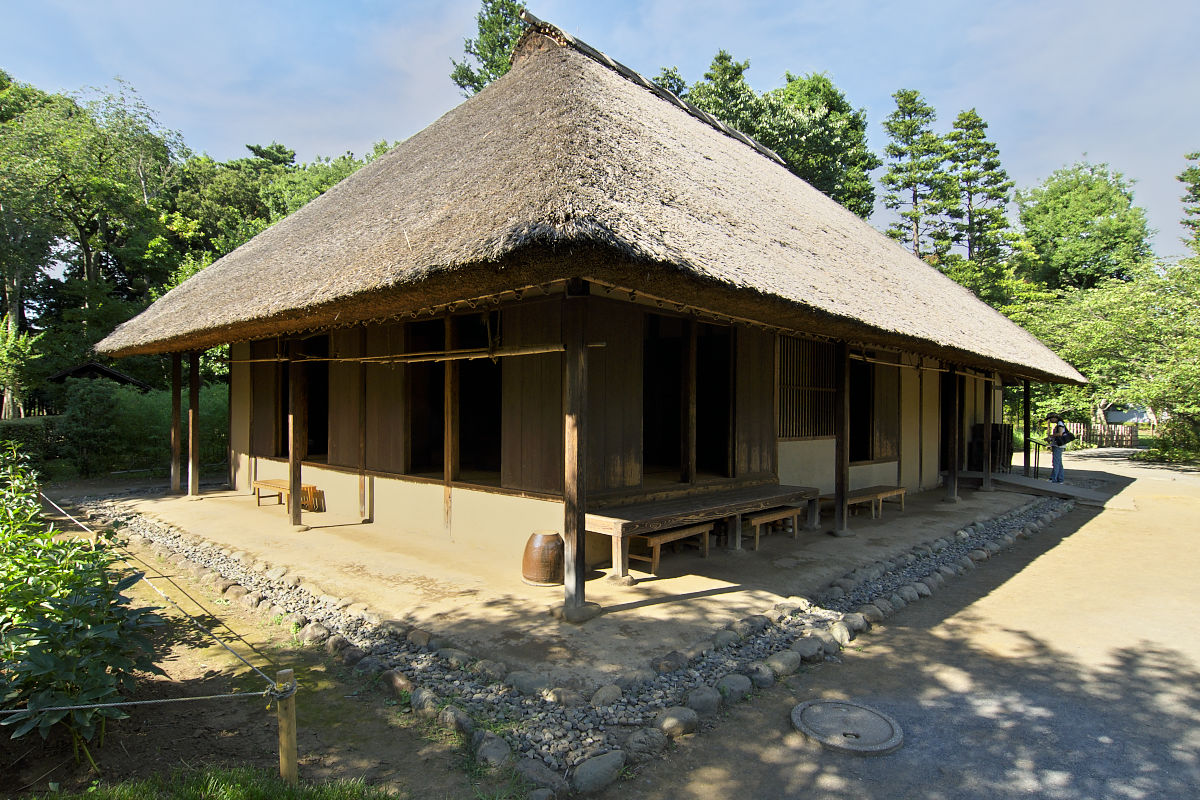
Farmhouse of Tsunashima Family

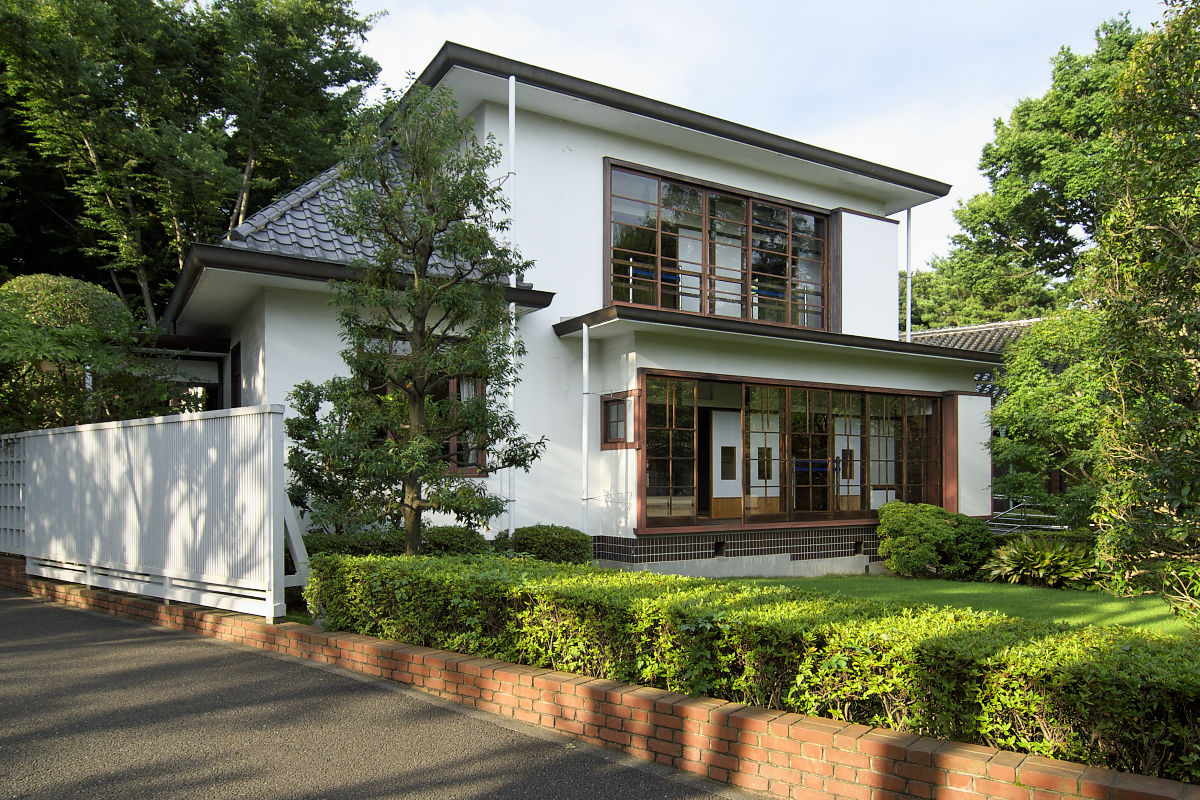
House of Koide

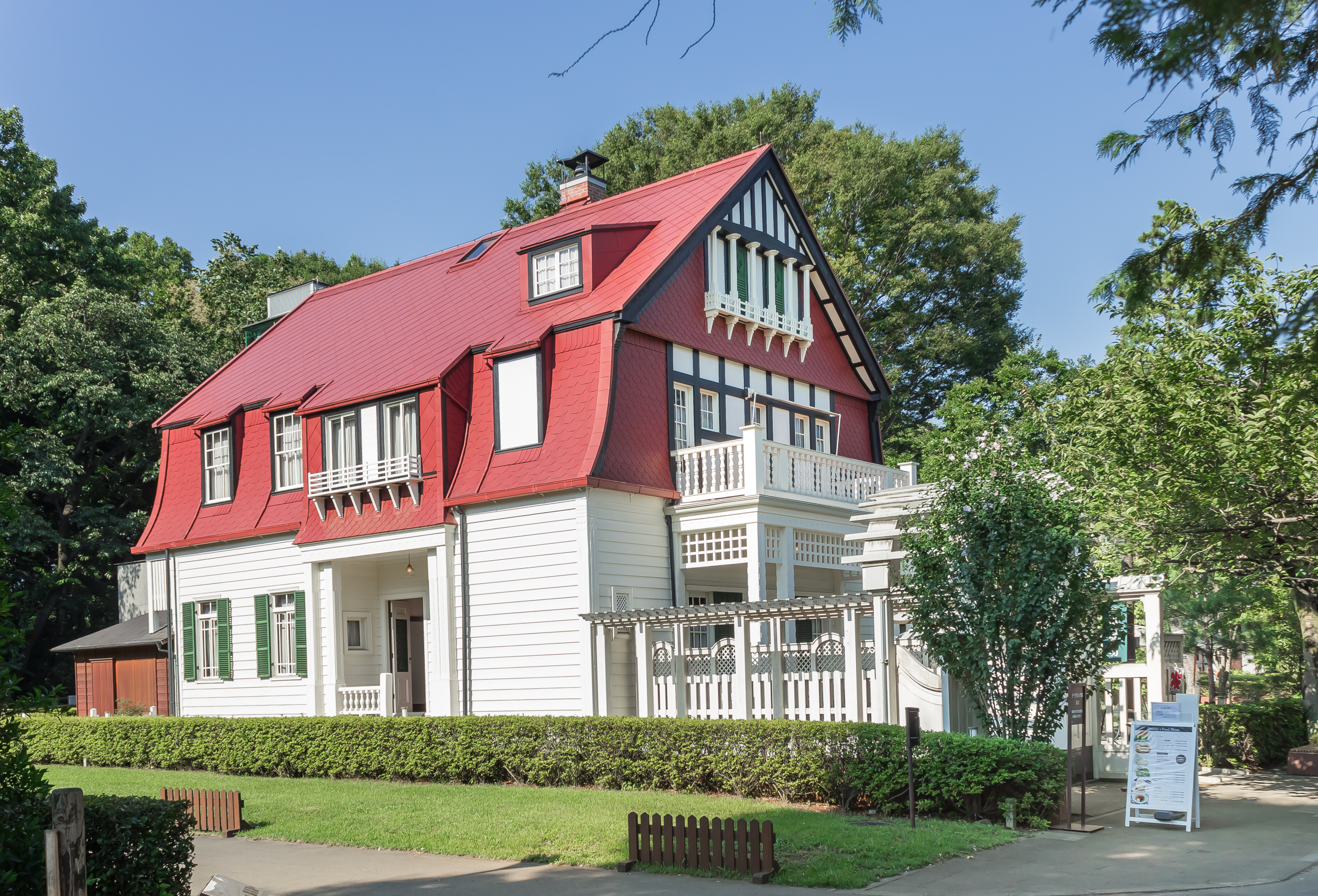
House of De Lalande

=== East Zone ===
- Tenmei family (farm house): A prestigious farm house with a Nagayamon (traditional Japanese gate style, 長屋門), where a wealthy farmer lived from the Edo period.
- Odera Shoyu Store: A merchant house made of girders. They sold sake, miso, and soy sauce by weight. The inside of the store reproduces the situation in the latter half of the Showa 30's.
- Kagiya (Izakaya): A popular izakaya in Shitaya, Taitō-ku (built in 1856).
- Kodakara-yu: A Sentō (public bathhouse) built in a palace in Senju, Adachi-ku ( built in 1929).
- Tailor: A townhouse made of girders. The interior recreates the workplace of a tailor in the Taisho era.
- Takei Sanshodou (Stationery Store): A stationery store in Kanda. Signboard architecture.
- Flower City Flower Shop: A flower shop in Kanda. Signboard architecture. Reliefs are applied to the copper plate of the façade.
- Manseibashi alternating: Manseibashi of the foot, the former Manseibashi Station near to there was brick of alternating. The year of completion is unknown, but it is estimated to be in the late Meiji era.
- Uemura House: A copper-plated signboard in Shintomicho.
- Maruji Shoten (Rough goods store): A rough goods store in Kanda Jimbocho (daily necessities store). Signboard architecture. The façade is finished with a copper plate using the Edo Komon pattern.
- Murakami Seikado (cosmetics store): A booth store in Ikenohata. Signboard architecture. The appearance that combines the Ionic order- style colonnades and the tile-roofed Japanese-style roof is unique.
- Kawano Shoten (Japanese umbrella wholesaler): A Japanese umbrella manufacturing wholesaler with a girder structure.
- Yamatoya Main Store (Dry Food Store): A three-story wooden store in Shirokanedai, Minato-ku.
- Mantoku Ryokan: A ryokan located along the Ōme Kaidō in Nishiwake-cho, Ōme City. The building has been restored to its original appearance, and the interior has been restored to its appearance around 1950.
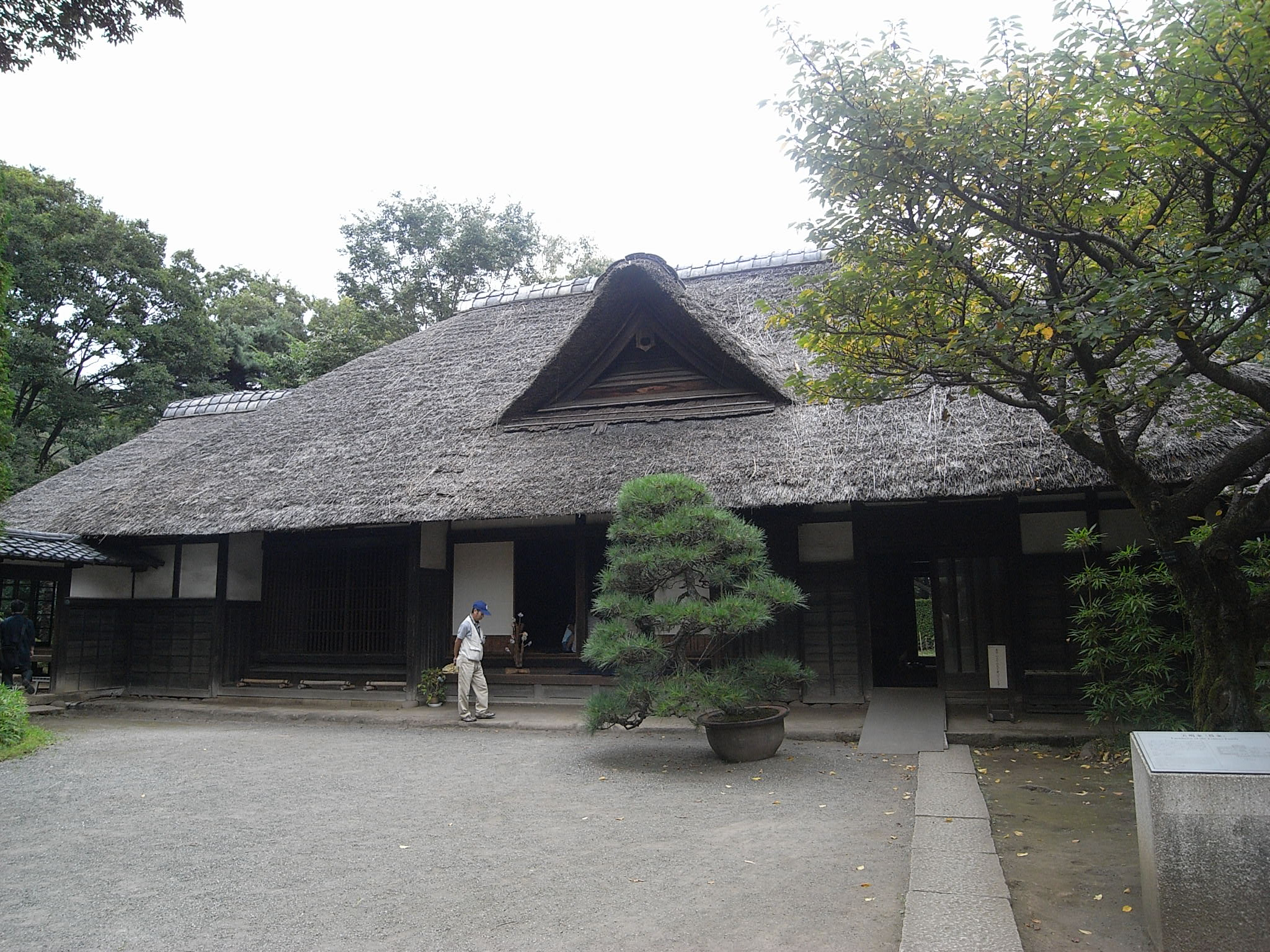
Farmhouse of Tenmyō Family

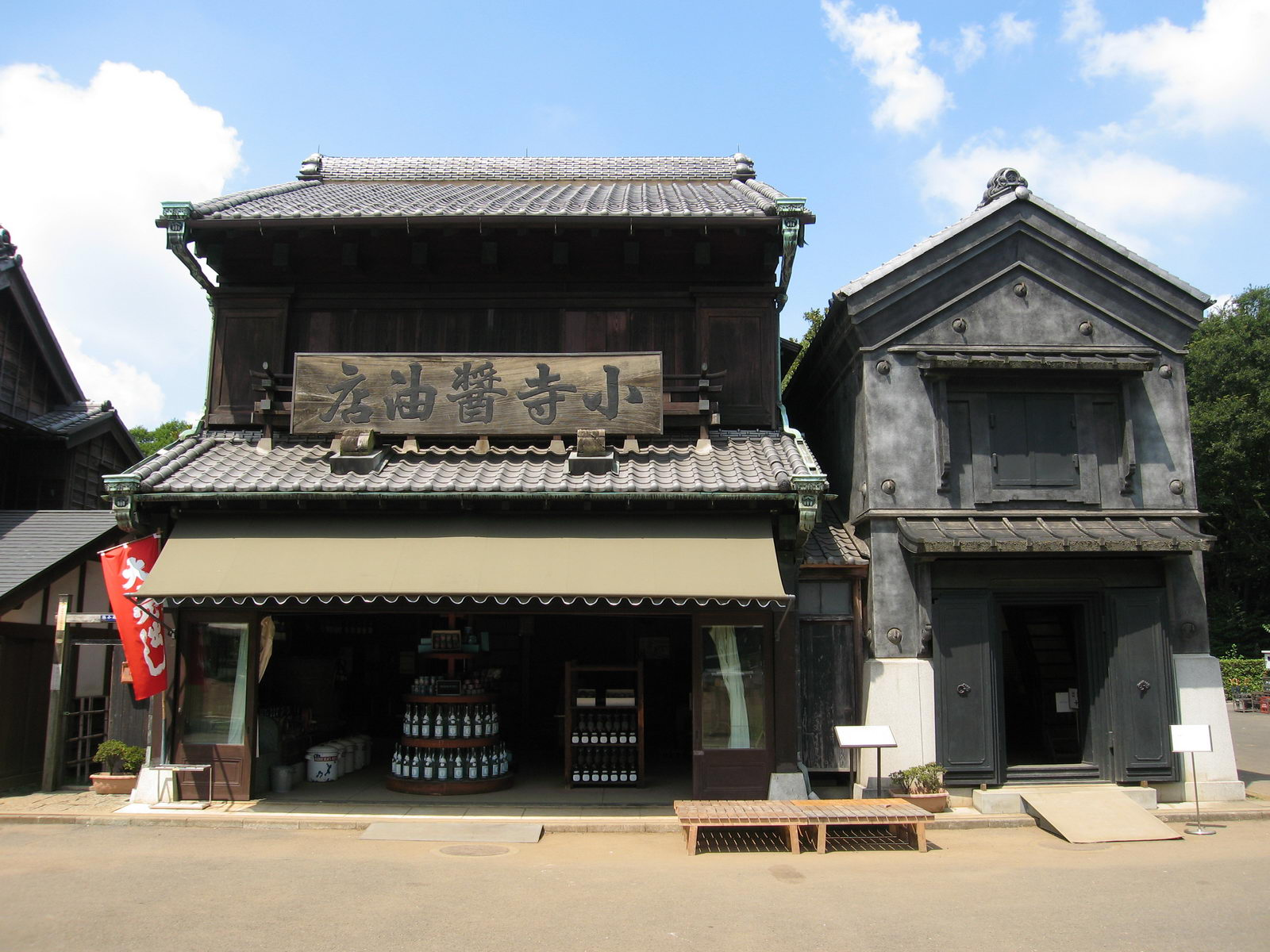
Kodera Soy Sauce Store

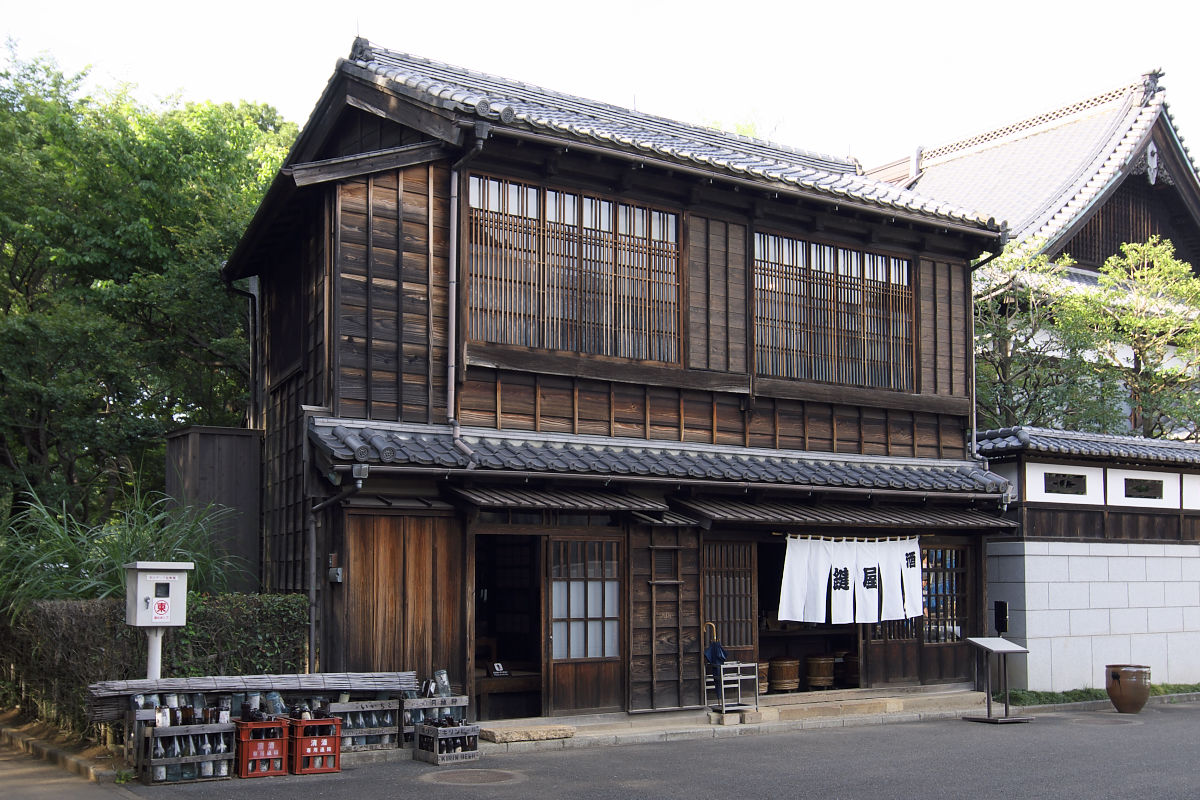
Kagiya bar (izakaya)

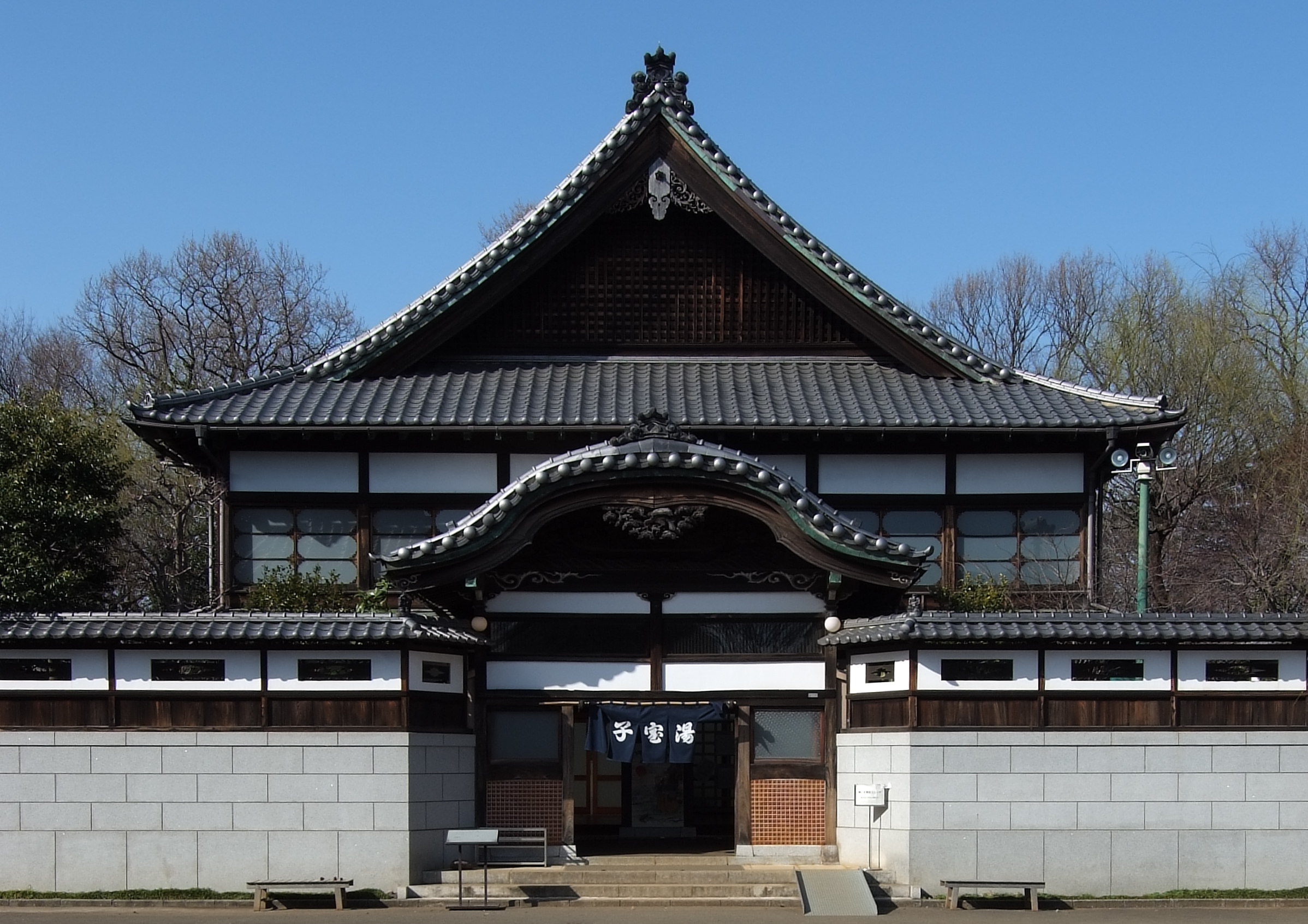
Kodakara-yu (communal bathhouse)

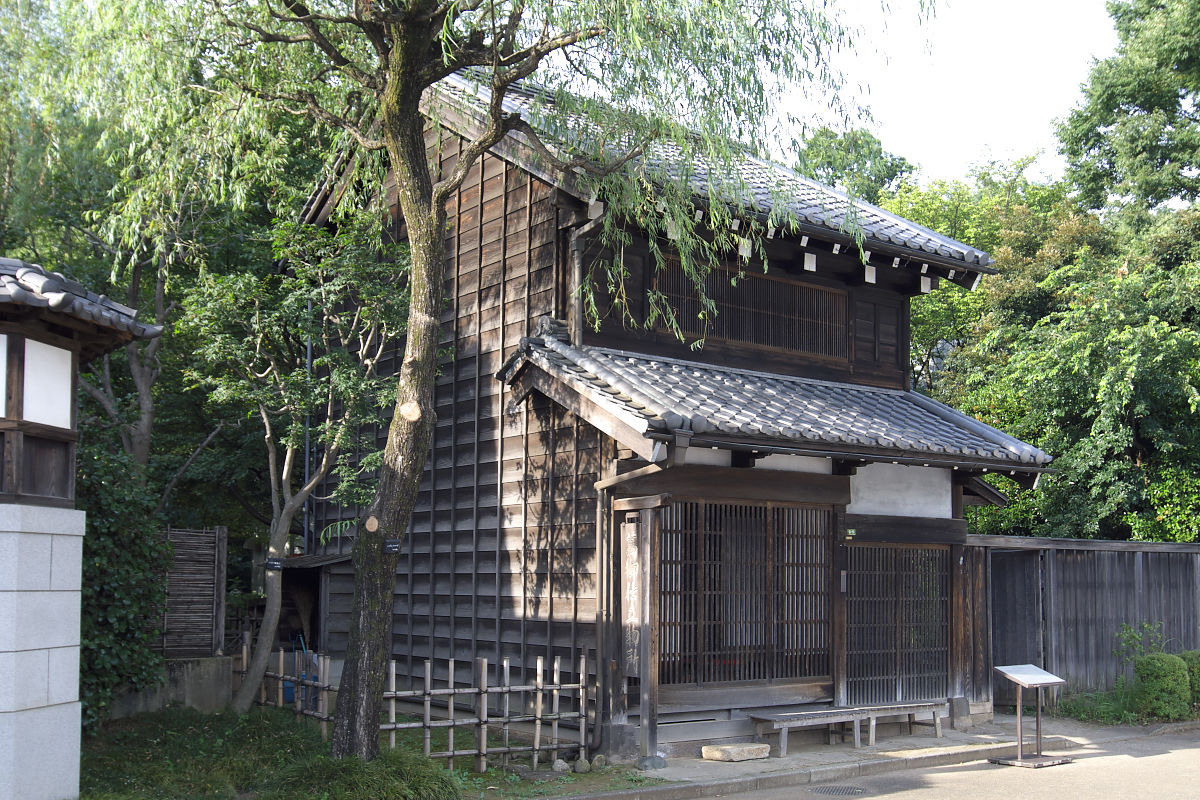
Tailors workshop

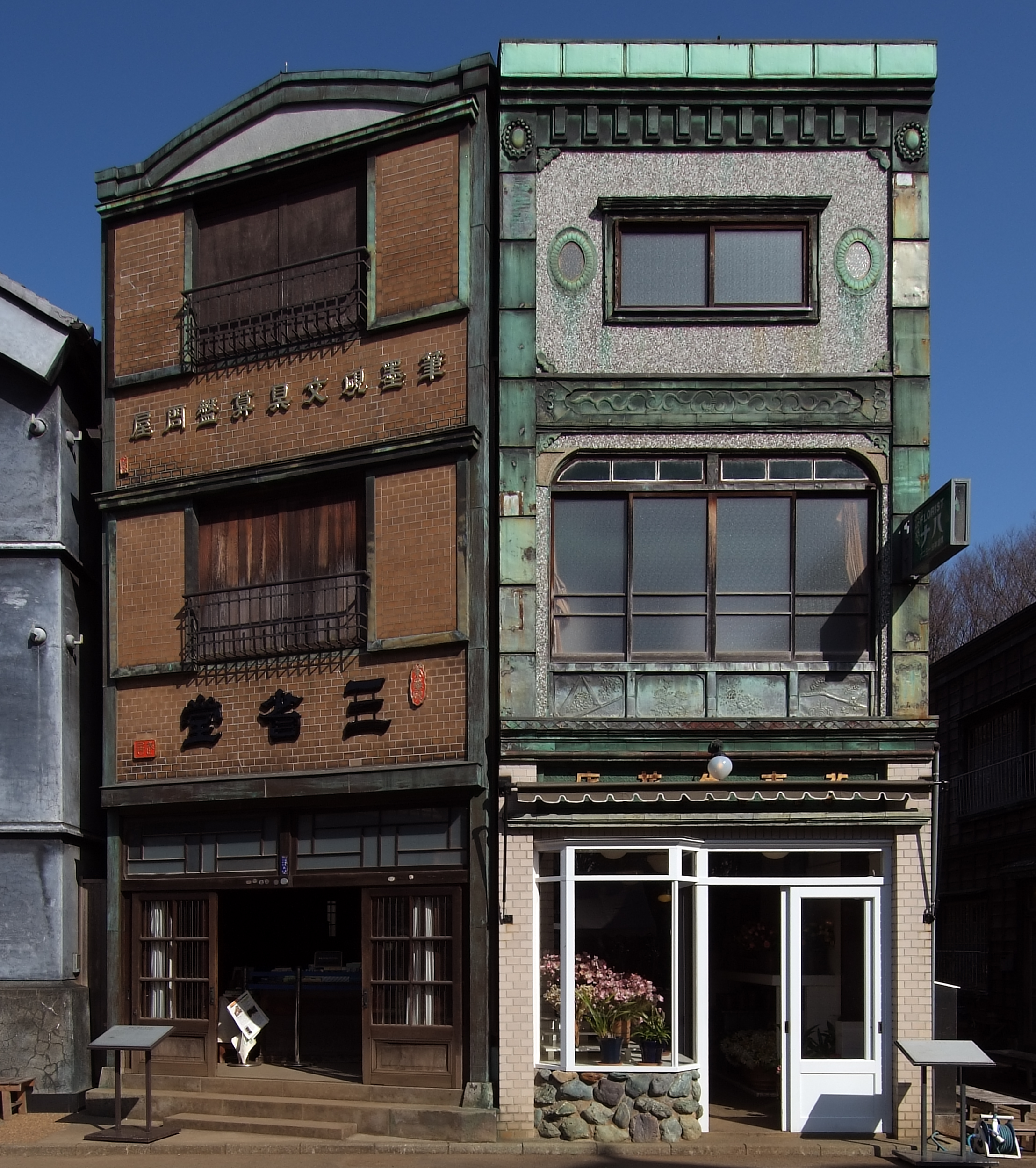
Takei Sanshōdō & Hanaichi Flower Shop

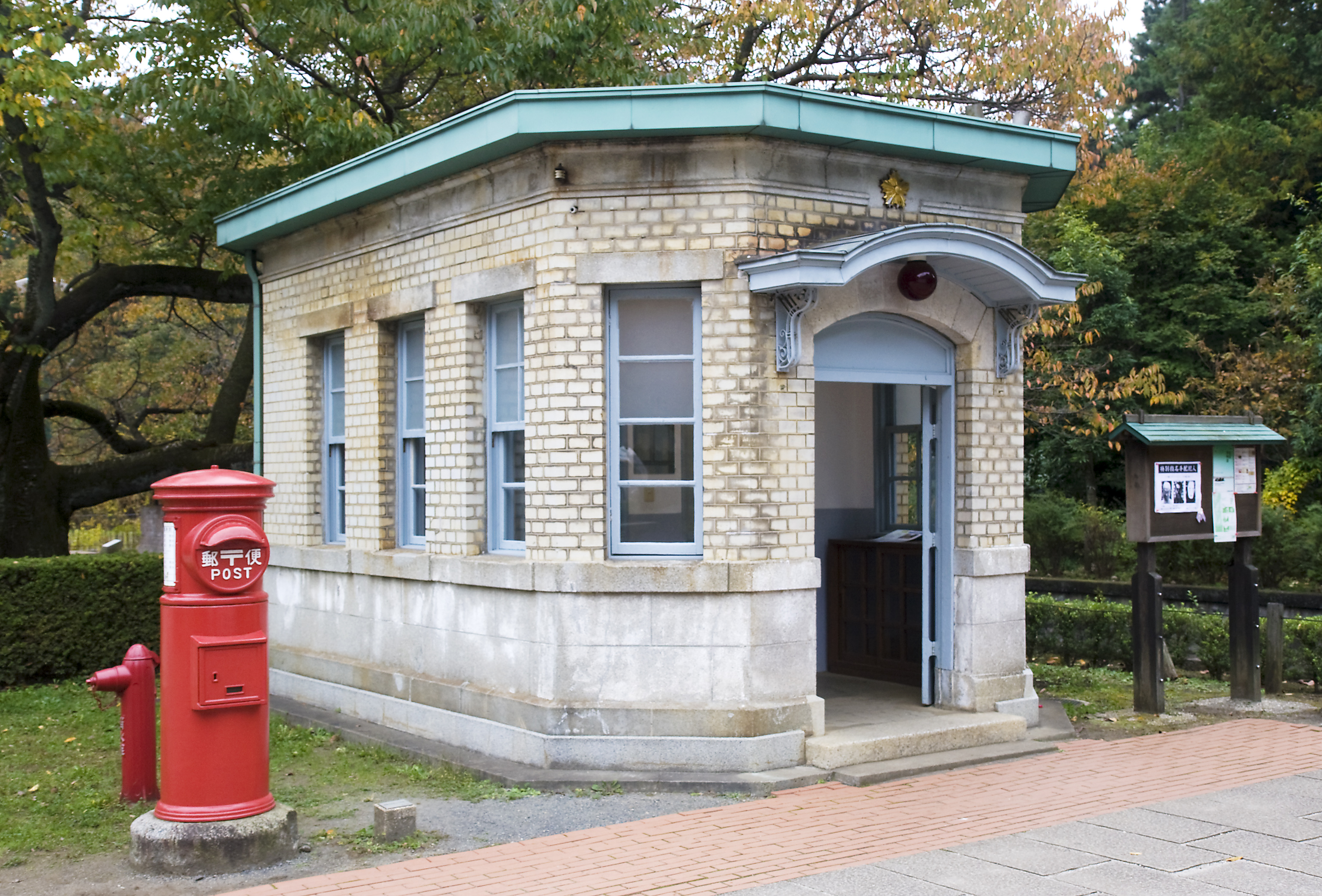
Kōban (police box) from Sudō-chō (Manseibashi)

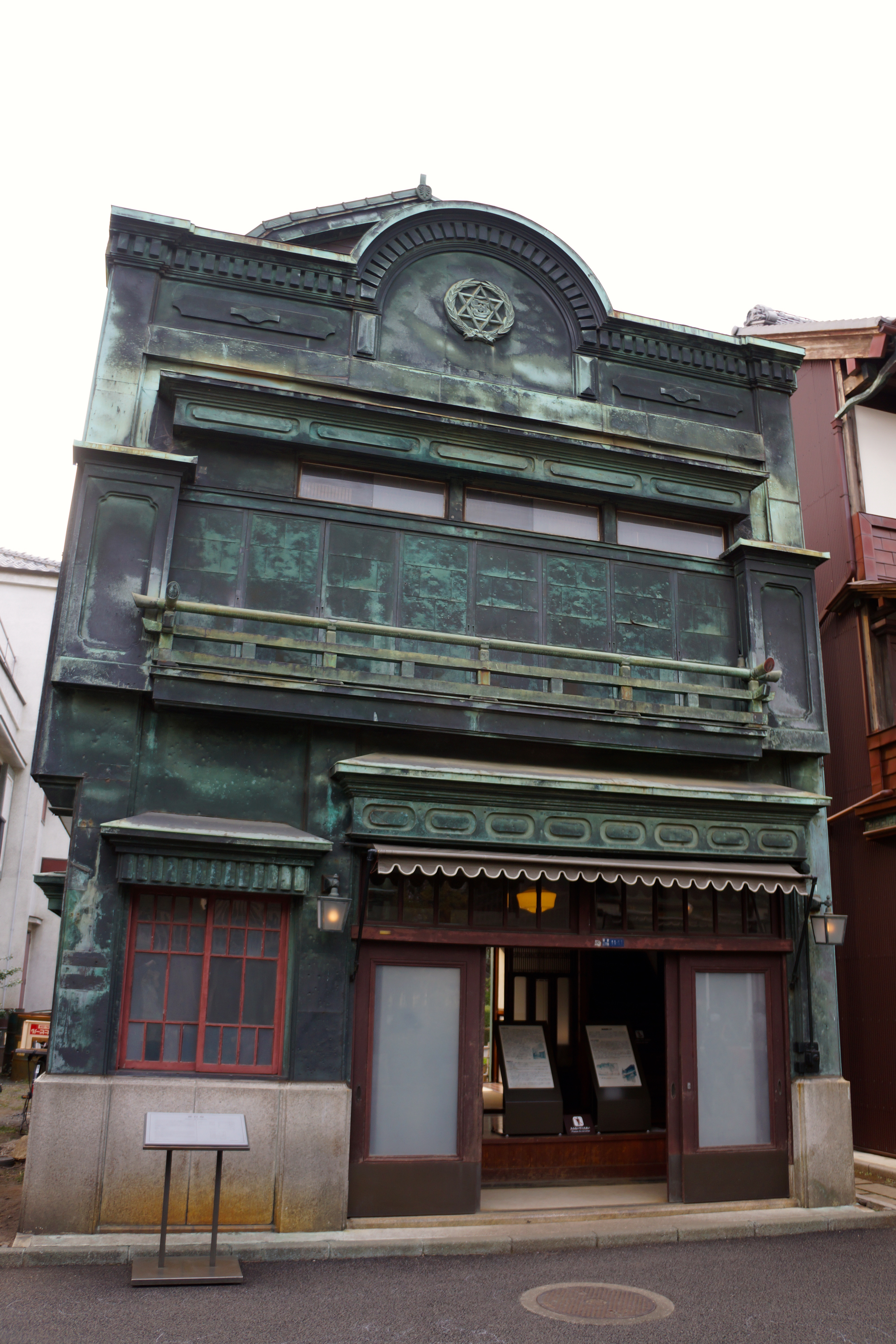
Uemura House

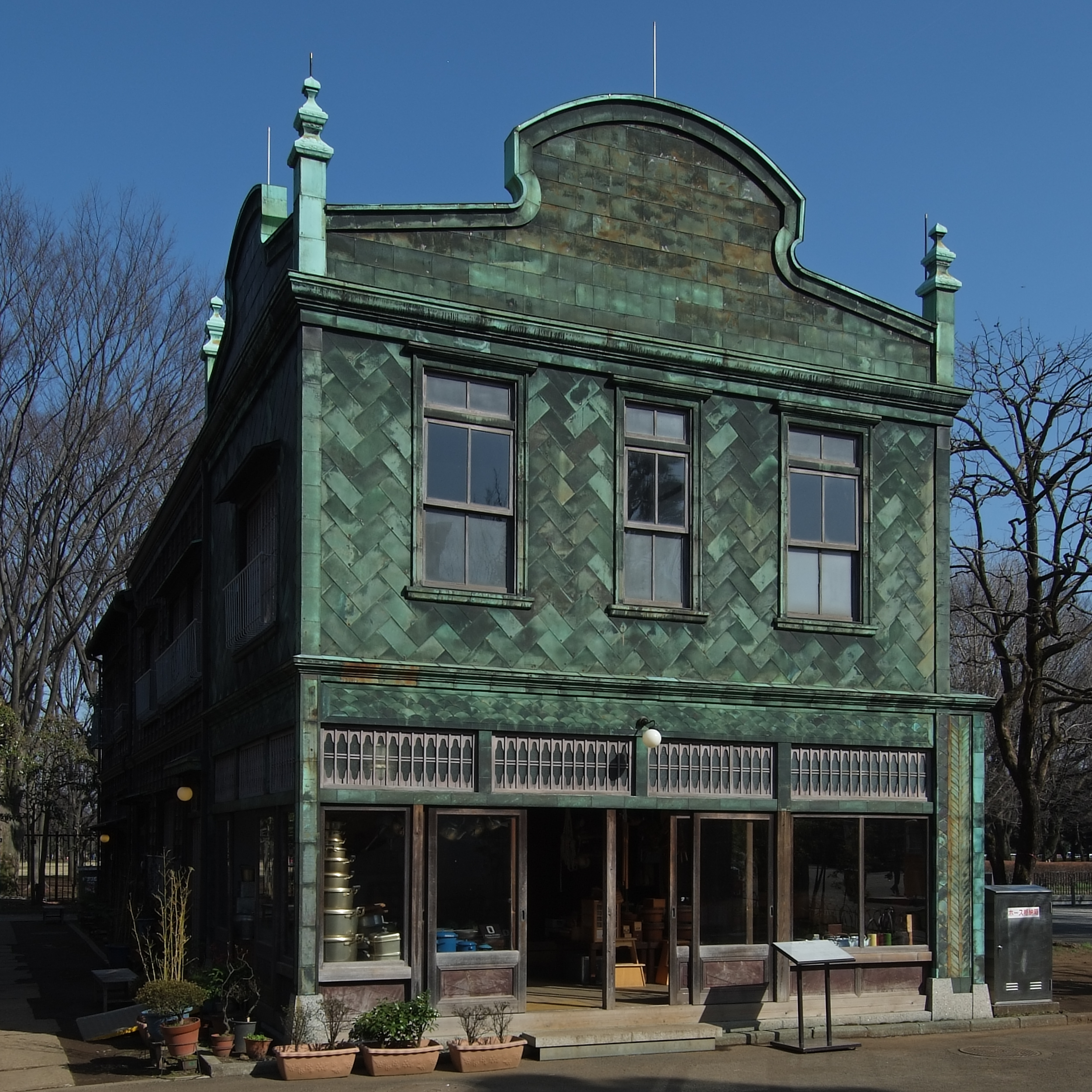
Maruni Shōten (shop)

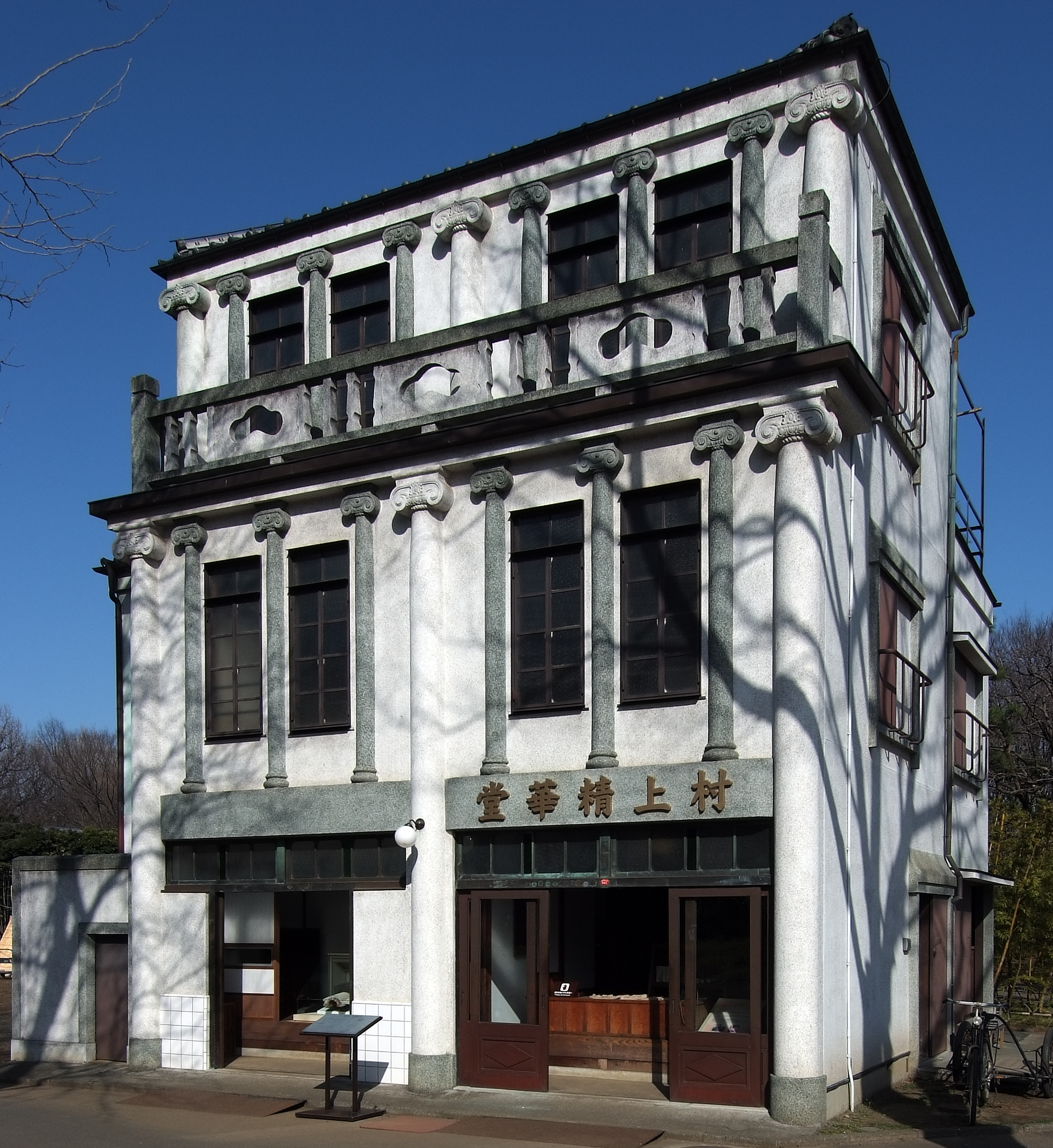
Murakami Seikadō (cosmetics store)

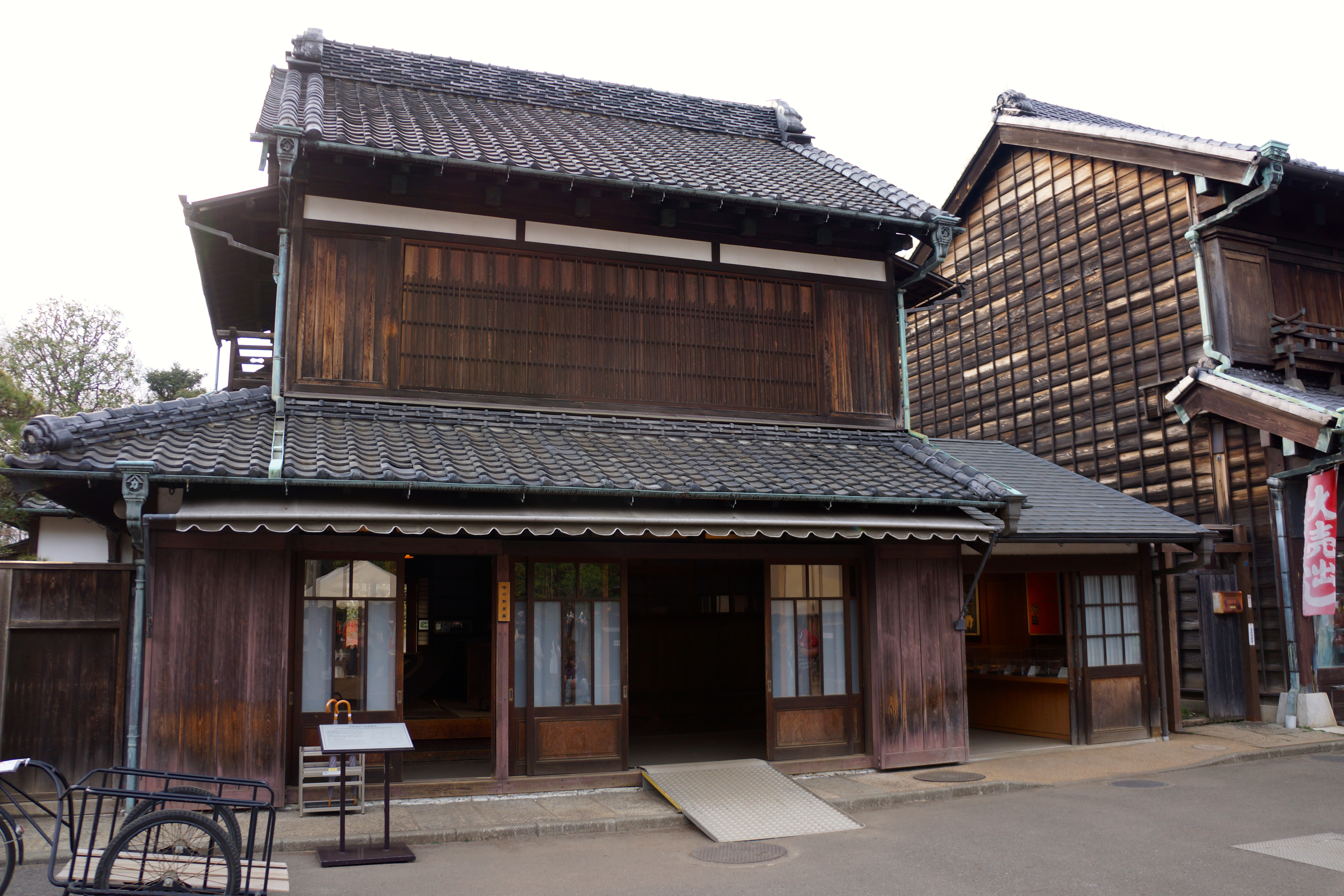
Kawano Shōten (Japanese umbrella wholesaler)

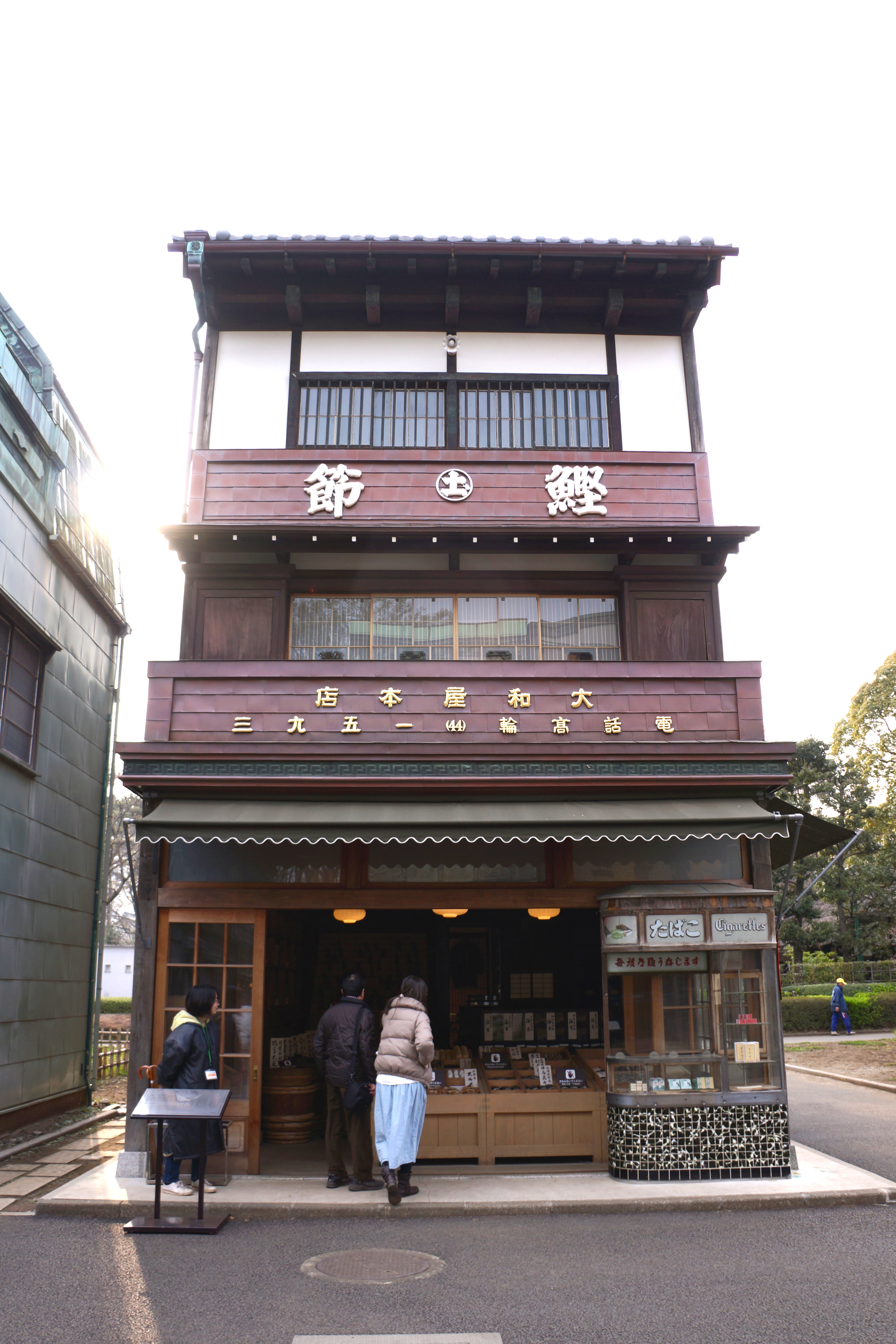
Yamatoya Main Store

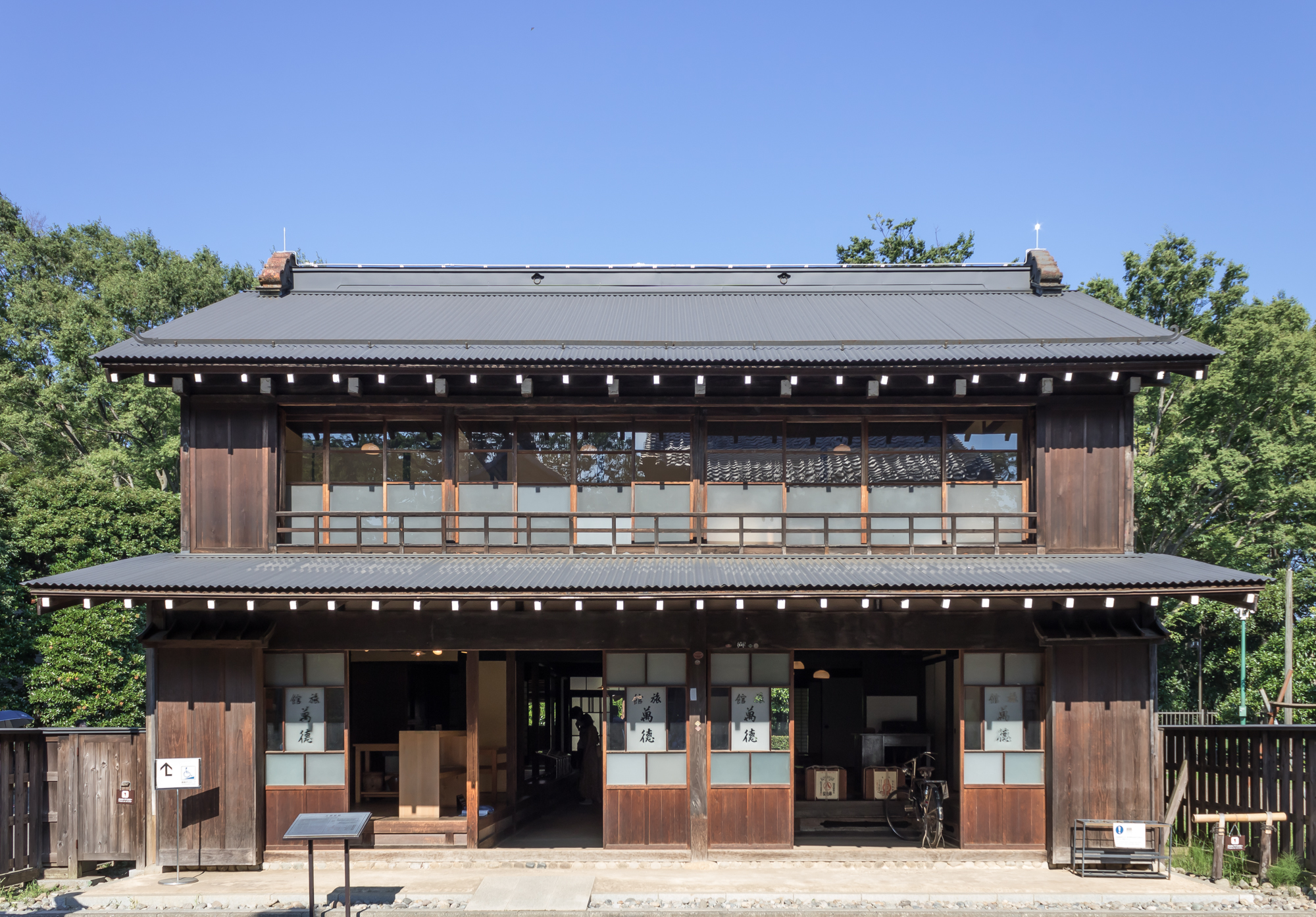
Mantoku Ryokan

== Outdoor exhibits ==
The following outdoor exhibits are part of the museum's collection.

- Toei 7500 series train No. 7514: 1962 of manufacturing Tokyo Toden tram (scrapped in 1978). Since it was not remodeled into a one-person operation, it retains its original shape at the time of manufacture.
- Bonnet bus Isuzu TSD43 ( dynamics saved ): 1968 formula, Kitamura Mfg body. Originally used by the Japan Air Self-Defense Force, it used to be a Toei bus paint that was changed when the movie appeared, but now it is the same cream paint as the Toden. Privately owned. Since it is a sightseeing vehicle limited to running in the park, it does not have a license plate. Although the park was operated on holidays (drivers and conductors may wear the uniforms of the Japanese National Railways on board), it is not operating as of 2011 due to maintenance problems such as aging.
- Imperial Palace Main Gate Ishibashi Ornamental Lamp: One of the six ornamental lamps installed on the parapet of the Imperial Palace Main Gate Ishibashi (on the front side of the Nijūbashi bridge). Manufactured around 1886 (Meiji 20). Due to aging, a lamp of the same shape was manufactured and replaced in 1986 (Showa 61). The same thing is exhibited in the Meiji-mura museum.
- Ueno Fire Station (former Shimotani Fire Station) Watchtower Upper part: The watchtower (Fire lookout tower) used from 1925 (Taisho 14) to 1970 (Showa 45 ). The upper 7m of the total height of 23.6m has been relocated.
- Noonday Gun: A cannon that was placed at the site of the former Honmaru in the Imperial Palace and fired a blank gun (noon gun) that signals noon. It was used until it was switched to a siren in 1929 (Showa 4).
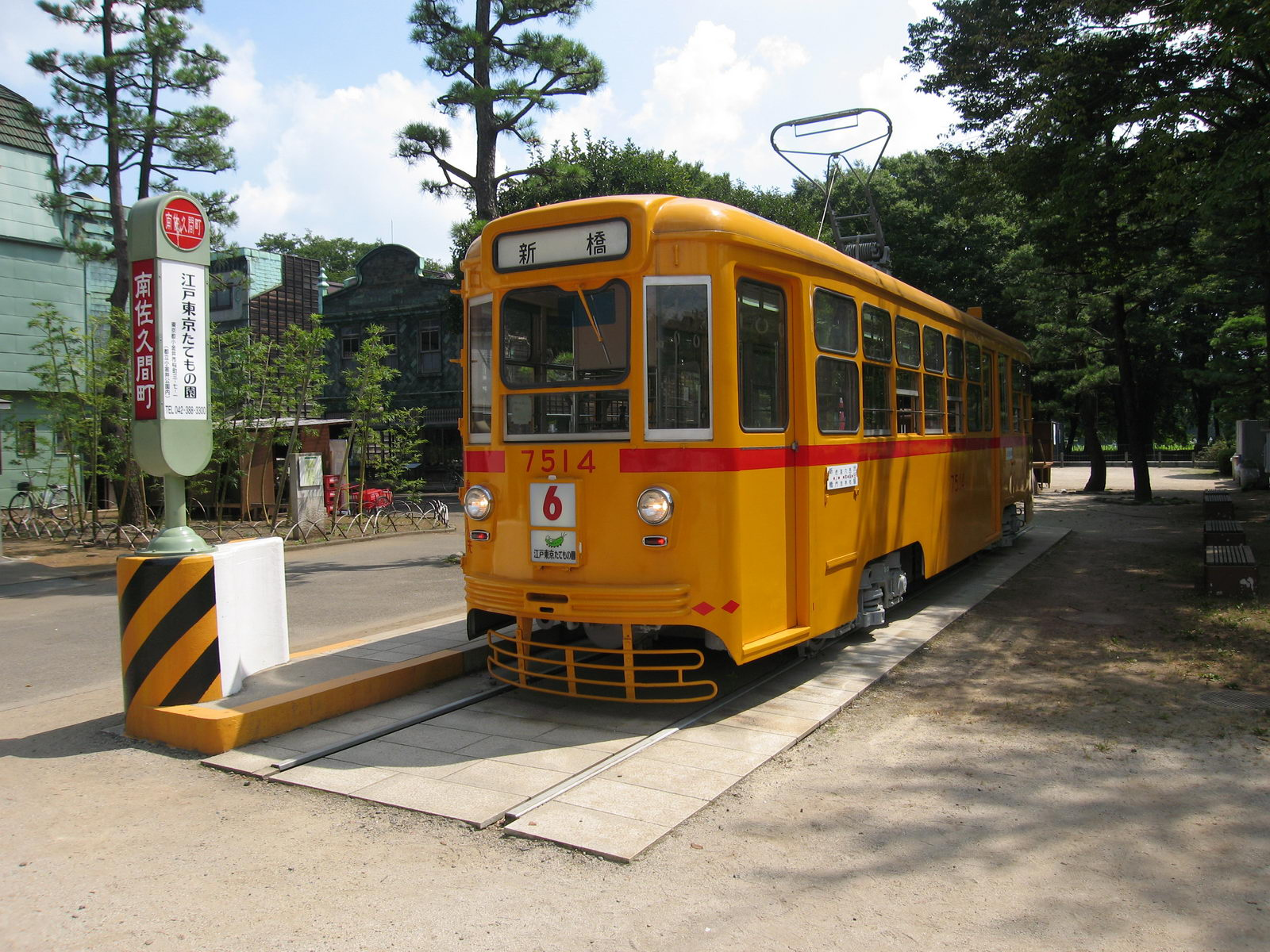
Toden 7514

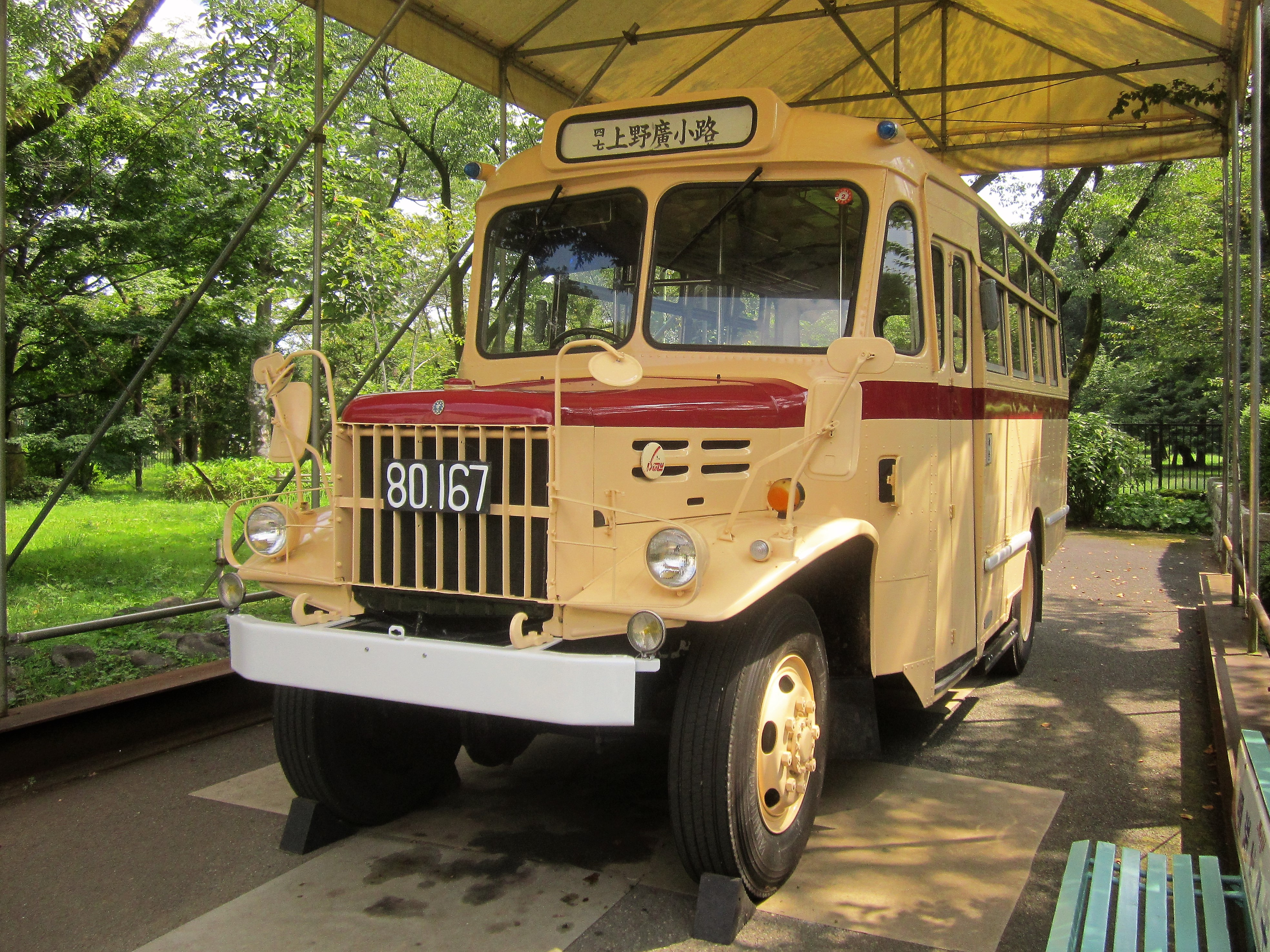
Isuzu Bonnet Bus TSD43 (newly painted)

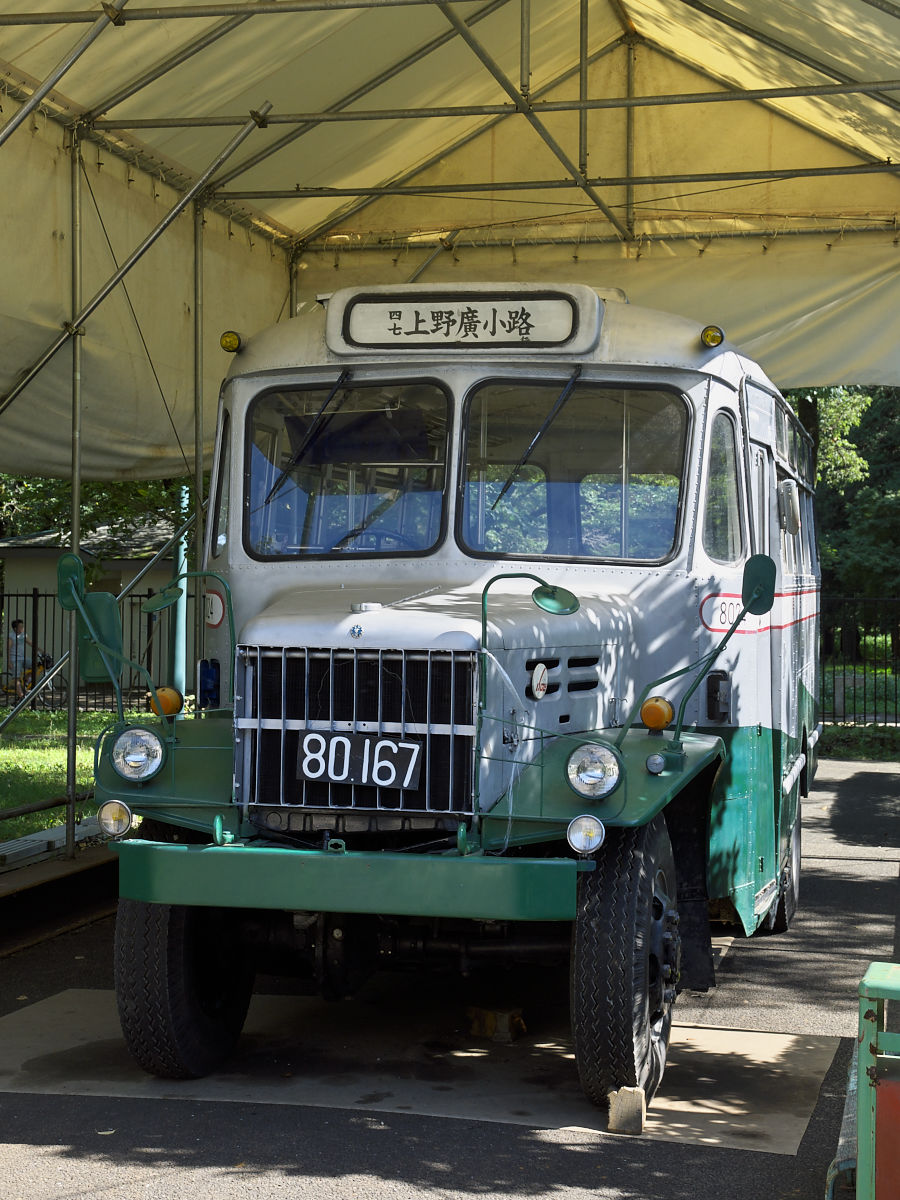
Isuzu Bonnet Bus TSD43 (old paint)

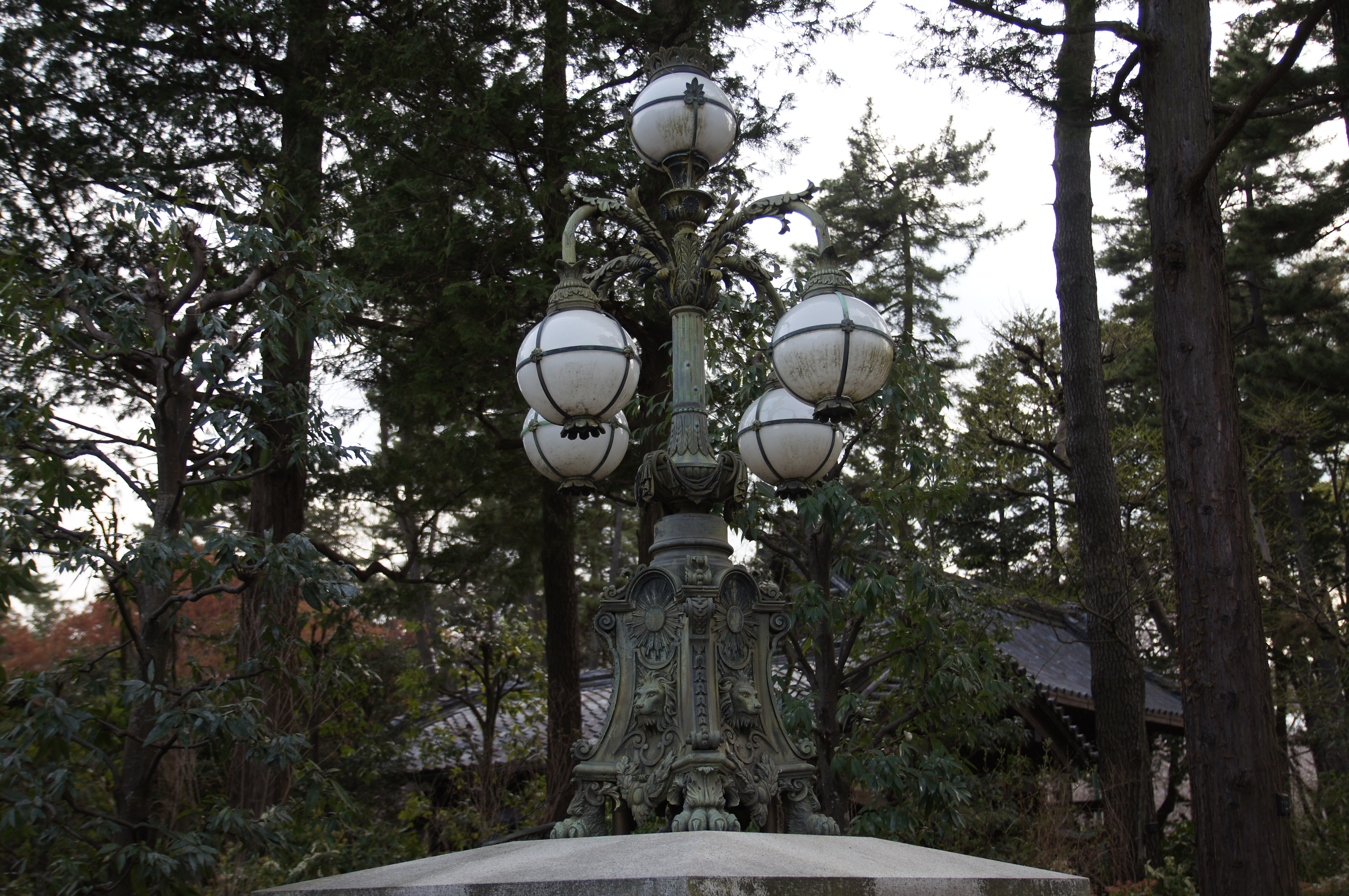
Imperial Palace Main Gate Ishibashi Ornamental Lamp

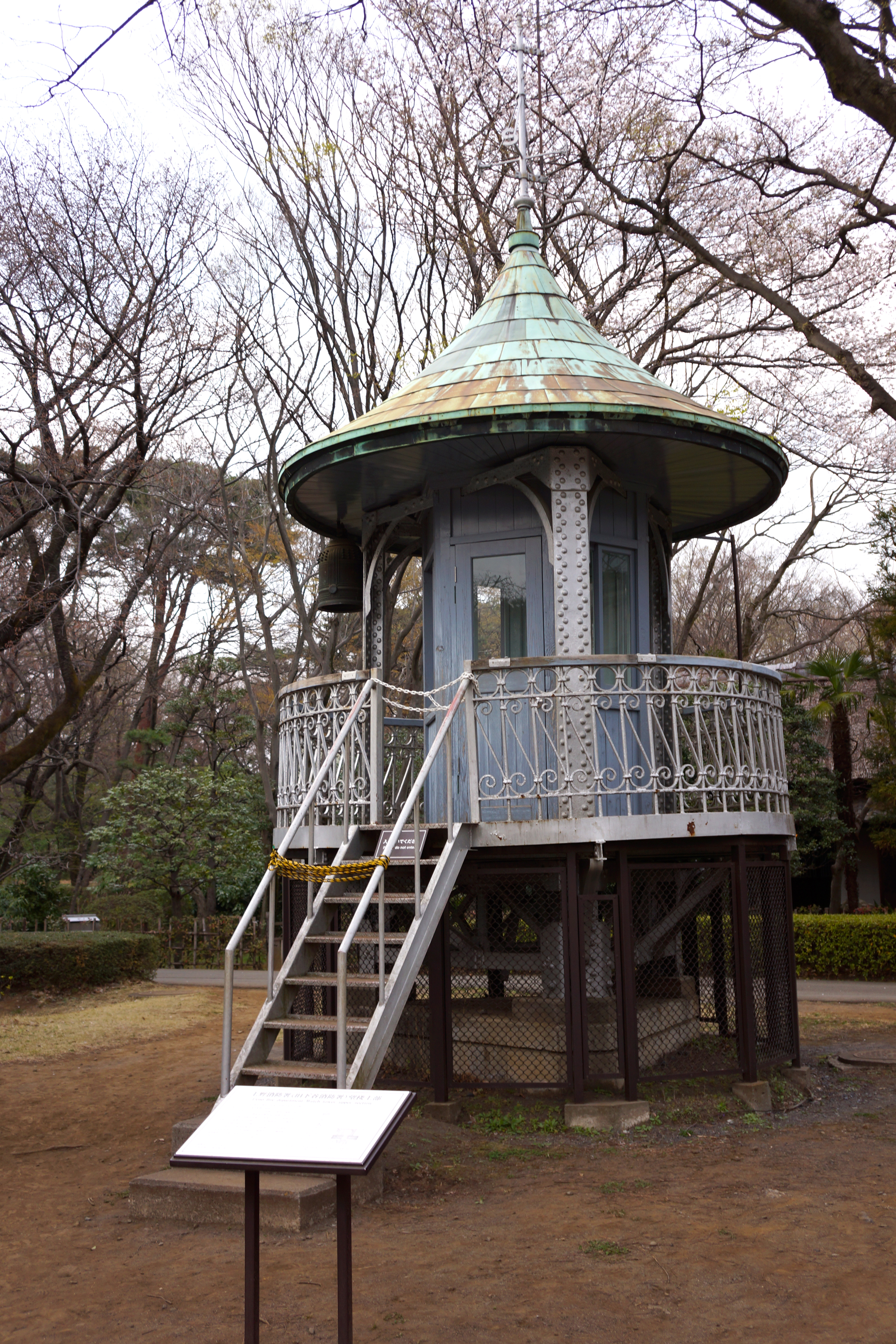
Ueno Fire Station (former Shitaya Fire Station) Upper part of the watchtower

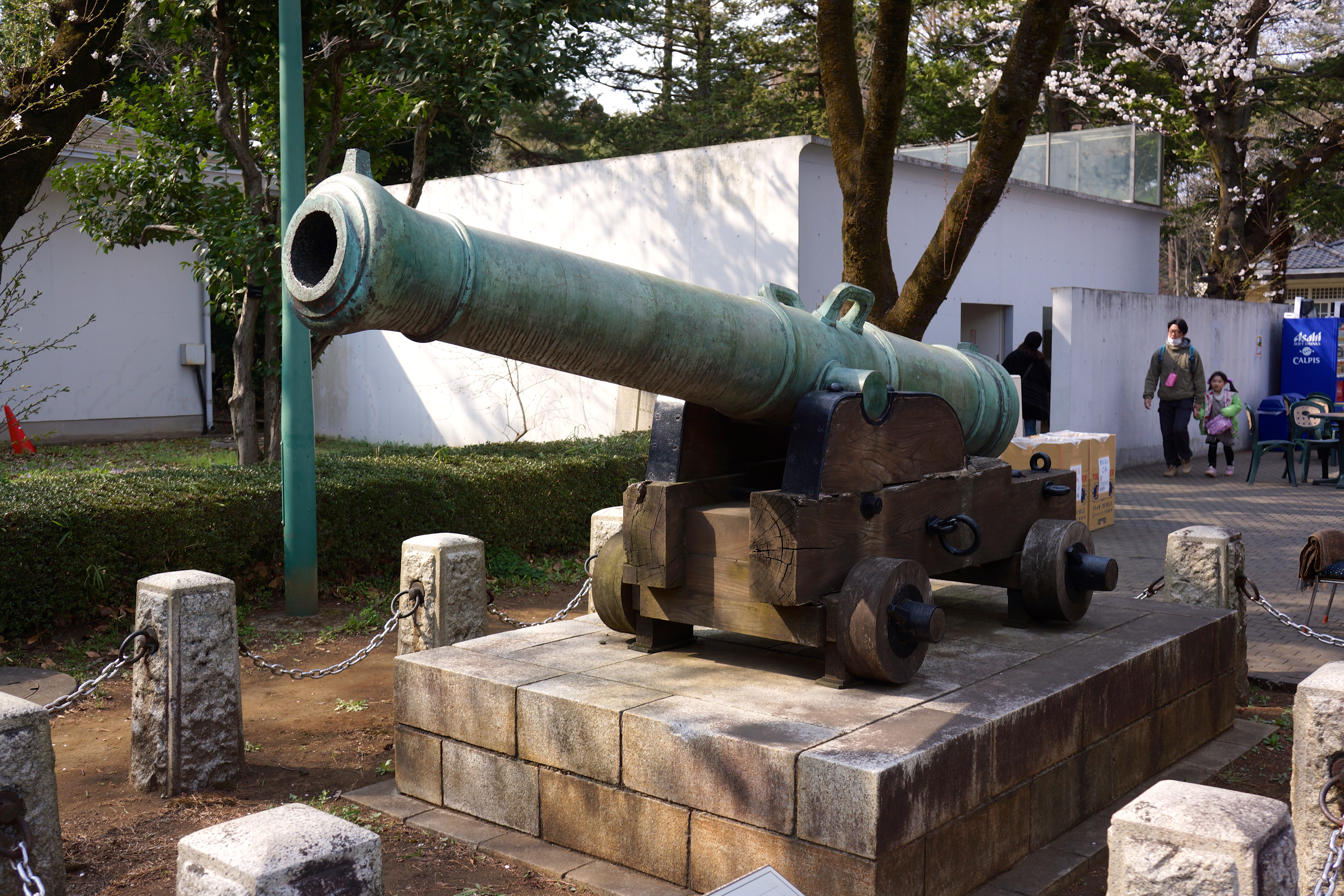
Noonday Gun

== In popular culture ==
The animator Hayao Miyazaki often visited the museum when he worked on his film Spirited Away for inspiration.. According to the Studio Ghibli diary, the "Kodorayu" (Children's Bathhouse) at the museum was an inspiration for the bathhouse setting in Spirited Away.

== See also ==
- Meiji Mura, an open-air architectural museum/theme park in Inuyama, near Nagoya in Aichi prefecture
