= International Christian University =

University in Tokyo

Coordinates: 35°41′15″N 139°31′46″E

- 国際基督教大学
- Motto: Expanding Potential
- Type: Private, Liberal Arts College
- Established: June 15, 1949
- Affiliations: Non-denominational, Ecumenical, AALAU, GLAA
- President: Shoichiro Iwakiri
- Faculty: 147
- Undergraduates: 2,934
- Postgraduates: 237
- Location: Mitaka, Tokyo, Japan
- Campus: Suburban; 153 wooded acres
- Language: Japanese; English
- Nickname: ICU
- Website: www.icu.ac.jp

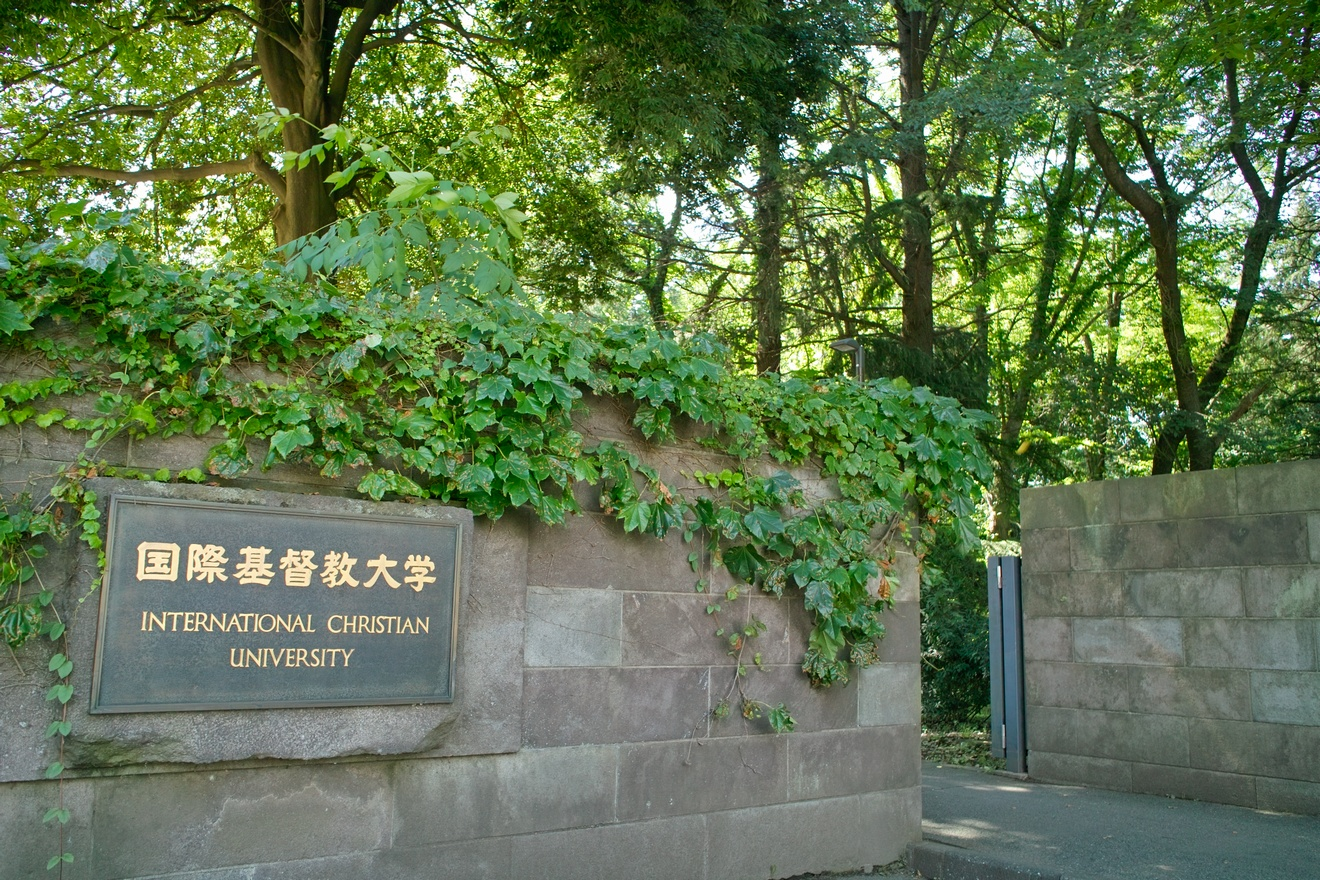
The Front Gate of ICU

International Christian University (Japanese: 国際基督教大学, Hepburn: Kokusai Kirisutokyō Daigaku; ICU) is a non-denominational private university located in Mitaka, Tokyo. With the efforts of Prince Takamatsu, General Douglas MacArthur, and BOJ Governor Hisato Ichimada, ICU was established in 1949 as the first liberal arts college in Japan. Currently the university offers 31 undergraduate majors and a graduate school. The Ministry of Education, Culture, Sports, Science and Technology selected ICU as one of the 37 schools for The Top Global University Project in 2014.

ICU is known for being a fully bilingual campus, the classes are held in either English or Japanese, with all faculty required to have strong command in both languages. ICU is a member of the Alliance of Asian Liberal Arts Universities.

== Institution ==
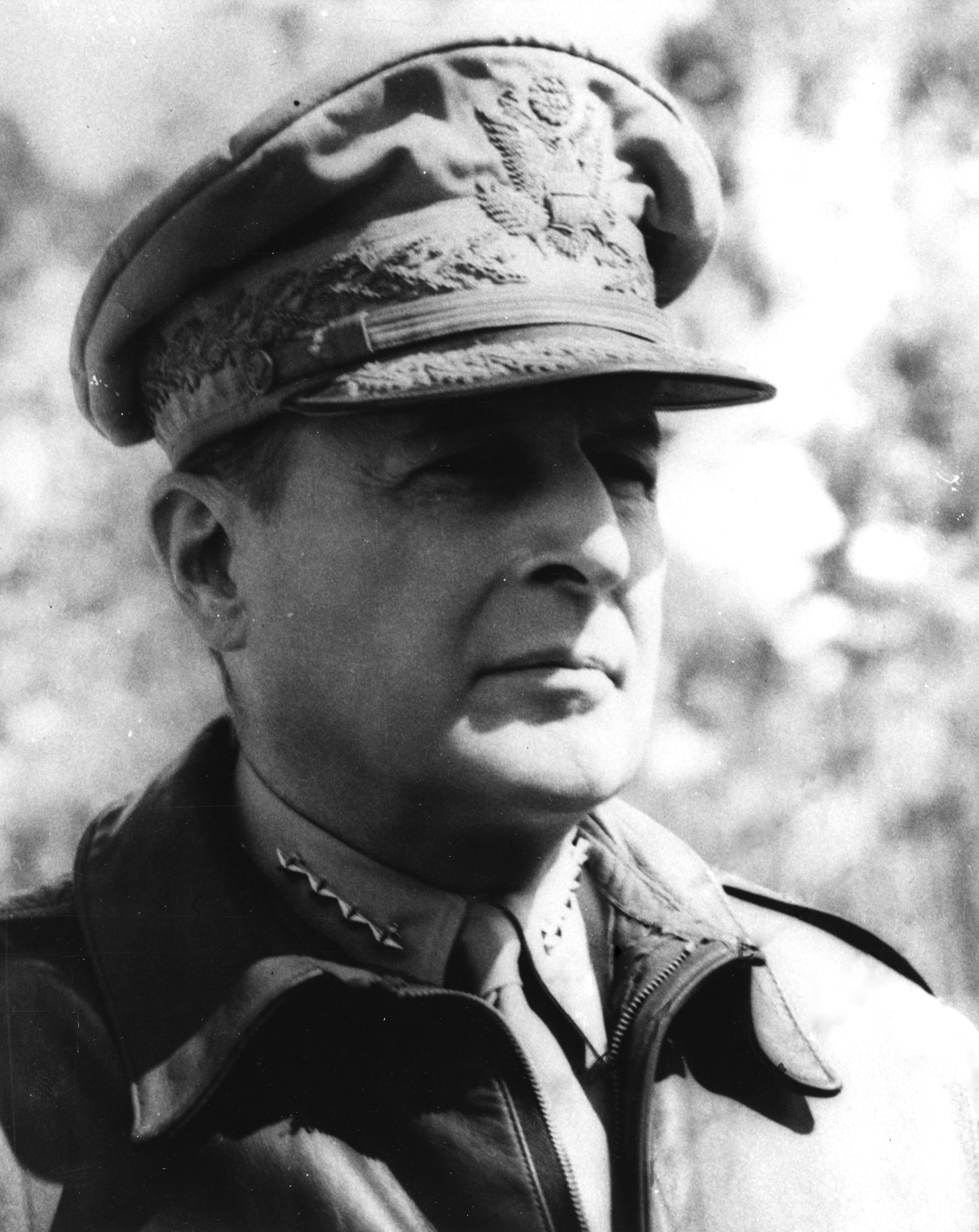
General Douglas MacArthur, Honorary Chair of the US fundraising campaign

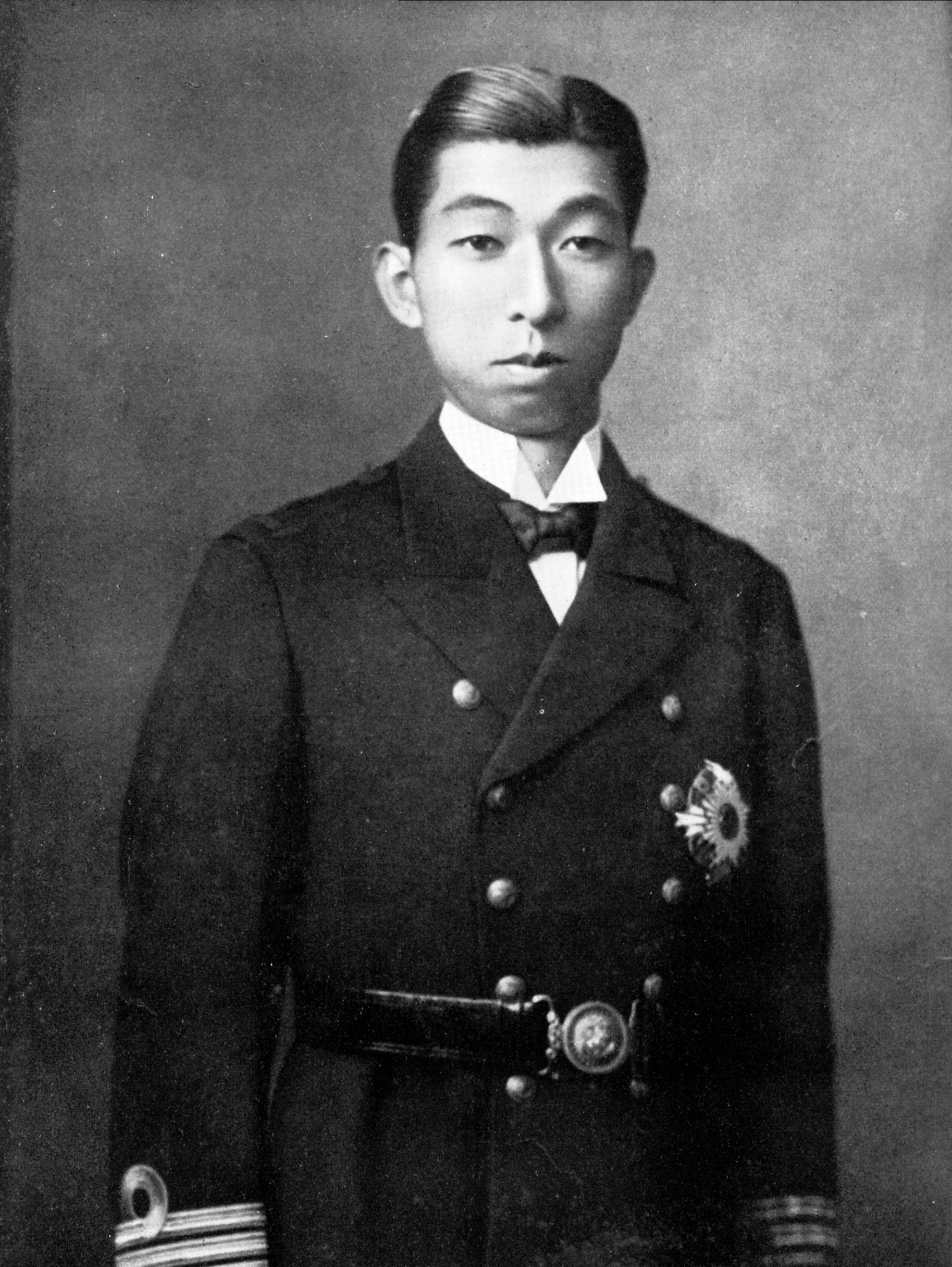
Nobuhito, Prince Takamatsu, Honorary President of the Preparatory Committee for founding ICU

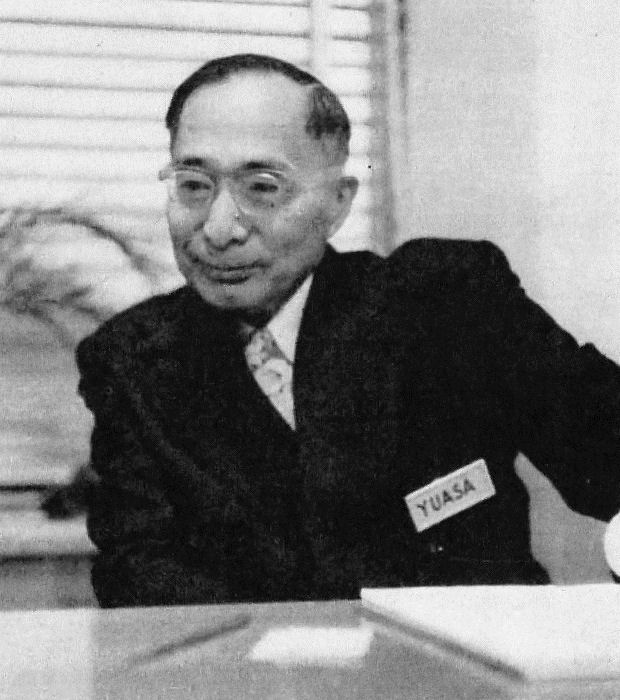
Hachiro Yuasa (ja), first President of ICU

=== History ===
ICU was founded in 1949. With an emphasis on reconciliation and peace, ICU was envisaged as a "University of Tomorrow", a place where Japanese and international students would live together and learn to serve the needs of an emerging, more interconnected world. When students enter ICU they sign the United Nations Universal Declaration of Human Rights and they are challenged to commit themselves to help bring about social justice and world peace. Due to this commitment to human rights, Eleanor Roosevelt delivered ICU's first convocation address.

According to JICUF (Japan ICU Foundation),

Concerted fundraising campaigns were initiated in both Japan and in North America. Hisato Ichimada, the Governor of the Bank of Japan who was Buddhist, headed the Japan campaign that raised the funds necessary to purchase a large tract of land for the university. The Honorary Chair of the US fundraising campaign was General Douglas MacArthur, and the North American public responded with generous contributions as well.

Nobuhito, Prince Takamatsu officiated the Honorary President of the Preparatory Committee for founding ICU.

== Campus ==
ICU's 150-acre main campus is located in Western Tokyo, with downtown areas like Shinjuku about half an hour's train ride away.

The campus sits on pre-Jomon and Jomon archaeological remains. Excavated items found on the campus are on permanent display in the Hachiro Yuasa Memorial Museum. In addition, the campus is directly on the former location of a Nakajima Aircraft Company factory.

The Taizanso Garden, built in the 1920s, includes a traditional Japanese tea house and the One-Mat Room constructed out of wood.

ICU owns a 240-acre (0.97 km^{2}) campus in Nasu and a 13-acre (53,000 m^{2}) retreat center in Karuizawa, Kitasaku District, Nagano Prefecture.

ICU houses a Rotary Center for peace and conflict resolution, partnering with Rotary International. It is the only Rotary Peace Center giving graduate degrees in Asia and is only one of seven Peace Centers worldwide. The University of California Tokyo Study Center which hosts the UCEAP program to Japan is also located on ICU campus.

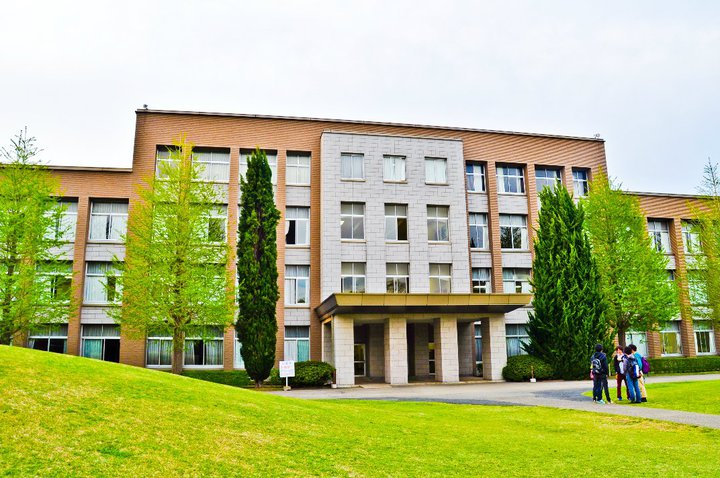
The exterior of the main building including the classrooms, laboratories and clinics was changed in 2003.

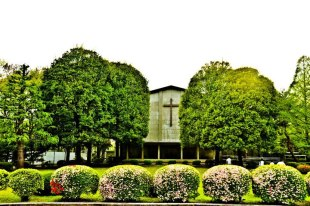
The entrance ceremonies and the graduation ceremonies are held in the ICU Chapel.

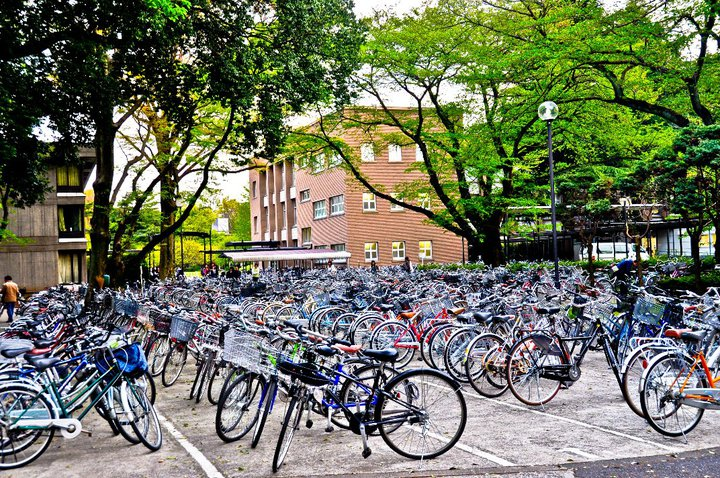
There are students who ride bicycles on the wide ICU campus.

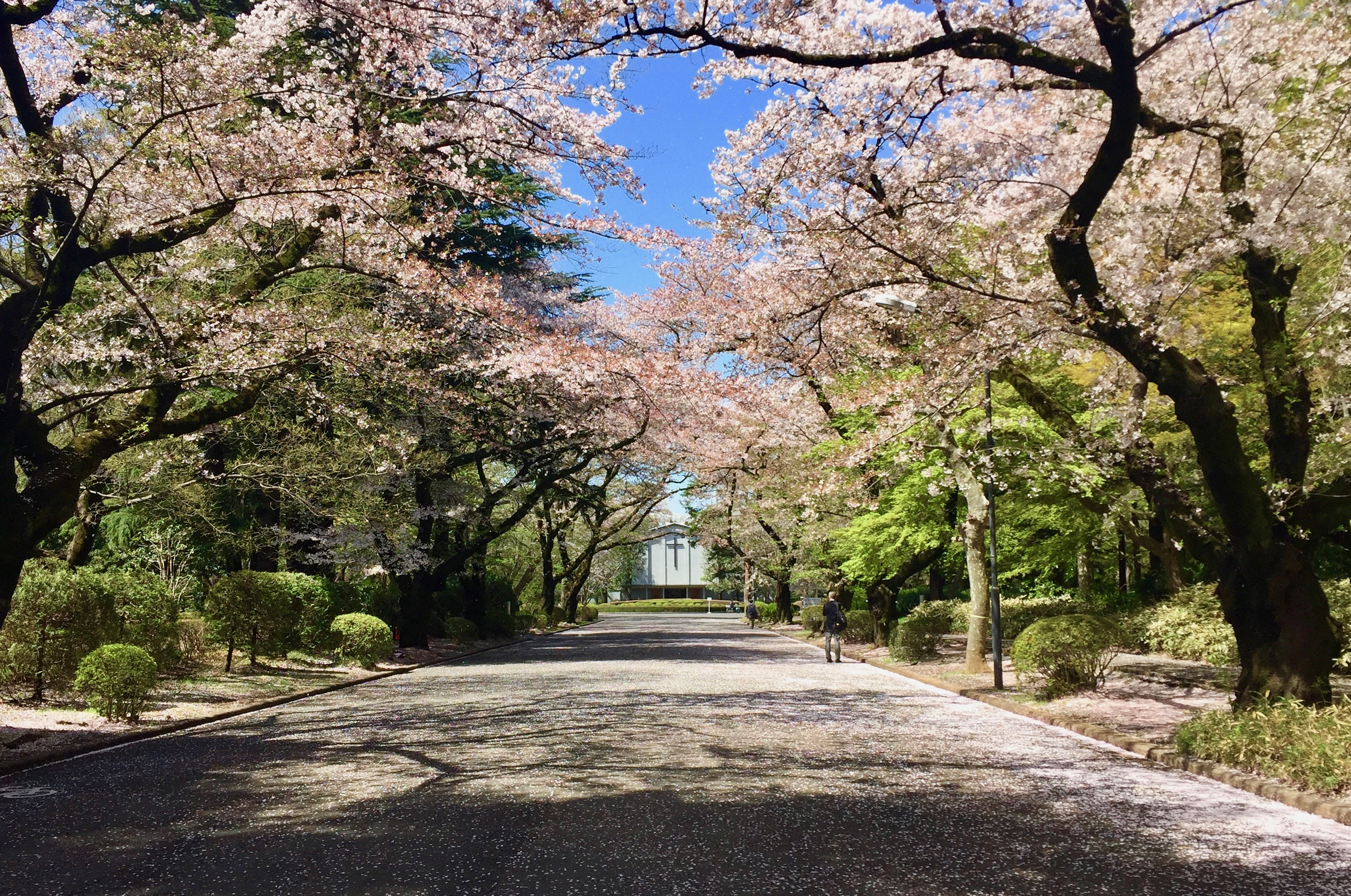
The entrance to ICU leading up to the university chapel. The road has rows of cherry blossom trees on both side which bloom in spring, signifying the start of a new school year.

== Academics ==
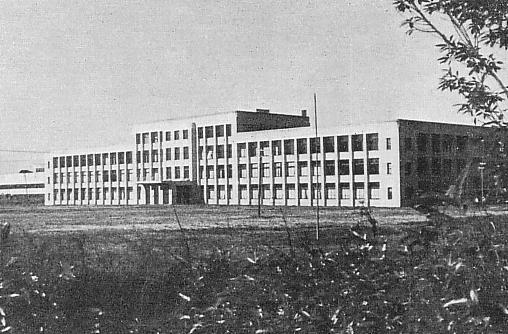
International Christian University in 1950s. The main building was used by Mitaka Institute of the Nakajima Aircraft Company.

ICU offers bachelor's degrees in liberal arts fields, as well as master's and doctoral degrees in education, public administration, comparative culture and the natural sciences. About 18% of the faculty come from overseas (primarily English-speaking countries). There is a strong English language program (ELP), taught by tenured and contract faculty English teachers, which was embroiled in a contentious curricular reform in 2010 leading to the name being changed to the ELA (English for Liberal Arts program) in April 2012. Academics who aspire to teach at ICU are required to submit a reference who can testify to their commitment to Christianity, despite the university's stance that increasing adherents to the Christian faith is not its primary goal.

=== Undergraduate programs ===
Students choose one or two majors as single major, double major or major/minor. Over 30 majors are being offered as of 2022.

- American Studies
- Anthropology
- Arts and Archaeology
- Asian Studies
- Biology
- Business
- Chemistry
- Computer Science
- Development Studies
- Economics
- Education
- Environmental Studies
- Gender and Sexuality Studies
- Global Studies
- International Relations
- Japan Studies
- Language Education
- Law
- Linguistics
- Literature
- Mathematics
- Media, Communication and Culture
- Music
- Peace Studies
- Philosophy and Religion
- Physics
- Politics
- Psychology
- Public Policy
- Sociology

=== Graduate programs ===
Graduate programs at the university include:

- Master of Arts in Education
  - Concentrations: Education, Psychology, or Language Education
- Master of Arts in Public Administration or Master of Arts in International Relations
- Master of Arts in Social and Cultural Analysis
- Master of Arts in Media and Language
- Master of Arts in Public Economics
- Master of Arts in Peace Studies
- Master of Arts in Comparative Culture
  - Concentrations: Japanese Culture Studies or Transcultural Studies
- Master of Arts in Natural Sciences
  - Concentrations: Mathematics and Information Science, Material Science, or Life Science

=== Bilingual academics ===
The languages of instruction at ICU are Japanese and English. Around 30% of all courses are offered in English, the rest in Japanese or in both languages.

Prospective students without prior Japanese language knowledge are able to apply under a documentary screening process, instead of undergoing the entrance exams held in Japanese. These students are required to have college level English proficiency and subsequently take ICU Japanese Language Programs (JLP) courses to gain bilingualism and eventually take courses taught in Japanese.

Under the policy of bilingualism of ICU curriculum, students take language courses for their non-dominant language in their freshman and sophomore year (Depending on the student's language requirements, English for Liberal Arts or Japanese Language Programs).

Each campus department staffs employees with strong command in both languages. Student resources, ICU websites, and campus bulletin boards are in both Japanese and English to accommodate students from any language background.

=== Trimester system ===
The academic year is divided into trimesters of approximately eleven weeks each with each course lasting one trimester term. This allows for a dynamic learning experience, one where students can design their own curricula as their interests change and develop.

=== Japan ICU Foundation ===
The Japan ICU Foundation (JICUF) was incorporated in New York State on November 23, 1948, and helped to establish ICU in 1953. Today, the foundation maintains two non-profit corporations: The Japan ICU Foundation, Inc. and the JICUF Endowment, Inc.

The Japan ICU Foundation supports ICU in a variety of ways, including providing scholarships, running a faculty exchange program, providing funding for international programs and projects and helping to fund new buildings on campus. The Foundation has offices in New York City. The current Executive Director of JICUF is Paul Hastings.

== Research institutes ==
ICU has eight research institutes as of 2016. In addition to research, these institutes plan and sponsor conferences, lectures, symposia and seminars as well as provide students with opportunities to meet distinguished scholars from Japan and overseas.

- The Institute of Educational Research and Service (IERS)
- The Social Science Research Institute (SSRI)
- The Institute for the Study of Christianity and Culture (ICC)
- The Institute of Asian Cultural Studies (IACS)
- The Peace Research Institute (PRI)
- The Research Center for Japanese Language Education (RCJLE)
- The Institute for Advanced Studies of Clinical Psychology (IASCP)
- The Center for Gender Studies (CGS)

== Student life ==
=== Demographics ===
As of 2011, ICU had 2851 undergraduates studying in the College of Liberal Arts, with 1041 male students and 1810 female students. The ICU Graduate School had 150 students, with 64 men and 86 women. 90.5% of ICU's undergraduate and graduate students are Japanese citizens, and the remainder represent 44 countries. Many returnee Japanese students who have lived overseas, also known as kikokushijo (帰国子女), make up the student body.

The majority of ICU students live off-campus, either at home with their families or in apartments. As of 2010, about 600 students were living on campus.

=== International Education Exchange Programs ===
More than half of the students participate in study abroad programs during their time at ICU. The percentage of students who study abroad through ICU programs before they graduate is 55.5% (in 2014). Students who come from abroad to study at ICU on a year-long exchange program are referred to as OYRs (One Year Regulars).

=== ICU Dining Hall ===
The ICU Dining Hall, also known as Gakki (ガッキ), is the official cafeteria of International Christian University. Rebuilt in 2010, Gakki is a public, self-service cafeteria and is one of the newest buildings on campus.

=== Student clubs/circles ===
There are around 100 student-led clubs and organizations in the arts, sports, academic and social fields. Most ICU students participate in one or more clubs.

=== After graduation ===
As of 2016, 95.3% of ICU undergraduate alumni (students seeking employment) get employment after graduation. ICU students will often be employed in a wide range of industries, particularly with global companies.

Over 20% of students go on to graduate school overseas and in Japan. Domestic and Overseas Universities include: International Christian University, University of Tokyo, Kyoto University, Hitotsubashi University, University of Oxford, Columbia University, Massachusetts Institute of Technology, University of London, and Harvard University.

== Accreditation ==
Accreditation actions had been taken at the American Academy for Liberal Education Board of Trustees Meeting at November 2005.

- International Christian University, Tokyo, Japan – granted Programmatic Accreditation, through November 2015

ICU's academic programs of the College of Liberal Arts and the Graduate School are individually chartered by the Japanese Ministry of Education, Culture, Sports, Science and Technology (MEXT). ICU has also received accreditation from the Japan University Accreditation Association (JUAA).

== Academic rankings ==
University rankings
Global
QS	General	1001–1200

Regional
QS Asia (Asia version)	General	291–300

National

There are several rankings related to ICU, shown below.

=== General rankings ===
In 2025, ICU's teaching was ranked 1st among private universities, and 11th nationally by Times Higher Education and Benesse. QS World University Rankings ranked ICU as 174th in Asia in 2016. Forbes made a list of top 10 liberal arts colleges in Asia including ICU that was based on the 2014 QS University rankings for Asia.

=== Popularity and selectivity ===
ICU is a selective university.

== Notable alumni ==
See also List in Japanese version

Notable Alumni of ICU

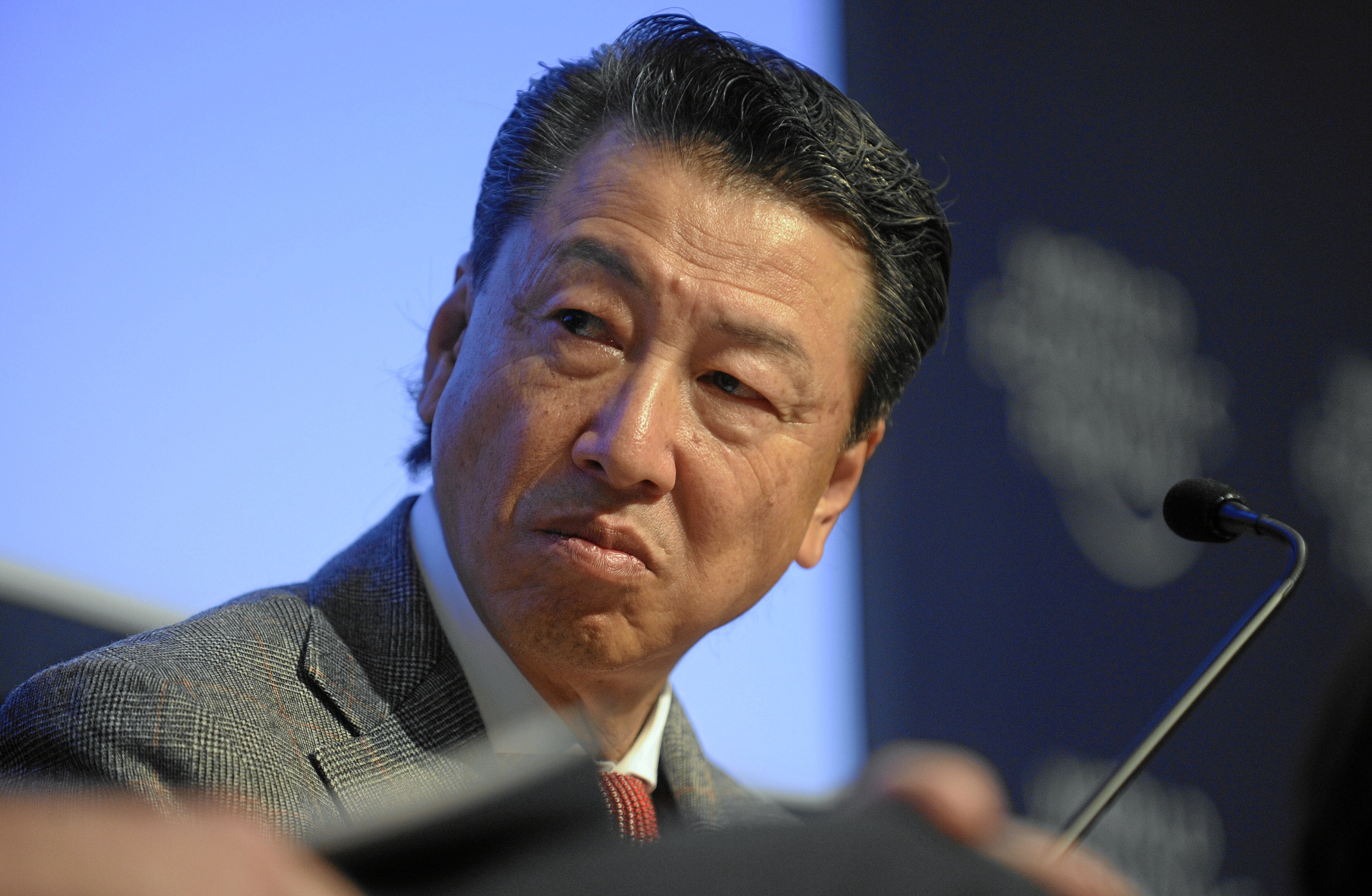
Hirotaka Takeuchi, Professor of Harvard Business School

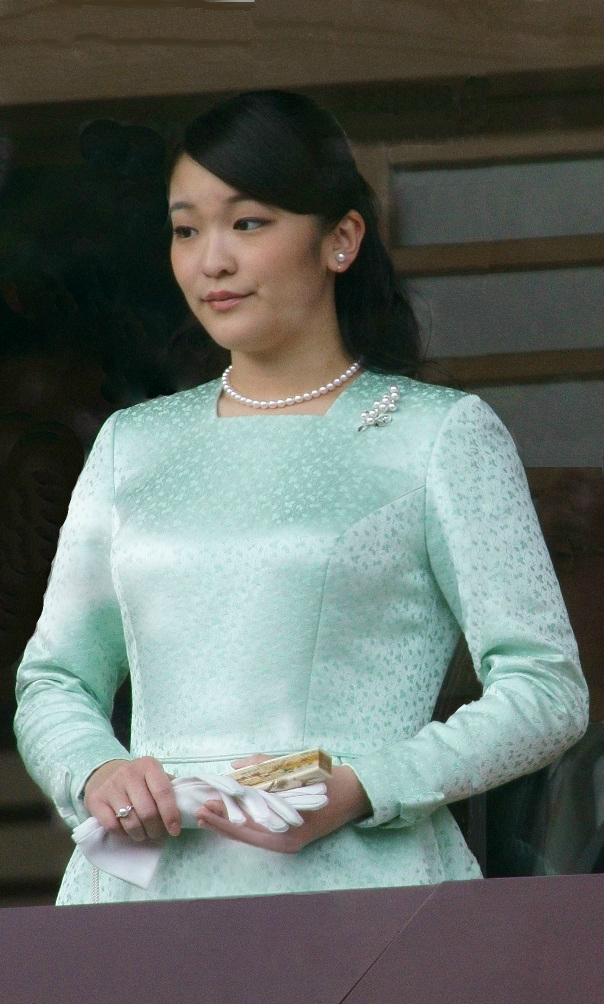
Princess Mako of Akishino

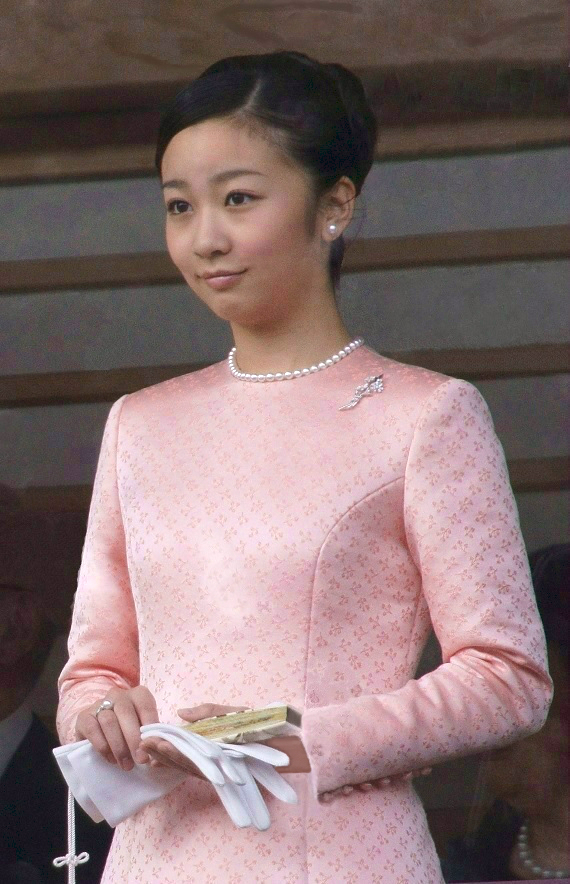
Princess Kako of Akishino

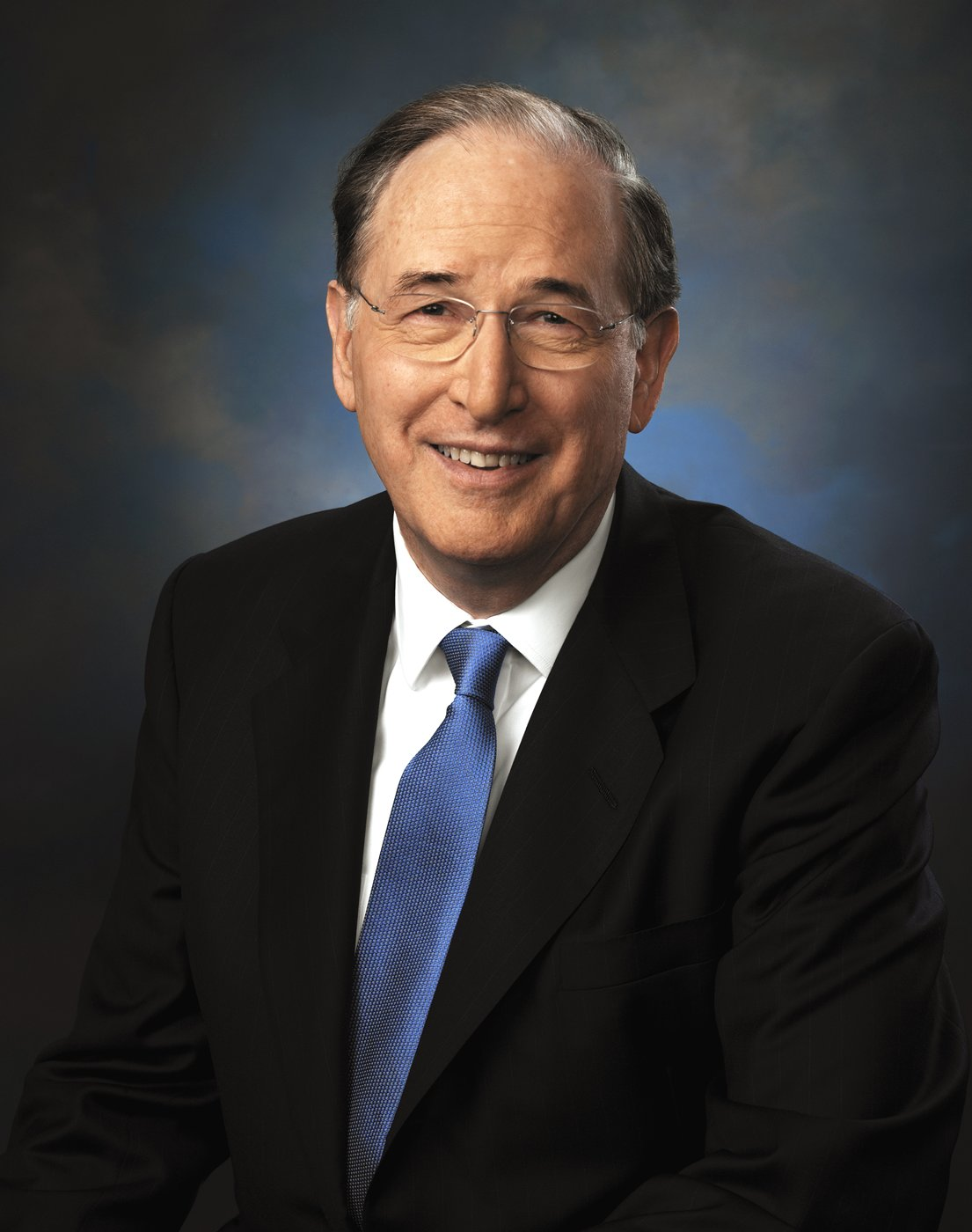
Jay Rockefeller, a United States Senator from West Virginia

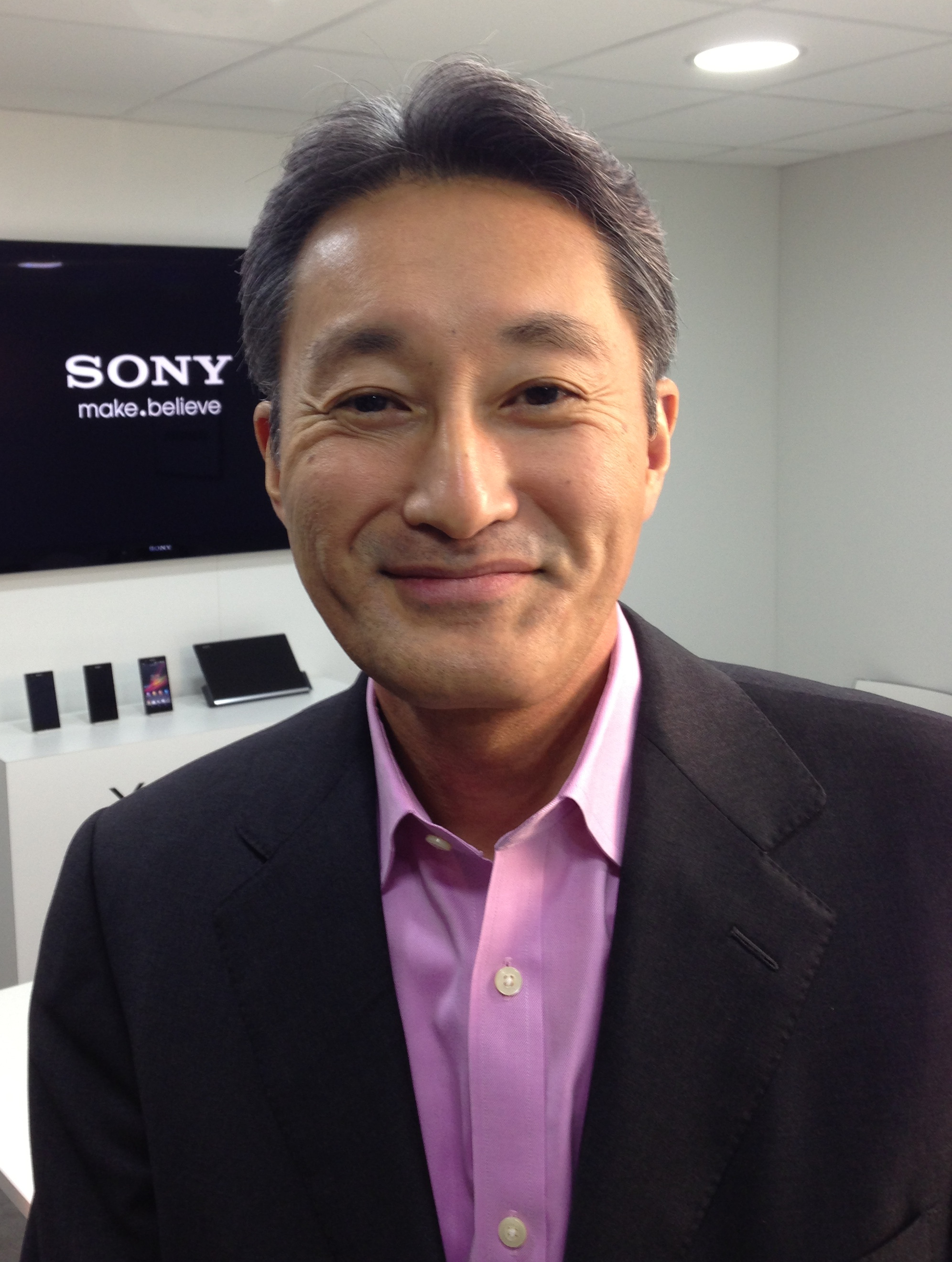
Kaz Hirai, Chairman of Sony Corporation

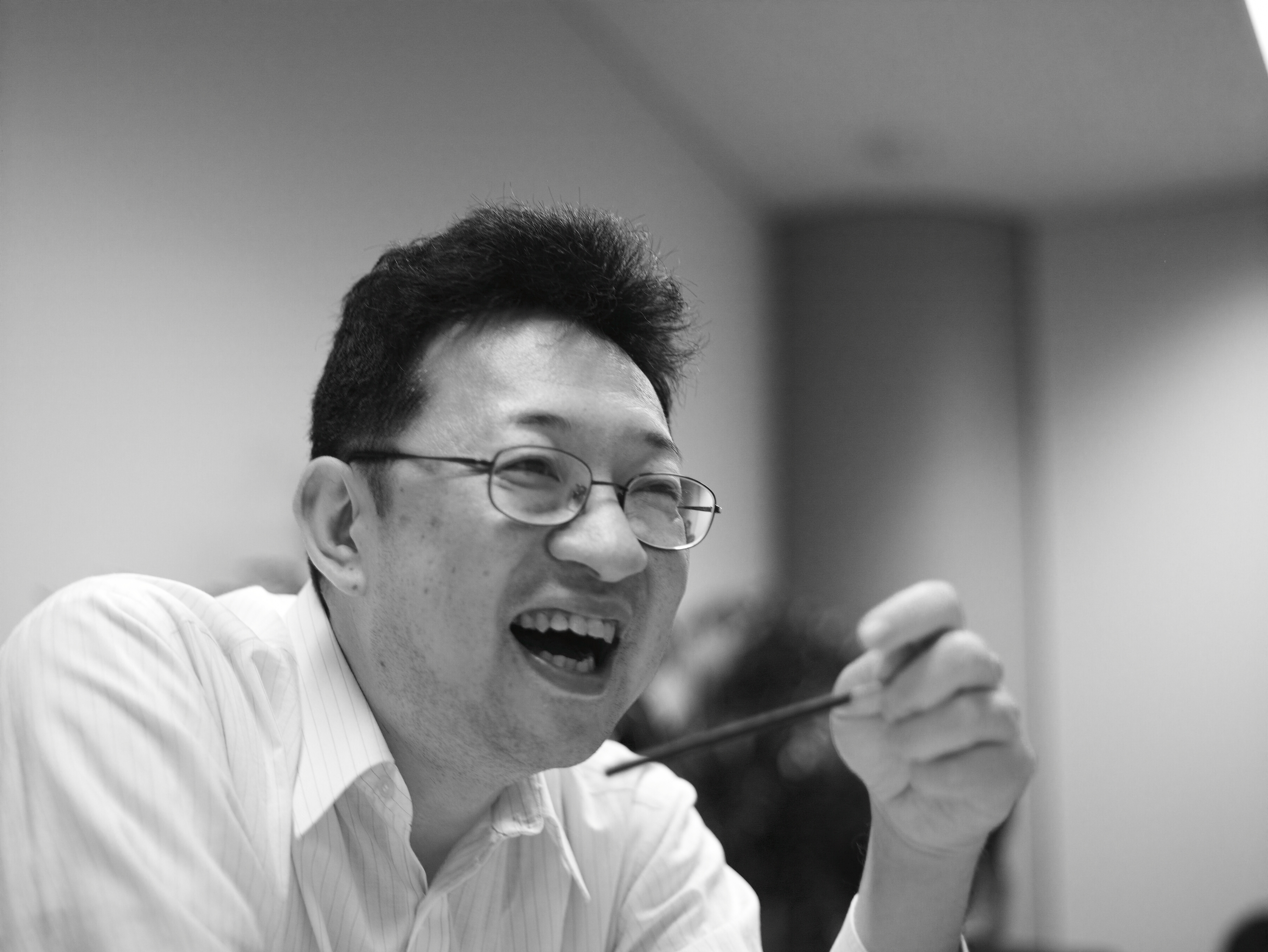
Hiroaki Kitano, President and CEO of Sony Computer Science Laboratories, Professor of Okinawa Institute of Science and Technology

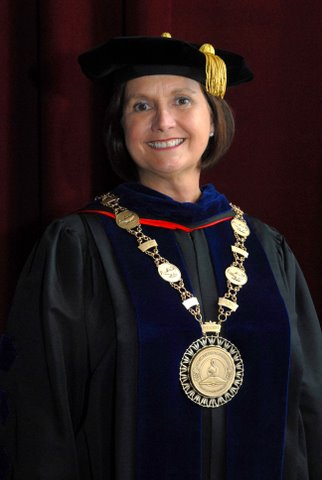
Betsy Boze (née: Vogel), CEO and dean of Kent State University Stark

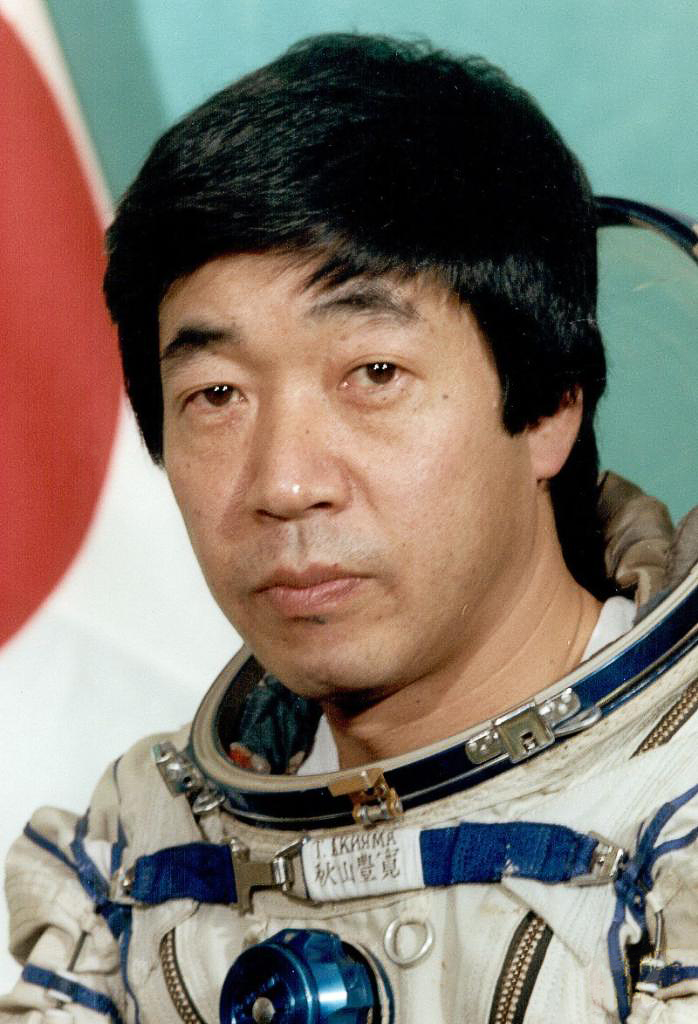
Toyohiro Akiyama, the first journalist and the first Japanese person in space on the first commercially organized spaceflight
- Kei Akagi – jazz pianist
- Takeshi Amemiya – The Edward Ames Edmonds Professor of Economics at Stanford University
- Toshio Arima – president of Fuji Xerox
- Shigehiro Oishi - Marshall Fields IV Professor of Psychology at University of Chicago
- Albert Chan (1975) – president of Hong Kong Baptist University
- Cosei Kawa – illustrator of children's books
- Shigeru Miyagawa – professor of Linguistics & Kochi-Manjiro professor of Japanese Language and Culture at Massachusetts Institute of Technology
- Yoko Narahashi – prominent film producer and casting director
- Mariko Peters – former Dutch politician and civil servant
- Kazuko Yokoo – justice of the Supreme Court of Japan
- Lydia Yu-Jose – Japanologist and professor at the Ateneo de Manila University
- Nozomi Watanabe – Olympic ice dancer who regularly dances with Akiyuki Kido
- Kaori Enjoji – business journalist
- Kei Komuro – law clerk at Lowenstein Sandler, husband of former Japanese princess Mako Komuro
- Charles Honoris – Indonesian politician and member of House of Representatives

== Faculty ==
- Iwao Ayusawa, joined staff in 1952
- Michiko Chiura, archaeologist, d.1982

== See also ==
- International Christian University High School
