= Paul McGowan =

Paul McGowan is the name of:

- Paul McGowan (footballer) (born 1987), Scottish footballer
- Paul McGowan (artist) (born 1967), artist and fashion designer
- Paul McGowan (American football) (born 1966), former American football linebacker
- Paul D. McGowan (1947–2014), American politician
