= Falmouth University =

Art university in Cornwall, England

Coordinates: 50°10′15″N 05°07′31″W

- Pennskol Aberfala
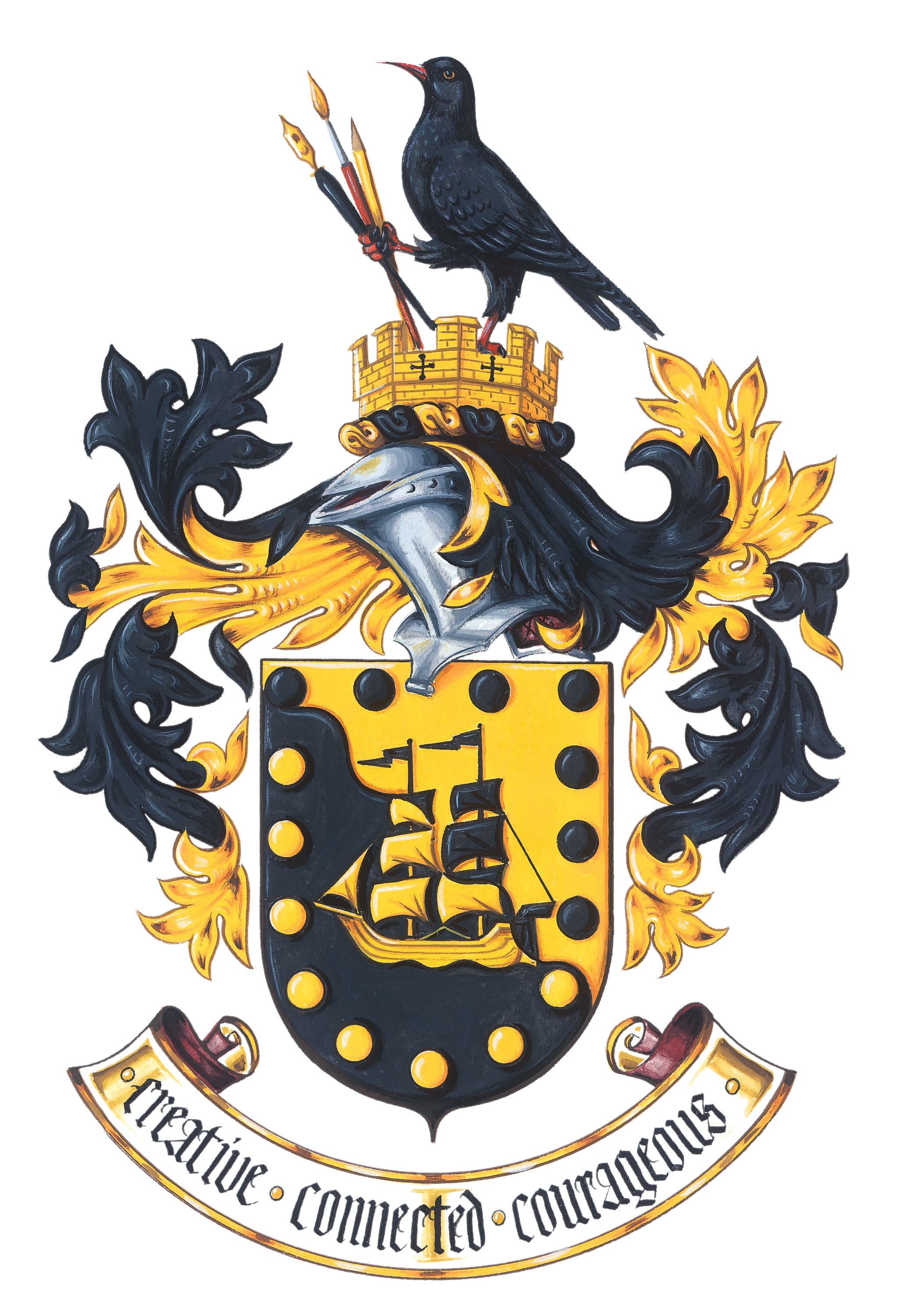
- Coat of arms
- Motto: Creative, Connected, Courageous
- Type: Public university
- Established: 2012 – gained University Status; 2005 – University College Falmouth; 1995 – Falmouth College of Arts; 1987 – Falmouth College of Art and Design; 1902 – Established as Falmouth School of Arts
- Affiliations: Combined Universities in Cornwall; Universities UK; University of Exeter
- Chancellor: Dawn French
- Vice-Chancellor: Emma Hunt
- Students: 8,185 (2024/25)
- Undergraduates: (2024/25)
- Postgraduates: 1,195 (2024/25)
- Location: Penryn and Falmouth, Cornwall, England
- Campus: Woodlane, Falmouth – 6 acres Penryn Campus, Penryn – 70 acres
- Colours: White and Cornish Gold
- Website: falmouth.ac.uk
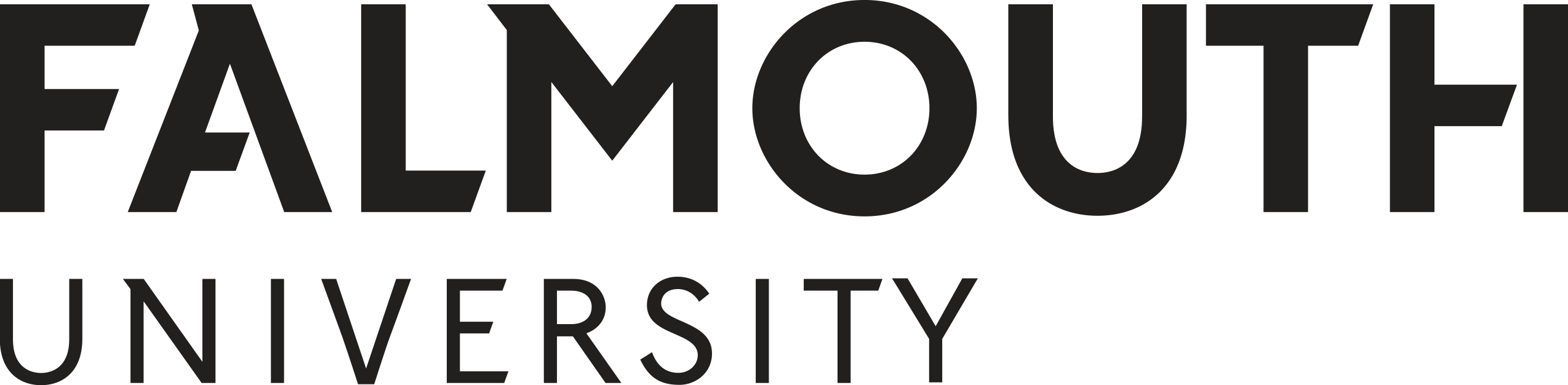

Falmouth University (Cornish: Pennskol Aberfala) is a specialist public university for the creative industries based in Falmouth and Penryn in Cornwall, UK. Founded as Falmouth School of Art in 1902, it was later known as Falmouth College of Art and Design and then Falmouth College of Arts until 2012, when the university college was officially granted full university status by the Privy Council.

The university is located across two campuses, in the towns of Penryn and Falmouth. Penryn Campus, near the town of Penryn, is the larger of its two campuses, which it operates in partnership with the University of Exeter. The Falmouth Campus is in Falmouth town centre. Falmouth University has about 7,000 students as of 2023, offering undergraduate and postgraduate degrees.

== History ==
View of the RCPS building designed by George Wightwick

Falmouth University was founded as the Falmouth School of Art in 1902, in response to the decline of scientific activities in Cornwall due to the diminishing Cornish mining industry.

=== Falmouth School of Art ===
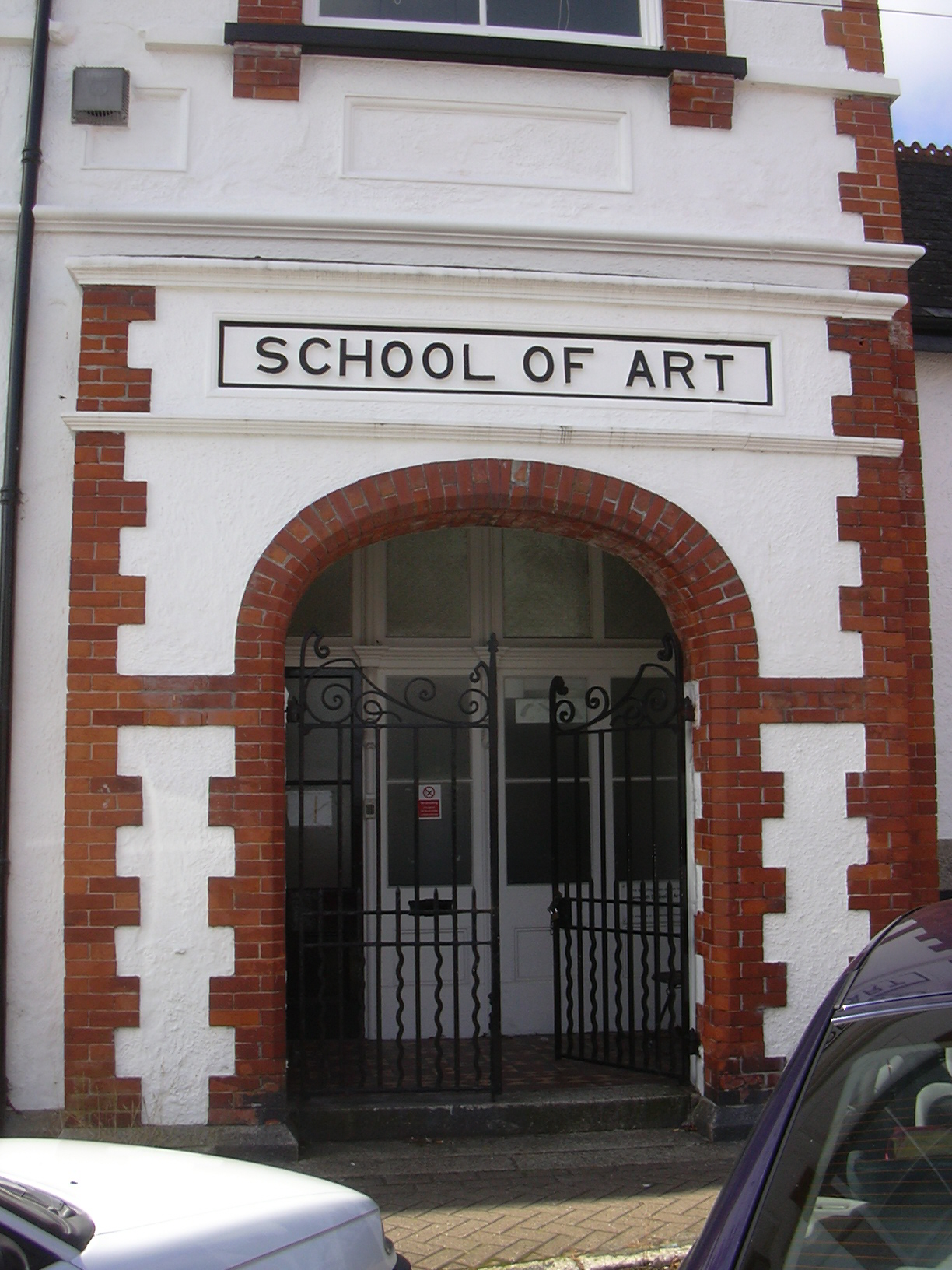
Entrance to the original Falmouth School of Art building in Arwenack Avenue erected in 1901 to the designs of the architect Oliver Caldwell

In 1902, Falmouth School of Art was a wholly private venture and offered classes such as Freehand Drawing, Model Drawing, Painting from Still Life, Drawing from the Antique, Drawing in Light & Shade, and Memory Drawing of Plant Form. Students were charged between four and ten shillings per session for the privilege, and were offered the opportunity to enter for Board of Education exams.

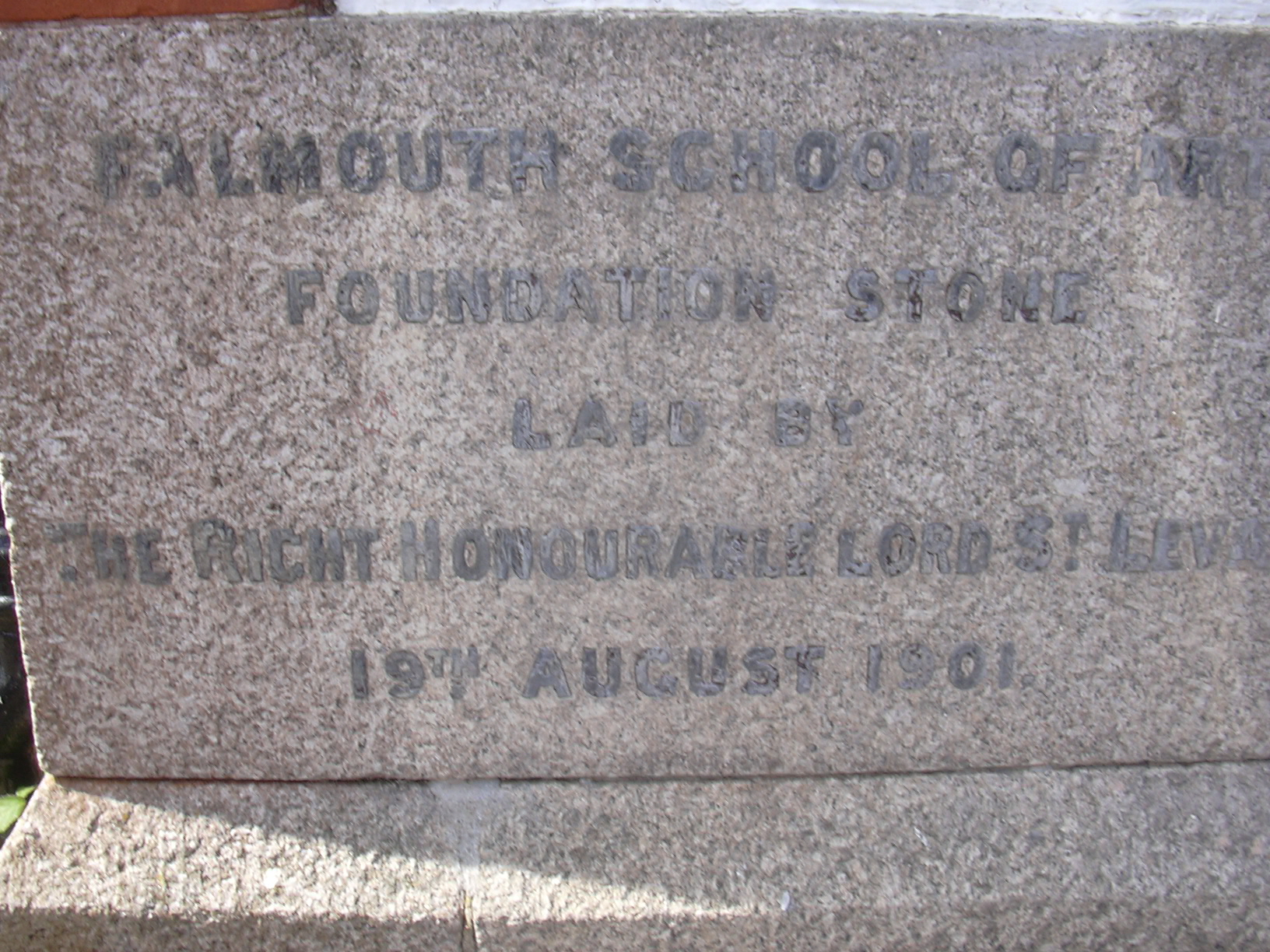
FU Arwenack Avenue Annexe

In 1938, the Local Education Authority (LEA) took over the administration of the institution.

In the 1940s, courses became the responsibility of the head of Truro School of Art, Stanley Wright, was appointed principal, the school was recognised by the Ministry of Education and began to plan ambitious expansion. At this time there were six full-time members of teaching staff responsible for 21 full-time students, 55 part-time day students and 104 part-time evening students. Students were offered the option of studying either "art" or "craft". Art, by definition, covered fine art, drawing and painting, museum study, and modelling and casting in clay. "Craft" included leather, weaving, bookbinding, block printing and wood inlay.

In the 1950s, the college relocated from Arwenack Avenue to Kerris Vean in Woodlane (built in 1875), Jack Bridger Chalker was appointed principal and courses for the Ministry of Education's Intermediate and National Diploma in Design Examinations were offered for the first time. Studios for sculpture and printed textiles were constructed in the grounds. The school now occupied a unique site in the former Fox-Rosehill sub-tropical gardens (which rivalled many others of great renown, such as Glendurgan and Trebah), Michael Finn was appointed principal, the school began a commercial design course for vocational students as well as a junior design course for school children, and the National Advisory Council for Art Education (NACAE) was established.

In the 1960s, the NACAE published its first report, Peter Lanyon and Terry Frost were appointed as visiting lecturers, a further storey was added to the textiles and sculpture workshops for use as a printmaking studio, and alterations to Kerris Vean presented opportunities for the study of photography. The question for Falmouth at this time was whether an art school with only 120 students, situated in a remote and economically disadvantaged part of the country, could compete for recognition with much larger institutions, against a national backdrop of changing approaches to art education. The LEA and leading artists such as Dame Barbara Hepworth, Bryan Wynter and Patrick Heron were both generous with, and energetic in, their support of the School.

The next dilemma for the School was whether it should seek the NACAE's authorisation to offer the new Diploma in Art & Design (equivalent to a degree), and at that point, it decided to focus on full-time Intermediate and National Diploma students, and relinquish both its commercial design course and some part-time classes. With the purchase of Woodlane's Rosehill House (built by Robert Were Fox in 1820) in the offing, it had seemed certain that the School would successfully achieve the recognition that it so earnestly sought, but having underestimated the NACAE's basic requirements for general accommodation, studio space and staffing, and having failed to convince the Council that such a small institution could survive, it was with regret that the school received the news that the NACAE had refused its application. Undaunted, the search for additional land commenced.

Encouragement came to try again from Dame Barbara Hepworth, Bernard Leach, Patrick Heron and Bryan Wynter in 1964. In 1965, the momentous day arrived when the NACAE overturned its earlier verdict, following a reassessment of the school by the chairman and vice chancellor of the NACAE, and the principal of the Royal College of Art (RCA). The school was now recognised as a centre for the Diploma in Art & Design, with painting as a main course. Recognition for sculpture was to follow shortly. There were now 40 full-time students at the school, with a remit to expand to at least 100 students, but such expansion could only come about with a major building programme and the purchase of yet more land.

In the mid-1960s, additional studios and technical workshops were added to the school's estate, and the LEA acquired Rosehill House on its behalf. Of great architectural merit, this building became the centre for Complementary Studies with History of Art, and the library. Additional land was then purchased at the southernmost boundary of the Woodlane site to enable the enlargement of the painting studios and to provide a cinema, canteen, common room and games room.

At this time, the school offered a pre-diploma (the precursor of the modern-day Foundation programme), a Diploma in Art & Design (DipAD) which superseded the National Design Diploma (NDD), and entrance examinations for postgraduate art and design institutions such as the RCA and the Slade. Design became an important aspect of the school's curricula, with Patrick Heron teaching two-dimensional design, and Dame Barbara Hepworth and Bernard Leach teaching three-dimensional design. Photography appeared in the college's academic portfolio for the first time in 1963. The number of teaching staff at the school had risen from six in the 1940s to 25 in the 1960s.

In the 1970s, the school acquired an hotel opposite the Woodlane site and converted it into an hostel for 21 students, John Barnicoat was appointed principal, and the school was recognised by the Council for National Academic Awards (CNAA) as a centre for a three-year programme of study leading to the award of a BA (Hons) degree in fine art. In 1976, Tom Cross was appointed principal and the school continued to develop its resources by improving its sculpture studios and creating a new studio for ceramic sculpture. A purpose-built facility for photography and film was added, the library was enlarged, and the acquisition of a further student hostel in Woodlane, at Lamorva House, enabled the school to offer accommodation to 57 students. In addition, the original Arwenack Art School was handed back to the school to serve its introductory Foundation course as a centre for three-dimensional studies.

In the 1980s, BA (Hons) Fine Art was the principal academic course. A two-year BTEC General Art & Design course was added to the school's portfolio and additional facilities for printmaking, photography, textiles and fashion were then created in buildings adjacent to the school in Woodlane. At this point, the school had a population of approximately 200 students on both HE and FE courses.

=== Reorganisation of art education in Cornwall ===
By 1984, the school was under threat of closure from the National Advisory Board (NAB) on the grounds that its fine art degree course "was academically and geographically isolated". The National Advisory Body was set up to 'rationalise' fine art provision in Britain in line with prime minister Margaret Thatcher's belief that art education should return to its 19th-century role of providing designers for industry.

The chairman and vice chairman of the school's board of governors, the acting principal, Ian Carrick, the acting deputy for the principal, Charles Hancock, and Patrick Heron, quickly implemented the school's only available strategy for survival and galvanized the support of local MPs, renowned artists, several former students including Andrew James Campbell and David Olivant (1980) and friends of the school. The response received was significant and a large number of individuals wrote to the NAB in support of the school from both within and outside the county.

Research conducted by NAB itself found that graduates from fine art courses headed the league tables for gaining employment in arts related fields after finishing their degrees. The NAB subsequently withdrew its threat of closure and agreed that it would turn its attention to reviewing Cornwall's art and design provision in its entirety instead.

Historically there had been no overall LEA policy for art and design education in Cornwall beyond an accepted notion that fine art should be taught at Falmouth School of Art and "applied" art at Cornwall College, and it had been observed on several occasions that this anomaly presented the greatest impediment to the development of a real centre of excellence for art and design education in Cornwall. As a result, a joint working party involving senior specialist staff from both institutions was formed by the LEA to consider the future development of art and design in the county.

In 1978, Cornwall College, a predominantly FE orientated institution, had formed a faculty of art and design. It offered full-time, three and four-year vocational courses in graphic design, technical illustration, display and exhibition design, and ceramics to about 150 students, leading to the award of South West Region Diplomas in Design and Licentiateship to the Chartered Society of Designers. In the early 1980s, these courses were converted to BTEC National Diploma (ND) and Higher National Diploma (HND) courses. A one-year foundation design course was also in operation and in 1982, the CNAA validated the faculty's Postgraduate Diploma in Radio Journalism.

By 1986, the student population of this faculty had risen to around 500 full-time equivalents (FTEs). The faculty had significantly outgrown its resources at Cornwall College's main campus and there were no residential facilities for the increasing number of students that it recruited nationally.

In 1987, it was agreed by Cornwall County Council, and endorsed by the Secretary of State for Education, that Falmouth School of Art and Cornwall College's Faculty of Art & Design would merge to become Falmouth School of Art & Design. This new institution would be located at the Woodlane Campus in Falmouth.

The portfolio of courses to be offered by the new institution to the combined population of 636 full-time students included: BA (Hons) Fine Art, BA (Hons) Scientific & Technical Graphics, PgDip Radio Journalism, BTEC ND and HND Graphic Design, BTEC ND and HND Technical Illustration, BTEC HND Ceramics, BTEC ND Design, BTEC ND General Art & Design and a foundation course.

In the same year, the first phase of new building work to provide accommodation for BA (Hons) Scientific & Technical Graphics commenced at Woodlane, the newly formed board of governors for Falmouth School of Art & Design appointed Alan Livingston as principal, and a structure comprising eight study areas led by principal lecturers was agreed.

As a result of the Education Reform Act 1988, the School became an independent Higher Education Corporation in April 1989.

=== Falmouth College of Arts ===
The 1990s witnessed the rapid development of the college's academic portfolio. Falmouth School of Art & Design became Falmouth College of Arts to signify its recognition of media as an arts subject. From 1992, the college's awards were accredited by the University of Plymouth. By 1996, the student population included 906 full-time and 60 part-time undergraduates, 38 full-time and 68 part-time postgraduates, and 290 FE students.

In 1998–99, the college was the only HE institution in the UK to be awarded 24 out of 24 for its teaching of art and design at undergraduate and postgraduate level by the Quality Assurance Agency (QAA). The college also acquired its second campus at Tremough, an 18th-century, grade II listed country house and 70-acre (28 ha) estate in the nearby town of Penryn.

=== University College Falmouth ===
As of 1 March 2005, Falmouth College of Arts became University College Falmouth, the only independent higher education institution based in Cornwall able to offer degrees in its own name. The University College's new Design Centre opened at Penryn Campus in the Autumn of 2003 as part of a £50 million development of the Campus under the Combined Universities in Cornwall initiative, including social facilities, additional teaching accommodation and a Learning Resource Centre.

Under the auspices of the CUC, the University of Exeter's operations in Cornwall transferred to Penryn in 2004, as this campus has been designated the "Hub" of the CUC (with Cornwall's FE Colleges forming the "Rim").

=== University College Falmouth incorporating Dartington College of Arts ===
In April 2008, Falmouth merged with Dartington College of Arts, adding a range of Performance courses to its portfolio. In October 2010, the University College opened its new Performance Centre, which combines teaching facilities with spaces for public performances.

Falmouth currently offers a Foundation Diploma in Art & Design. Undergraduate Courses at Falmouth include: BA(Hons) Advertising, Fine Art, Illustration, Marine & Natural History Photography, Photography, Press & Editorial Photography, Fashion Photography, Fashion Design, Graphic Design, Interior Design, Performance Sportswear Design, Textile Design, Sustainable Product Design, Digital Animation, Drawing, Digital Media, English, Creative Writing, English with Creative Writing, English with Media Studies, Film, Journalism, Dance, Music, Creative Music Technology, Popular Music, Theatre and Music Theatre.

Postgraduate Courses include: Business Administration, Creative Advertising, Creative Education, Film and Television, Illustration: Authorial Practice and Professional Writing.

Open Education: Falmouth launched the specialist Art, Design, Media & Performance open education repository, openSpace, in April 2010. Funded by a £20,000 grant from the Higher Education Academy, and project managed by JISC, the pilot project released 40 M-level credits from the MA Professional Writing course. The units, made available to the public through a Creative Commons licence, are free to use, access and study. A full Screenwriting Unit is freely available to study online. Other units include introductory units to: Novel Writing, Fiction Writing, Non-Fiction Writing, Writing for Children, Business Writing and Feature Writing.

=== Falmouth University ===
In November 2012, David Willetts, Minister of State for Universities and Science, recognised University College Falmouth's status as a full university following a rigorous appraisal process, and on 9 December 2012, the establishment was granted full university status.

In the years that followed, the university developed courses focusing on applied creativity and innovation, across disciplines including art, design and architecture, fashion, photography, performing arts, music, business and more recently gaming and computing.

In 2015, the university attracted more than €2.4 million in investment which helped launch a new Games Academy under the leadership of Tanya Krzywinska and the Meta-Makers Research Institute under the leadership of Simon Colton. These new centres of learning propose to enhance the growing digital economy in Cornwall, with an emphasis on delivering courses that marry creativity with technology such as BA Games Development, MA Creative App Development, and BSc Computing for Games.

In September 2023, the university - along with partners the University of Exeter, Cornwall Council, Council of the Isles of Scilly and the Cornwall and Isles of Scilly Integrated Care System - signed the Civic Universities Agreement, outlining their commitment to support the local communities and employers of the region.

In January 2024, the university received its largest ever research investment, with £7m awarded from Expanding Excellence in England (E3) Research England. The fund will support the development of the university's new Centre for Blended Realities, developing immersive and interactive environments.

As of 2024, the university is also working towards gaining Research Degree Awarding Powers, to accompany its Taught Degree Awarding Powers, so that it can award its own PhDs and MPhil awards.

== Campuses and buildings ==
=== Falmouth Campus ===
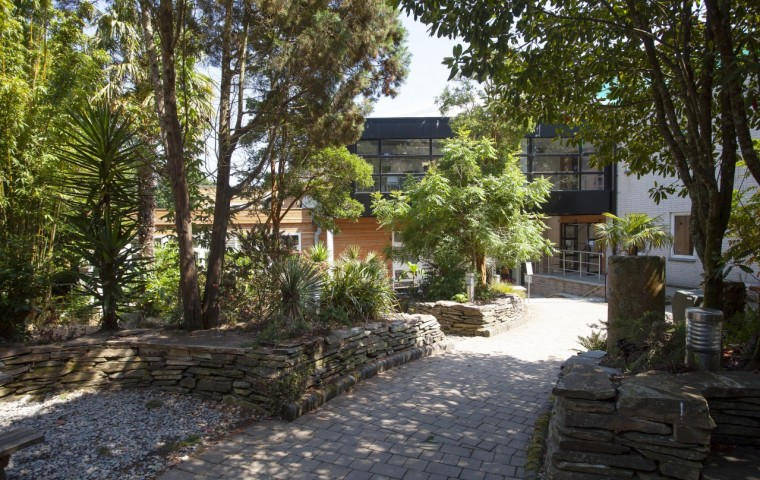
Fox Building, Falmouth Campus

Falmouth Campus is the university's original campus, based in the town of Falmouth. The site encompasses converted Victorian architecture, with additional purpose-built buildings in various architectural styles, added throughout the 20th and 21st centuries, as the university developed.

It is the home of the Falmouth School of Art, the School of Architecture, Design & Interiors and the School of Communications. The courses delivered on this campus include traditional art courses such as illustration, fine art and graphic design, as well as architecture, product design, interior design, creative writing and journalism/media courses.

Falmouth Campus also houses ancillary services and workshops - including print making, prosthetics studio, art studios and manufacturing studios - as well as a large cafe, library, art shop and a subtropical garden.

Surrounding the campus within the town of Falmouth are several annexes. Arwenack Annexe which was the original Falmouth School of Art, Wellington Terrace Annexe. Since 2002, the original Falmouth School of Art building has provided dedicated studios for master's students.

Falmouth Campus is managed by staff employed by the university, and a subsidiary company, Falmouth Exeter Plus (FX Plus), which is co-funded by the University of Exeter.

=== Penryn Campus ===
The Penryn Campus site was originally acquired by Falmouth College of Arts in 1998. The seventy-acre site was formerly a convent school for the community. Falmouth approached the University of Plymouth and the University of Exeter to see if they would show any interest in setting up a combined university campus. Both universities showed an interest but Plymouth later withdrew. The newly built campus opened in 2004 with the completion of the Daphne du Maurier building and first phase of student accommodation, and has seen significant growth in student numbers and facilities in the years since. Penryn Campus is the hub of the Combined Universities in Cornwall project, intending to improve the amount and quality of further and higher education available in Cornwall.

Penryn Campus is home to the Fashion & Textiles Institute, Games Academy, the Academy of Music and Theatre Arts, School of Photography and Cornwall Business School.

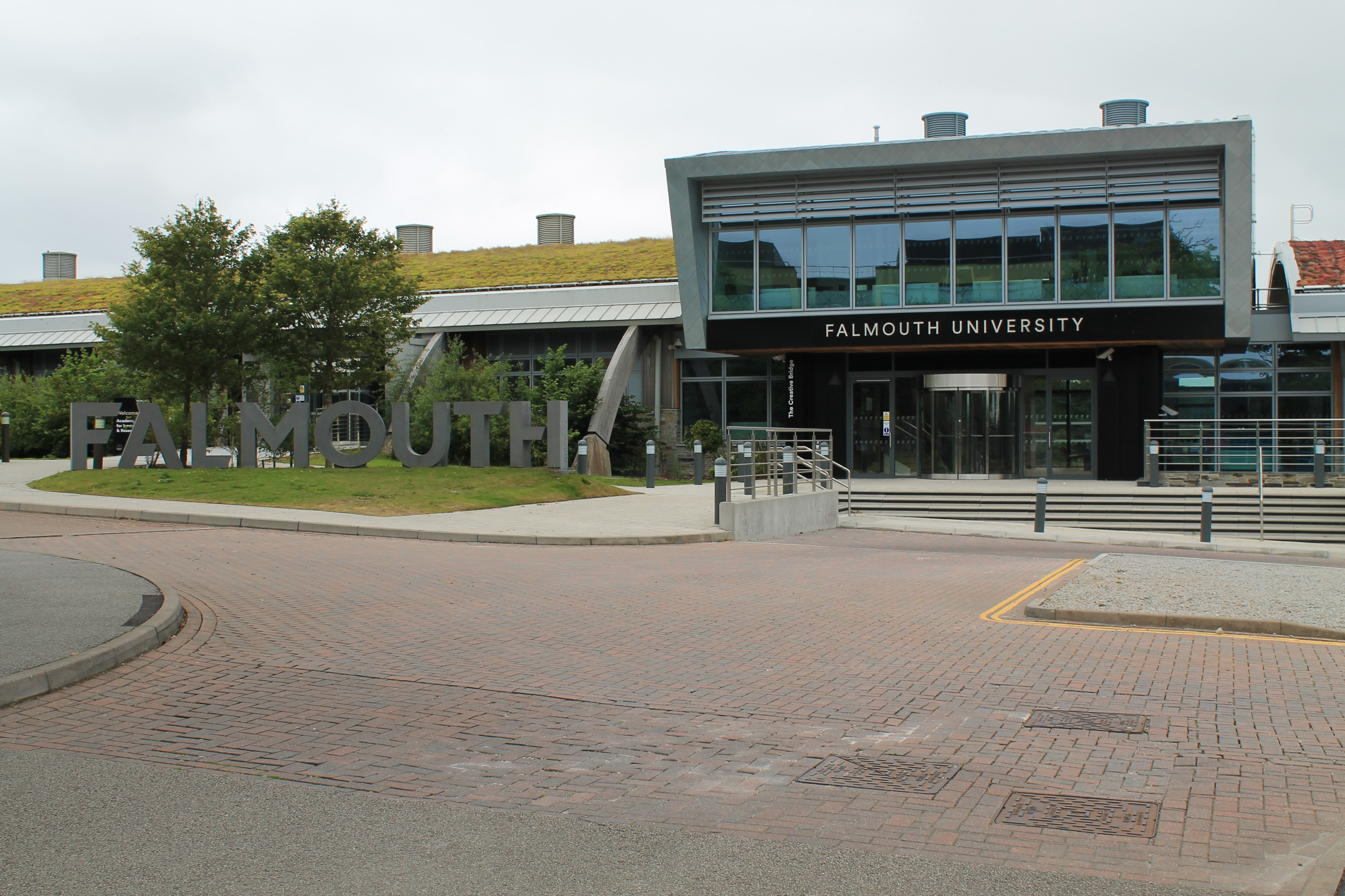
Penryn Campus at Falmouth University

Facilities and departments at Penryn include:

- Seminar and lecture rooms
- Library (including Archives and Special Collections)
- The Compass Student Service Desk
- Career Zone
- IT suite and IT support centre
- Refectory (The Stannary)
- Students' Union
- Sports Centre
- Multi-use games area
- Design Centre
- Photography Centre
- A public performance Centre, AMATA
- On Campus Residences (Glasney Parc and Glasney View)
- Academy of Innovation and Research

The bulk of investment in the campus has come through EU Objective One funding, matched by UK Government funding. Over £105 million of European and other funding has been invested in Phase One and Two of Penryn Campus' development. Recent projects on site include further student accommodation, sports facilities and AIR, the Academy for Innovation and Research. Construction of The Exchange, a £10 million joint project between Falmouth and Exeter to provide further study spaces and facilities as an extension of the Library, was completed in 2013.

Penryn Campus (as far as estates, and shared services and facilities) is managed by Falmouth Exeter Plus, a charity previously known as Tremough Campus Services, and a joint venture owned by Falmouth and Exeter.

=== Dartington Campus ===
The University College acquired its Dartington Campus in Totnes when it took over the administration of Dartington College of Arts in 2008 creating a third campus. The college later decided to close the campus and merge the students with its own student body in Penryn and Falmouth. A Performance Arts Centre was opened in 2010 and the Dartington Campus was closed, other courses merged straight into the already existing Falmouth courses. Traces of Dartington can be found at Penryn in various forms. These include the Dartington Society, Dartington colours throughout the Performance Centre and the inclusion of Dartington College's name under the Falmouth logo. It was announced in October 2012 that Bicton College will be taking over the Dartington Campus grounds.

=== Henry Scott Tuke House ===
Henry Scott Tuke House is 12 blocks of student purpose built accommodation opened in 1999. It is named after one of Falmouth's famous painters, Henry Scott Tuke. It provides accommodation for 156 primarily students studying at the Falmouth Campus.

=== Wellington Terrace Annexe ===
Wellington Terrace Annexe was opened in 1897 as a Board School for boys, built near the centre of Falmouth Town. Wellington Terrace Annexe hosted the studies for Foundation Degree students until summer 2017 when the Foundation Degree in Falmouth was concluded.

=== Arwenack Annexe ===
Arwenack Annexe was opened in August 1902 as Falmouth School of Art by Sir William Preece. The School relocated from Arwenack Avenue in the 1950s to Kerris Vean on Woodlane, which was built in 1875. The building is now home to independent businesses and agencies.

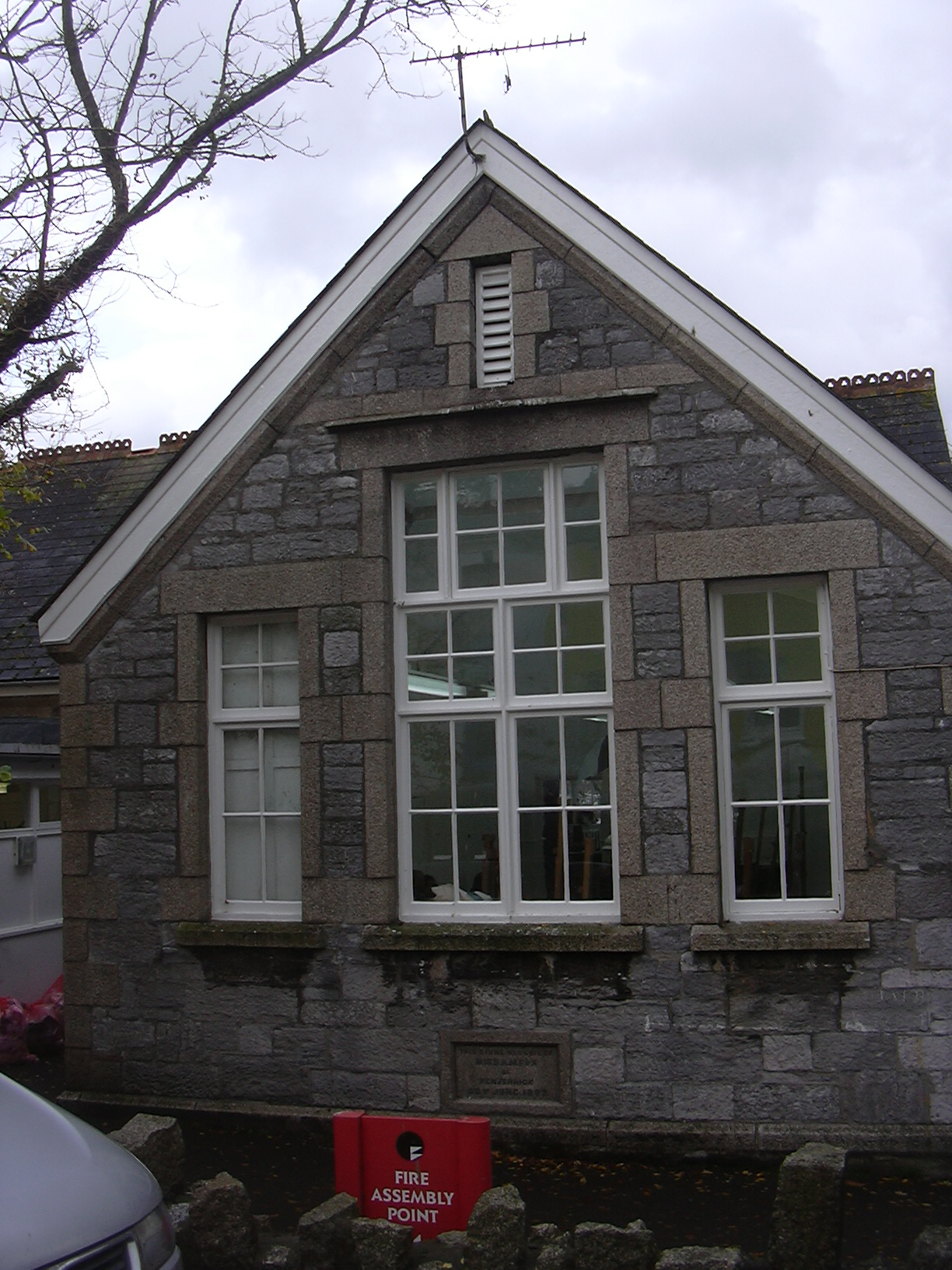
Wellington Terrace Annexe

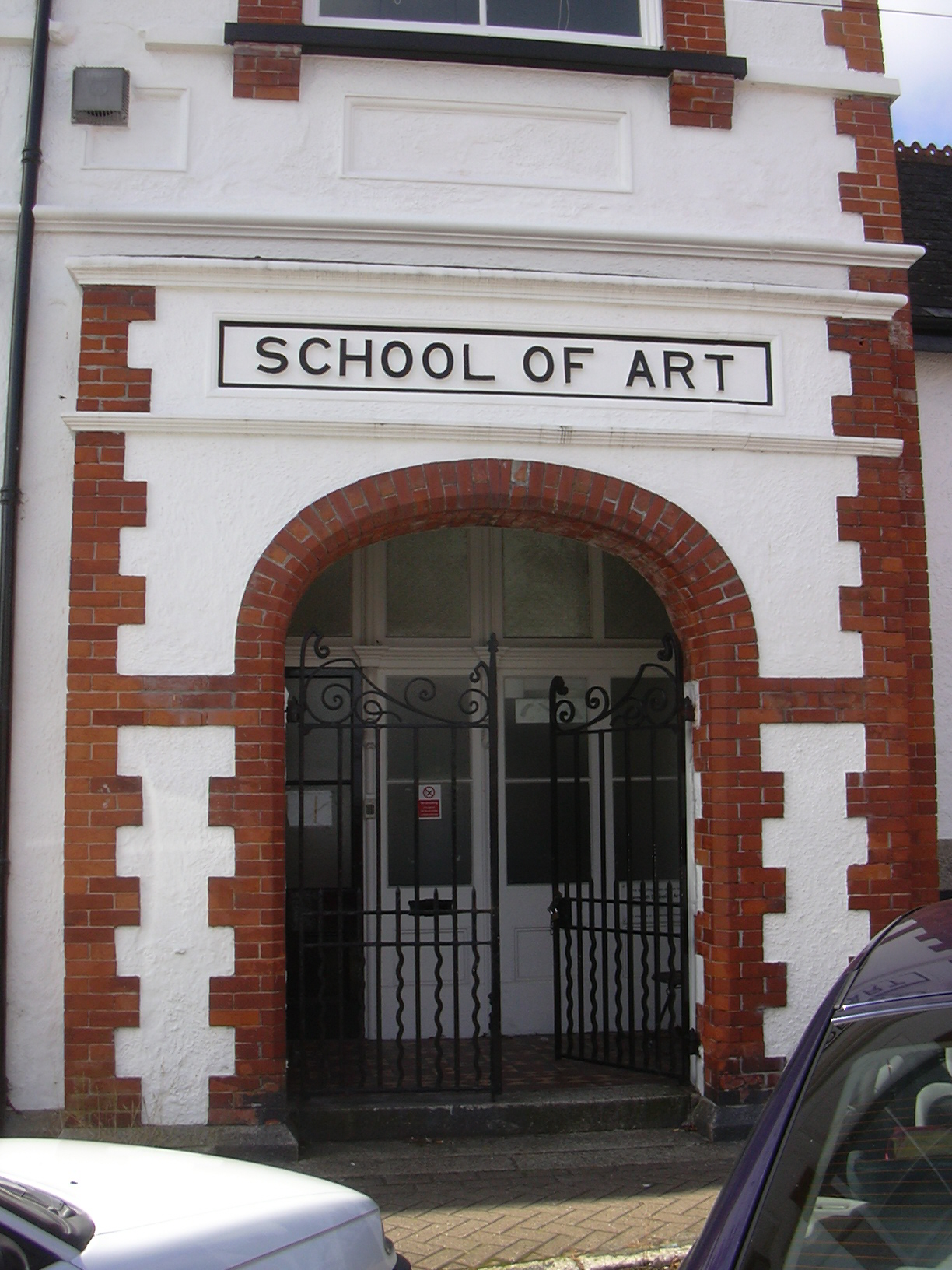
Arwenack Annexe

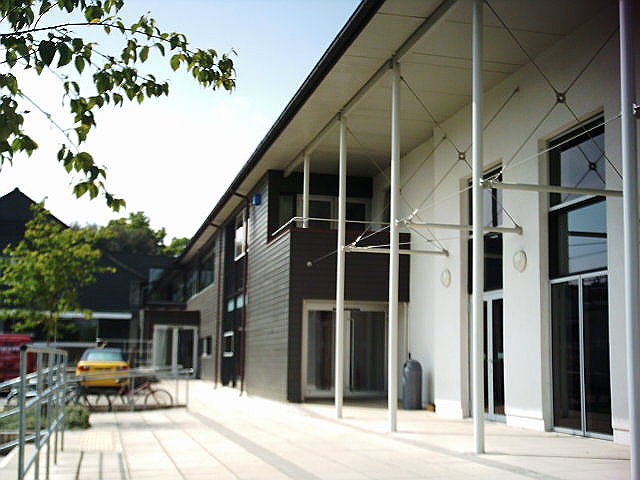
Dartington Campus

=== Libraries and archives ===
Falmouth University has two libraries, one at each main campus. The collections held at each library are broadly dictated by the subjects studied at each site.

As well as providing a service to staff and students, both of which are also open to the public.

Alongside the taught academic collections, the library holds a number of Archives and Special Collections:

- Bill Douglas and Peter Jewel Film Collection
- Camborne School of Mines Historical Records
- Cornish Poetry Collection
- Cornish Performance Archive including Kneehigh Theatre Archives
- Dartington College of Arts Archive
- Institute of Cornish Studies Archive Collection
- Map Collection
- Nick Darke Archive
- Patrick Gale: manuscript and unpublished works.

Archive Collections may be accessed by staff, students or members of the public, on an appointment basis.

Woodlane Library on Falmouth Campus specialises in art and design collections.

== Organisation and governance ==
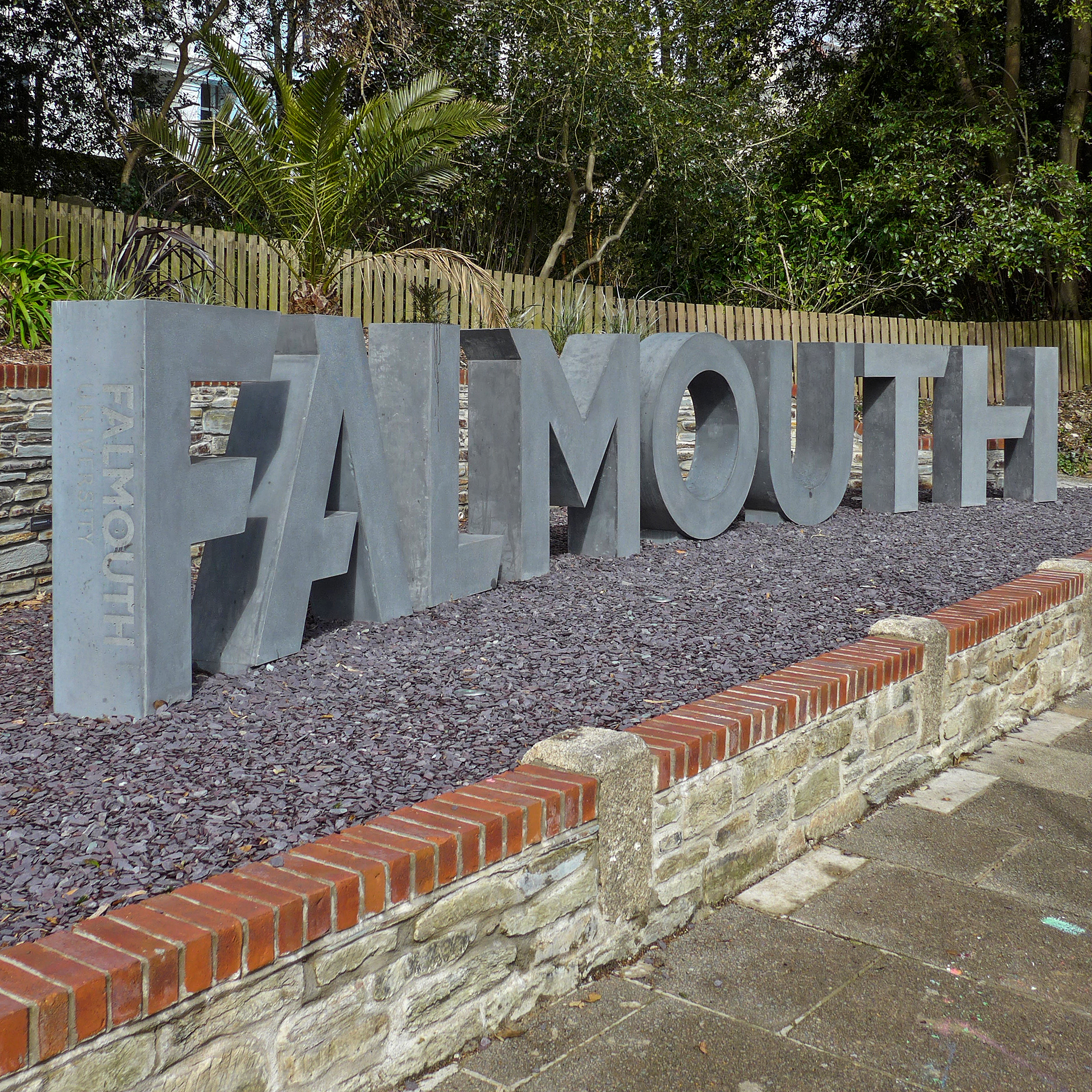
Falmouth University sign at Woodlane, by Falmouth Campus

The university is currently made up of several schools of study, each focusing on a specialism:

- The Falmouth School of Art
- The Games Academy
- The Academy of Music and Theatre Arts
- The Fashion & Textiles Institute
- The Institute of Photography
- The School of Film and Television
- The School of Architecture, Design and Interiors
- The School of Communication
- Cornwall Business School
- The Academy for Innovation & Research

The Academy of Music and Theatre Arts (AMATA) was created following the merger with Dartington College of Arts in 2008. In 2012 a new school was added known as the Academy for Innovation and Research allowing the college to offer research degrees.

== Coat of arms ==
The university's coat of arms was granted by the College of Arms on 15 October 2014. The arms are in the university's colours of white, black and 'Cornish Gold'. The arms depict a Falmouth packet ship demonstrating Falmouth's connection to the rest of the world. Atop the coat of arms is a crest which depicts a Cornish chough holding a paintbrush, pen and pencil – signifying that Falmouth University is truly a specialist institution of the arts. Just below this is a reference to Pendennis Castle. The coat of arms is reserved for graduation ceremonies and degree award certificates, thus demonstrating the power and authority of Cornwall's university.

The motto of the university is Creative, Connected, Courageous.

== Academic profile ==
=== Rankings and reputation ===
Rankings
National rankings
- Complete (2027): 64
- Guardian (2027): 81
- Times / Sunday Times (2027): 89

== Student Union ==
The Student Union, "FXU", is the representative body of the students of Falmouth University and the University of Exeter, Cornwall Campus, on the campuses of Falmouth and Penryn. FXU organises events for students throughout the year, facilitates community action and volunteering, provides an opportunity for sporting involvement and offers student welfare advice. It was recognised by the National Union of Students in the 2015 NUS awards, when it won 'Small and Specialist Student Union of the Year', Green Impact Gold and Non-Commercial Students' Union of the Year. It was also runner-up in the UKCISA 'Most Internationalised Students' Union of the Year'.

== Notable alumni ==
- Laurence Anholt, visual artist
- Luisa Baldini, newsreader and presenter
- Stewart Brown, poet, artist and writer
- Rex Crowle, BAFTA-winning game developer
- Tacita Dean, visual artist
- Sarindar Dhaliwal, visual artist
- Lorna Dunkley, TV presenter
- Jago, children's book illustrator
- Liz Fuller, actress
- Gunnar Garfors, author, globetrotter and world record holder
- Neil Harbisson, cyborg activist and artist
- Toby Haynes, TV director
- Ben Howard, singer (did not graduate)
- Judy Inglis, painter
- Cosei Kawa, illustrator
- Hew Locke, visual artist
- Sophie Long, news presenter
- David Manley, visual artist
- Paul McGowan, visual artist
- Bob Moran, cartoonist
- Hugh O'Donne, visual artist
- Hugh Pym, broadcaster
- Tom Raffield, furniture and lighting designer
- Alex Randall, lighting design
- Ben Rivers, film maker
- Keith Salmon, visual artist
- Tim Shaw, visual artist
- David Tremlett, visual artist
- Julie Umerle, visual artist
- Kelly Warman, film maker
- Gerard Woodward, novelist and poet
- Lynette Yiadom-Boakye, visual artist
- Mohammad Rakibul Hasan, photographer and visual artist

== See also ==
- Armorial of UK universities
- List of universities in the United Kingdom
