= Alexander Randall =

Alexander or Alex Randall may refer to:

- Alexander Randall (Wisconsin politician) (1819–1872), former Governor of Wisconsin
- Alexander Randall (Maryland politician) (1803–1881), former Attorney General of Maryland
- Alex Randall, a character in the Outlander book series

== See also ==
- Alex Randall (Alexandra; born 1982), British lighting designer
- Alexander Rendell (born 1990), Thai actor
