= Hugh O'Donnell (artist) =

English painter (born 1950)

- Born: Hugh Francis O'Donnell; 4 June 1950 (age 76); London, England
- Known for: Painting, drawing, printmaking

Hugh O'Donnell (born 1950) is an English painter, printmaker and site-specific artist.

== Life and work ==
O'Donnell studied at Camberwell College of Arts, London; Falmouth University, Cornwall, England; University of Central England, Birmingham, England; University of Gloucestershire, England. In 1974-76 he traveled to Japan on a Japanese Monbusho Scholarship where he studied at Kyoto-Shiritsu Geijutsu Daigaku, Kyoto City University of Arts. While in Japan he continued painting, and in particular drawing. He had several exhibitions culminating with a one-person exhibition of works on paper in 1976 at the Nishimura Gallery, Tokyo. This exhibition was sponsored by the British Council and Nishimura Gallery. While on fellowship in Japan he also studied "Monumental Screen Painting of the Japanese Momoyama Period." He continued this study at the Royal College of Art (1977–79), London.

Although he had been exhibiting regularly since 1975, both in one-person and group shows, it was after exhibiting in the 1980 show British Art Now: An American Perspective at the Solomon R. Guggenheim Museum that O'Donnell became internationally recognized. He has exhibited extensively in New York, as well as throughout the USA, Japan, Europe, and the United Kingdom. Public venues include The Metropolitan Museum of Art, NY; The Museum of Modern Art, NY; The Royal Academy, London; The Walker Art Gallery, Minneapolis; Museum of Contemporary Art, Tokyo and The Museum of Modern Art, Kyoto, Japan; XLII Venice Biennale, Italy; Hirshhorn Museum, Washington DC and the IV Medellin Biennal, Colombia.

O'Donnell's work is in many museum collections including The Addison Gallery of American Art Andover, The Metropolitan Museum of Art, New York; Museum of Modern Art, New York; Solomon R Guggenheim Museum, New York; Rose Art Museum Boston, MA: Museum of Contemporary Art, San Diego; Virginia Museum of Fine Arts, Denver Museum of Art; Walker Arts Center, Minneapolis; National Gallery of Art, Washington D.C.; Yokohama Museum of Art Japan; Polk Museum of Art, Florida; Albright Knox Gallery, Buffalo; The Aldrich Museum of Contemporary Arts, CT; London Contemporary Arts Society; The Tate Gallery London; Victoria and Albert Museum, London; Arts Council of Great Britain; British Council, U.K.

O'Donnell has been Professor of Painting at Boston University College of Fine Arts, School of Visual Arts, since 1996.

O'Donnell's most recent one-person exhibition was held at the Morrison Gallery, Kent, Connecticut, in 2012.

In addition to continuing his development as a fine artist painter, since 1994 Hugh O'Donnell has also developed as a digital site-specific artist. He has created many site-specific digital print and video wall productions for companies such as Verizon, The Mohegan Sun Casino and most recently Canon USA.
