= Tom Raffield =

British lighting and homeware designer

Tom Raffield is a British lighting and homeware designer.

== Career ==
Tom Raffield Ltd. was founded by Raffield in 2008. Inspired by his degree in 3D Sustainability and Design undertaken at Falmouth College of Arts, Raffield based his business on the sustainable practice of steam bending. Raffield has taught steam bending practice to his team of workshop makers. Raffield currently designs products for the Tom Raffield range and large-scale bespoke projects, including the Royal Parks kiosks and RHS Chelsea Flower Show and has created new designs through hands-on projects.

Raffield was co-founder of the design company Sixixis, which is known for its environmentally sustainable designs sourced from local wood.

== Inspiration ==
Tom Raffield grew up in Exmoor, England. Raffield’s designs employ the traditional practice of steam bending. Raffield's interest in design began while studying at Falmouth College of Arts, where he came to the conclusion that the technique of using a chamber would not be able to create complex 3D bends for projects. Raffield developed a new steaming method to create the 3D bends which was seen in his furniture designs such as the Arc Chair, Loop Chair and lights including the No.1 Pendant, Cage Light.

== Awards ==
Winner of the Lighting Design Association’s Lighting Design Award 2011.

Winner of the Walpole Brands of Tomorrow Award for Emerging Talent 2017.

Chelsea Flower Show 2019 5 Star Tradestand Award.

Finalist of the RHS Chelsea Flower Show Product of the Year Award 2019, with a steam bent outdoor planter.

Darc Award Winner 2019 - Arame Wall Light, sustainable design and manufacture.
