= Toshio Arima =

Japanese businessman

Toshio Arima (有馬 利男, Arima Toshio; born May 31, 1942) is President and Representative Director, of the Fuji Xerox company of Tokyo, Japan.

He was educated at International Christian University College of Liberal Arts, Division of Social Sciences, graduating in 1967, after which he joined Fuji Xerox of which he became President and Representative Director in 2002. Under his direction, the company created a new business vision called Open Office Frontier or OOF. He became a member of United Nations Global Compact in 2007.
