= Iwao Ayusawa =

Japanese writer and diplomat (1894–1972)

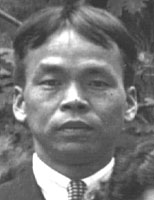
Iwao Ayusawa in Geneva, 1931

Iwao Frederick Ayusawa (鮎沢 巌, Ayusawa Iwao) (October 15, 1894 – November 30, 1972) was a diplomat and international authority on social and labor issues.

== Career ==
In 1911 he went to Hawaii as a recipient of the Friend Peace Scholarship. He graduated from Haverford College in 1917, and then attended the New York School of Social Work, from which he graduated in 1920. He served as the Japanese delegate to the International Labour Organization in Geneva, Switzerland, and as Director of the Tokyo branch of the ILO until 1939. He joined the staff of the International Christian University in 1952. In 1956, he received an honorary degree from Haverford College. He published several books and articles, including A History of Labor in Modern Japan in 1966. His papers are held by the library of Haverford College.

== Faith ==
Iwao Ayusawa was also a notable member of the small Japanese Quaker community, mainly represented by the Friends Center Committee which was formed some years before the war began to represent Friends to those of various countries who came to Japan with an interest in Quakerism, and to serve the Jewish refugees who were coming in large numbers to Japan at that time. He befriended Swiss Quakers Pierre Cérésole and Edmond Privat.

== Family ==
On October 14, 1922, Ayusawa married Tomiko Yoshioka. They had several children, Jun Ayusawa, Léman Ayusawa and a daughter Tsuyuko (born, Geneva 30 June 1923), who married Léopold d'Avout, the 5th duc d'Auerstaedt, and became the mother of the 6th French duc d'Auerstadt.

== Publications ==
- International labor legislation, New York, 1920
- Industrial conditions and labour legislation in Japan, Geneva : International Labour Office, 1926
- A History of Labor in Modern Japan, Honolulu, East-West Center Press, 1966
- International Labor Legislation. Clark, N.J.: Lawbook Exchange, 2005. ISBN 1-58477-461-4.
