= Kelly Warman =

Kelly Warman is a British film maker and artist based in London. Working since 2005, much of her work comprises scripted video works and staged performances that explore the translation of the interior monologue into the cinematic and architectural space. Her work is often characterised by a witty and overtly theatrical approach to the subject matter.

== Education ==
Kelly Warman studied at Chelsea College of Art and Design and University College Falmouth (former Dartington College of Arts) and gained her MFA from the Piet Zwart Institute, Willem de Kooning Academy, Rotterdam. In 2000 she was nominated for the PIL Emerging Artist Awarded at the LUX, London and in 2006 she was awarded the Huygens Scholarship from Nuffic. Her work was also nominated for the Fair Play Film and Video Awards in Berlin and the Promotion Prize at the Piet Zwart Institute graduation exhibition Wherein Certain Person... in TENT., Rotterdam.

== Career ==
Recently her video work featured in the Vienna Biennale and the International Architecture Biennale Rotterdam. She has also exhibited her work in Museum Boijmans Van Beuningen (Rotterdam) P.P.O.W Gallery (New York) Witte de With (Rotterdam) LUX (London) Lothringer 13 (Munich) and Catalyst Arts (Belfast). She has performed at the London International Festival of Theatre (LIFT), the Arcola Theatre and the Battersea Arts Centre (BAC) with the experimental OMSK Art Collective in London.

In a review of her collaborative piece ProgRock made with Tobias Laukemper Frieze editor Jan Verwoert wrote "...what they say and do, on one hand, is dead serious as it openly articulates a concern to produce an art that truthfully reflects the conditions of its own production. The conspicuous theatricality of their performance, on the other hand, suspends and displaces the meaning of any word or gesture...".
