= Paul McGowan (artist) =

English painter

- Born: 1967 (age 58–59); Margate, Kent, UK
- Known for: Contemporary art

Paul McGowan (born 1967 in Margate) is an artist, fashion designer and formerly the artist in residence at the Eden Project. He is a former student of the Falmouth School of Art, and had his first exhibition in St Ives while still a student.

== Biography ==
McGowan established himself as a fashion designer at a young age, becoming the youngest designer to have ever sold a collection to fashion house Browns at the age of 20, and went on to work for a variety of well-known fashion industry names including Gianni Versace.

He won the Tate magazine award while still a student.

Autism, Asperger's and Art

A meeting with Tim Smit at a charity auction led to McGowan becoming artist-in-residence at the Eden Project in Cornwall and the appearance of his paintings in the Mediterranean Biome under the title "Living on the Edge".

Art and the Eden Project

A triptych from Paul McGowan, working with illustrators Mark Lascelles Thornton and Michael Cole, and artist Chris Stocker was donated to the SpectrumArt 2009 Auction. The auction is to raise funds for the Cornish charity working with those affected by autistic spectrum disorders. The piece was inspired by a genuine Dartmoor Prison door which had been graffitied by prisoners and which McGowan had at his studio.

In June 2010 Police in riot gear were sent to raid central London gallery Mauger Modern Art after a fake bomb in the window which was part of Paul McGowan’s exhibition ‘Precipice’ had caused reports of a "suspicious” device.

During 2010 Paul McGowan opened three progressive bodies of work that follow on from the Eden Project's "Living on The Edge" Program. Each of the 3 shows have its own identity. These new works were produced on McGowan's Ark Studio that was given to him by Spectrum, a Cornish autism charity that is heading a pioneering study in the relationship between autism and art. A program that McGowan is participating in and helping Spectrum to develop. In each of the shows a selection of work from McGowan's experimental ‘Blockhead Project' will be exhibited. These works will include an audio piece made for the project by American guitar Legend Gary Lucas who has previously worked with Jeff Buckley and Captain Beefheart.

In 2010 Paul McGowan's 'Knuckle Buster' studio was raided by art thieves, causing him to lose the majority of his archived work spanning 2 decades. After this, McGowan cancelled all exhibitions and interviews while he produced a new catalogue of works. The new work included a series of artworks informed by children as victims of war that raised funds for the charity War Child. The exhibition titled 'Trigger Finger' was launched at The Drang Gallery in Sept 2013. The work was subversive, consisting of bright coloured limited edition prints that depicted children, using biomorphic images constructed from weapons of violence.

McGowan also continued collaborating with American guitarist Gary Lucas who worked with Captain Beefheart and co-wrote Grace with Jeff Buckley. They released an audio visual collaboration that included a limited edition 7-inch single on green vinyl. McGowan also produced the artwork for the Gary Lucas & Gods and Monsters Album The Ordeal Of Civility.

In December 2013 and December 2014, McGowan, Banksy, Ben Allen, Inkie and other artists collaborating with London West Bank Gallery were included in the event ‘Smile Britannia’. 'Smile Britannia' is an annual charity art auction held at the Houses of Parliament. The event was established in 2013 and benefits three organisations; the Smile Britannia Project - benefiting disadvantaged communities in London, The Last Night a DJ Saved My Life Foundation, and Temwa.

In 2014 McGowan was included in London Westbank Gallery’s annual Urban in Ibiza exhibition that features artworks from the gallery’s international network of street, graffiti and contemporary artists.

== Artwork ==
=== "The Divinity Of Monsters" ===
Triptych is an experimental artwork that took two years to complete. The work went through many stages and mediums and was produced for the Blockhead Project. The artists involved were Paul McGowan creative director, Chris Stocker, Mark Lascelles Thornton and Michael Cole. McGowan gave each artist an individual brief. Each artist interpreted the brief in their own way not knowing the others brief. Then the work was placed through various treatments by Chris Stocker and composed by Paul McGowan.

=== "Make Up" ===
- 2008
- 94 cm x 120 cm
- Oil on paper

This work is from McGowan's body of work that was produced for the Eden Projects "Living on the Edge Project". With this piece McGowan confronted how animals are used in the development of cosmetics for our superficial longing for a priceless vanity.

=== "Friday Night Saturday Morning" ===
This piece was created by filming McGowan drinking and smoking at the table. Examining the process involved in making art and questioning the social relevance and existence of art today. The next day the table was presented as the completed work. The T.V on the table shows a film that was shot during the making session. The piece was filmed in December 1996 and McGowan has refused to exhibit the final work due to one of the original cigarettes being removed from the piece the next day. Stating "The piece has been corrupted.The integrity of the work has to be maintained for it to operate with any real meaning".

=== "Worship Me" ===
- 2009
- 94 cm x 150 cm
- Oil on paper

This piece is from McGowan's new works examining the glorification of lifestyles and its effect and implications on our established belief systems.

=== "BlockHead - SexyBomb" ===
- 2009

Paul McGowan is part of BlockHead, a collaboration of artists including Gary Lucas, Hin, Mark Lascelles, Chris Stocker and Samuel Webster.

=== Private life ===
Paul lives with professional musician Dominique Olliver. By his own admission Paul says he supports American President Donald Trump. He describes his twitter feed as, "I’m just a man ordained by god to search & destroy progressives commies Marxists socialists. Exposing religious degeneracy & defending women and children."
