= Alex Randall =

English artist (born 1982)

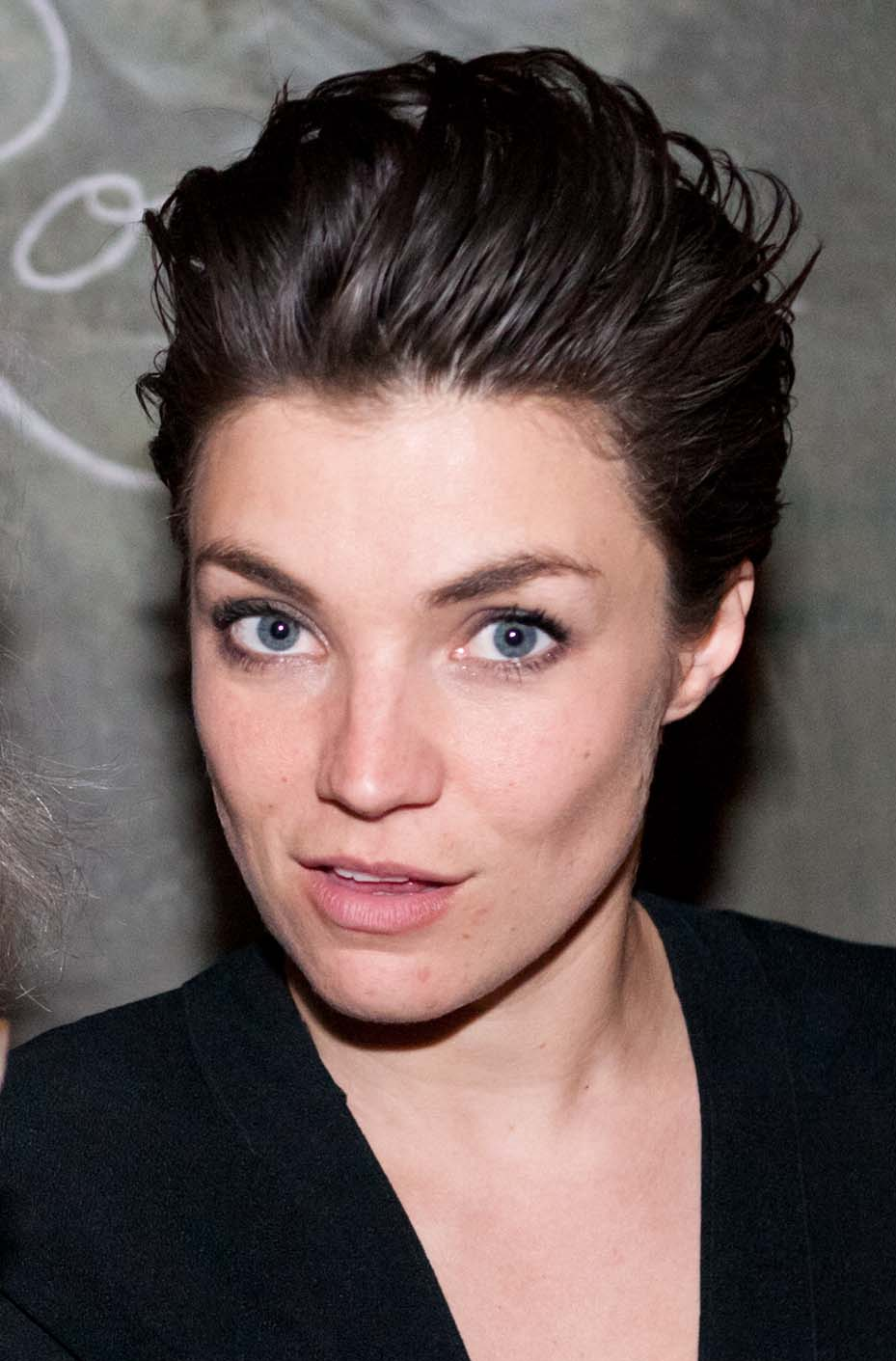
- Born: Alexandra Verity Randall; August 1982 (age 44); Reading, Berkshire, England
- Education: Falmouth College of Art; Chelsea School of Art; Surrey Institute of Art & Design, University College
- Known for: Artist, lighting designer, writer
- Awards: 2011 Bespoke Silver, Prix de la Photographie In collaboration with Claire Rosen; 2011 Bespoke Gold, Prix de la Photographie In collaboration with Claire Rosen; 2010 Bespoke Short List, Sony World Awards In collaboration with Claire Rosen; 2007 The Most Promising Newcomer Award by Liberty
- Website: www.alexrandall.co.uk

Alexandra Verity Randall (born August 1982) is an English lighting designer and artist. She is known for her use of unconventional materials in large-scale chandeliers, such as taxidermy rawhide and salvaged materials. Her studio is based in London.

== Early life and education ==
Randall is from Berkshire. She first attended the Chelsea School of Art where she studied sculpture and later Falmouth College of Art where she completed an MA in Professional Writing.

== Career ==
In 2006, Randall started her career as a lighting artist and designed her first piece, the award-winning Bakelite Telephone Lamp In 2007 Randall's work started making its way into the marketplace in stores such as Liberty and Harvey Nichols.

Randall's work normally finds its way into boutique hotels, restaurants and private residences as well as the clothing brand Ted Baker. She has designed much of their bespoke lighting pieces for their international stores.

The Carriers

In 2008, Randall started working in the medium of taxidermy. She chooses work only with already dead or culled animals and so has worked a lot with vermin. Works in this vein range from The Carriers to The Rat Swarm Lamp ‘The most nightmarish lamp ever produced’ and Squirrel Wall Lights.

Randall works collaboratively with the photographer Claire Rosen Their images have won multiple awards.

Randall is involved with the charity Freddie For A Day, creating a large scale cast of the statue of Freddie Mercury for the benefit of the charity.

In 2012, Randall was invited by the boutique Hong Kong based store Lane Crawford to exhibit.

== Selected shows ==
- 2012 Lane Crawford, Hong Kong
- 2011 The memory collection, The Russian club, Dalston
- 2011 Guest Speaker- The Day of Light, the Netherlands
- 2011 Solo show, Ken Fulk, San Francisco
- 2010 Tent London
- 2010 ‘The Future Perfect’ New York
- 2009 Stuff and Nonsense. London.
- 2009 '100% Design', .
- 2008 'Where To?' Solo Show. London.
- 2008 'Pulse', London.
- 2008 '100% Design', London.
- 2008 'Trash Luxe', Liberty Department Store, London.
- 2007 'Pulse', London.
- 2007 '100% Design', London.

== Major artworks ==
- The Antler Chandelier (2010)
- Bakelite Phone Lamps (2006)
- The Carriers (2011)
- Duck Desk Lamp (2009)
- In Memory Of Freddie (2011)
- The Gramophone Chandelier (2007)
- Organ Pipe Chandelier (2008)
- Pigeon pendants (2008)
- The Rat Swarm Lamp (2010)
- Saw Blade Chandelier (2010)
- Squirrel Wall lights (2010)
- In Memory Of Triumph (2011)
