= Comparative cultural studies =

Comparative cultural studies is a contextual approach to the study of culture in a global and intercultural context. Focus is placed on the theory, method, and application of the study process(es) rather than on the "what" of the object(s) of study.

== Overview ==
In comparative cultural studies, selected tenets of comparative literature are merged with selected tenets of the field of cultural studies (including culture theories, (radical) constructivism, communication theories, and systems theories) with the objective to study culture and culture products (including but not restricted to literature, communication, media, art, etc.). This is performed in a contextual and relational construction and with a plurality of methods and approaches, interdisciplinary, and, if and when required, including teamwork. In comparative cultural studies, it is the processes of communicative action(s) in culture and the how of these processes that constitute the main objectives of research and study. However, scholarship in comparative cultural studies does not exclude textual analysis proper of other established fields of study. In comparative cultural studies, ideally, the framework of and methodologies available in the systemic and empirical study of culture are favored. Scholarship in comparative cultural studies includes the theoretical, as well as methodological and applied postulate to move and to dialogue between cultures, languages, literature, and disciplines: attention to other cultures against essentialist notions and practices and beyond the paradigm of the nation-state is a basic and founding element of the framework and its application.

== See also ==
- Counterculture
- Cross-cultural studies
- Cultural anthropology
- Cultural assimilation
- Ethnology
