= Temwa (charity) =

Organization

- Founded: 2003
- Founder: Jo Hook; Sophie Elson
- Registration no.: 1101090
- Location: Bristol, United Kingdom
- Region served: Malawi
- Employees: 23
- Website: temwa.org

Temwa is a registered UK charity. Operating in Malawi, central Africa, Temwa works mainly in one region known as Usisya on a number of different community driven projects including Education, Health, Skills Development and Agriculture.

== Short history ==
Temwa dates back to 2003 when it was founded by two Bristol girls, Jo Hook and Sophie Elson. The idea was initially conceived three years before while Jo and Sophie were working in Malawi. After three years of fund raising they returned to Malawi and started to build a community center.

== Current projects ==
Education and Schools are one of the areas Temwa continue to work in, providing library services and schools support throughout the region of Usisya

Health Education projects run by Temwa include AIDS Action Clubs and mobile HIV/AIDS testing clinics as well as awareness raising through mobile video shows. Temwa has established HIV & AIDS Action Clubs (AACs) in all 32 primary schools and 6 secondary schools in the Nkhata Bay North region. These provide health education, income-generating activities for orphans and vulnerable children, sport/gaming activities, advocacy and support for youth. Mobile video shows are also run regularly to educate the children. The objective of AACs is to help adolescents prepare to take responsibility for their own sexual and reproductive health in the fight against HIV & AIDS. HIV/AIDs awareness group Purple Field productions worked with Temwa on a project to raise AIDs awareness throughout the region through film.HIV/AIDs awareness group Purple Field productions worked with Temwa on a project to raise AIDs awareness throughout the region.

Agriculture is encouraged through a range of projects, including a demonstration garden and an ongoing project with the International Tree Foundation to plant many fruit and other trees throughout the region.

== Fundraising ==
Temwa has a strong association with the Bristol music scene and gigs by many local bands including Babyhead and The Zen Hussies along with club nights have all helped raise funds for this charity.

Temwa also has raised money through corporate sponsors Commercial Vehicle Solutions and the fashionable fundraisers Bottle Top.
