= Claire Rosen =

American fine art photographer (born 1983)

- Born: 1983 (age 42–43); New York
- Education: Savannah College of Art and Design (SCAD)
- Known for: Photography
- Notable work: Birds of a Feather
- Style: Conceptual
- Partner(s): Dolly and Edward Rosen
- Website: claire-rosen.com

Claire Rosen (born 1983) is an American fine art photographer based in New York. She was included in Forbes magazine's "30 Under 30" list in Art & Design for 2012 and 2013 in Art & Style.

== Work ==
Rosen's artistic style incorporates anthropomorphic animals, archetypal heroines, and symbolic still-life arrangements. Influenced by the aesthetics of the Pre-Raphaelites, her work often references the Victorian era. Her photographs are held in public and private collections.

== Early life ==
Born in New York in 1983 and raised in New Jersey, Rosen is the eldest daughter of Dolly and Edward Rosen. Her mother is a culinary historian specializing in Victorian-era cake baking, and her father is a banking and intellectual property lawyer. As a child, she would drape her younger sisters in sheets and pose them in the family's backyard. Her mother read to them from Grimm's Fairy Tales, Beatrix Potter, Alice's Adventures in Wonderland, and L. Frank Baum. Frequent trips to the zoo, the circus, and the Museum of Natural History fostered an interest in animals and taxidermy, themes that have appeared in her later work.

While interested in art as a youth, she did not pursue visual art until college, when she took her first photography class.

Rosen attended Bard College at Simon's Rock, graduating with a liberal arts degree in 2003. She then attended the Savannah College of Art and Design (SCAD), where she further developed her technical skills and was mentored by Steve Ashman, a physicist-turned-photo instructor. She earned her Bachelor of Fine Arts degree in photography in 2006.

== Career ==
=== Rockport, Maine ===
After graduating from SCAD, Rosen completed a three-month internship with Joyce Tenneson at the Maine Media Workshops in Rockport. She then managed Tenneson's studio for two and a half years. During this period, Rosen began reading the works of Carl Jung, Freud, Joseph Campbell, and Bruno Bettelheim, which influenced her artistic development. She also met Cig Harvey, whom she cites as a role model. While in Rockport, Rosen created the photo series Fairy Tales and Other Stories, a collection of self-portraits, and Dolls in the Attic.

=== New York ===
In 2009, Rosen returned to New York to work as an independent artist, exhibiting her work in juried shows. Her Fairy Tales and Other Stories series garnered attention, leading to magazine publications. She then began commercial work, creating commissioned images for book covers, clothing designers, and other organizations, including National Geographic Magazine, Fujifilm US, Alex Randall Chandeliers, Neiman Marcus at Short Hills, Smithsonian Magazine, and Random House Book.

=== The Millbrook Collection ===
In 2010, Rosen, as artist-in-residence at the Millbrook School in Duchess County, photographed the school's vintage taxidermy collection. The collection, dating back to the early 20th century, included 10,000 eggs and approximately 500 taxidermied animals, birds, and reptiles. Rosen documented these pieces, often incorporating their original records and isolating each specimen against a black background.

=== Birds of a Feather ===
Created in 2012, Birds of a Feather is one of Rosen's most recognized photographic series. The series features portraits of live birds, ranging from common pets like parakeets to exotic species like the Hyacinth Macaw, posed against historical and reproduction wallpaper and fabric from the Victorian Era. Rosen has described the series as referencing "that desire to possess the beautiful and exotic" that emerged from the Victorian Era's disconnect from nature juxtaposed with its increased awareness of faraway places and creatures. Inspired by Bird Paradise, a New Jersey exotic bird store, Rosen used traditional portrait lighting techniques and wallpaper backdrops to create the images.

=== Fantastical Feasts ===
Rosen's 2014 photo series Fantastical Feasts depicts various animal species gathered around banquet tables, consuming their preferred foods, in compositions reminiscent of Leonardo da Vinci's The Last Supper.

=== Lectures ===
Rosen has led photography workshops internationally at institutions including B&H, Gulf Photo Plus, SCAD, and the Hallmark Institute of Photography. She has also given an artist talk at the National Geographic Photography Seminar in Washington, D.C.

== Personal life ==
Encouraged by creative consultant Beth Taubner of Mercurylab to research her family history, Rosen discovered that her maternal grandfather, who died when her mother was young, was a Hollywood fashion photographer who often posed starlets with animals, a striking parallel to Rosen's own work.

== Photo series ==
- Anthropodia, 2015
- Fantastical Feasts, 2014
- Nostalgia: A Study In Color, 2013
- Birds of a Feather, 2012
- Millbrook Collection, 2010
- Dolls in the Attic, 2009
- Fairy Tales and Other Stories, 2008

== Exhibitions ==
- Imaginarium UPI Gallery, Brooklyn, NY, 2017
- The Fence: Birds of Prey Photoville Atlanta, Boston, Brooklyn, Houston and Santa Fe, 2017
- Identity: The List Portraits, Annenberg Space for Photography, Los Angeles, CA
- Birds of a Feather, Indian Photo Festival, Hyderabad, India
- Fantastical Feasts, Cede Gallery Booth at Lima Photo, Lima, Peru
- Birds of a Feather, Regina Gallery, Seoul, South Korea
- The Fence: Arthropodia, Photoville Atlanta, Boston, Brooklyn, Houston and Santa Fe
- Pleasing Illusions, Korogram, Seoul, South Korea
- Birds of a Feather, SCAD Booth – Hong Kong Art Central, China
- Birds of a Feather, GPP Gallery, Dubai, UAE
- Birds of a Feather, Summit Public Art, Summit, NJ
- Birds of a Feather, Outdoor Lightbox Installation, SCAD Atlanta, GA
- Miniature Pony Feast, SCAD Lacoste, France
- SCADFASH 300: Nostalgia for Daniel Lismore Exhibit, SCADFASH Museum Atlanta, GA
- The Evidence Project, Ciara Struwig, South Africa
- Birds of a Feather Center for Photography at Woodstock, Woodstock, NY, 2015
- Reverie SCAD Museum of Art, Savannah, GA, 2013

== Awards and features ==
- PDN Photo Annual, 2018
- Short List, Communications Arts, 2018
- The Fence, Photoville, 2017
- Long List, Aesthetica Art Prize, 2016
- Selected Photographer, The Fence, Photoville, 2016
- Critical Mass Finalist, Photolucinda, 2016
- Featured Artist, Der Greif magazine, issue 8, April 2015
- Featured Photographer, Communication Arts magazine, Design Annual, Sept/Oct 2015
- Selected Photographer, The Fence, Photoville, 2015
- Selected Photographer, The Fence, Photoville, 2014
- Second place, Professional Advertising, Prix de la Photographie, 2014
- First place, Pro Still Life, International Photo Awards, 2014
- Selected Photographer, The Fence, Photoville, 2013
- 30 Brightest Under 30 in Art and Style, Forbes Magazine, 2013
- 30 Brightest Under 30 in Art and Design, Forbes Magazine, 2012
- Second place, Professional Advertising, Prix de la Photographie, 2012
- Second place, Professional Advertising, Prix de la Photographie, 2011
- Second place, Pro Self Portrait, International Photography Awards, 2010
- First place, Fashion Advertising, Prix de la Photographie, 2010
- First place, Self Portraiture, Prix de la Photographie, 2009
