= Cosei Kawa =

Japanese children's book illustrator

Cosei Kawa is an illustrator of children's books and an associate professor at Shizuoka University of Art and Culture.

== Books ==
- Deborah's Tree (Lerner, 2022)
- Asa the Rock Cutter (Collins, 2022)
- Carpe Diem (Fushiana-sha, 2020)
- An Unlikely Ballerina (Kar-Ben, 2018)
- The Tigon and the Liger (Lantana Publishing, 2016)
- Feeding the Flying Fanellis (Carolhroda Books, 2015)
- Two Dragon Tales (HarperCollins, 2015)
- Rifka Takes a Bow (Kar-Ben, 2013)
- How to Persuade a Grumpy Goddess (Pearson, 2013)
- The Three Princes (HarperCollins, 2011)
- Issun Boshi (Franklin Watts, 2010)

== Awards ==
- Independent Publisher Book Award / A bronze medal (2016)
- Lee Bennett Hopkins Poetry Award / Honor books (2016)
- CCBC (Cooperative Children's Book Center) choice (2014)
- Sydney Taylor Book Award, Honor Book / A silver medal (2014)
- Best Children's Book of the Year by Children's Book Committee at Bank Street College (2014)
- Kirkus Best Children's Books (2013)
