= Sōbu Line (Rapid) =

Railway line in Japan

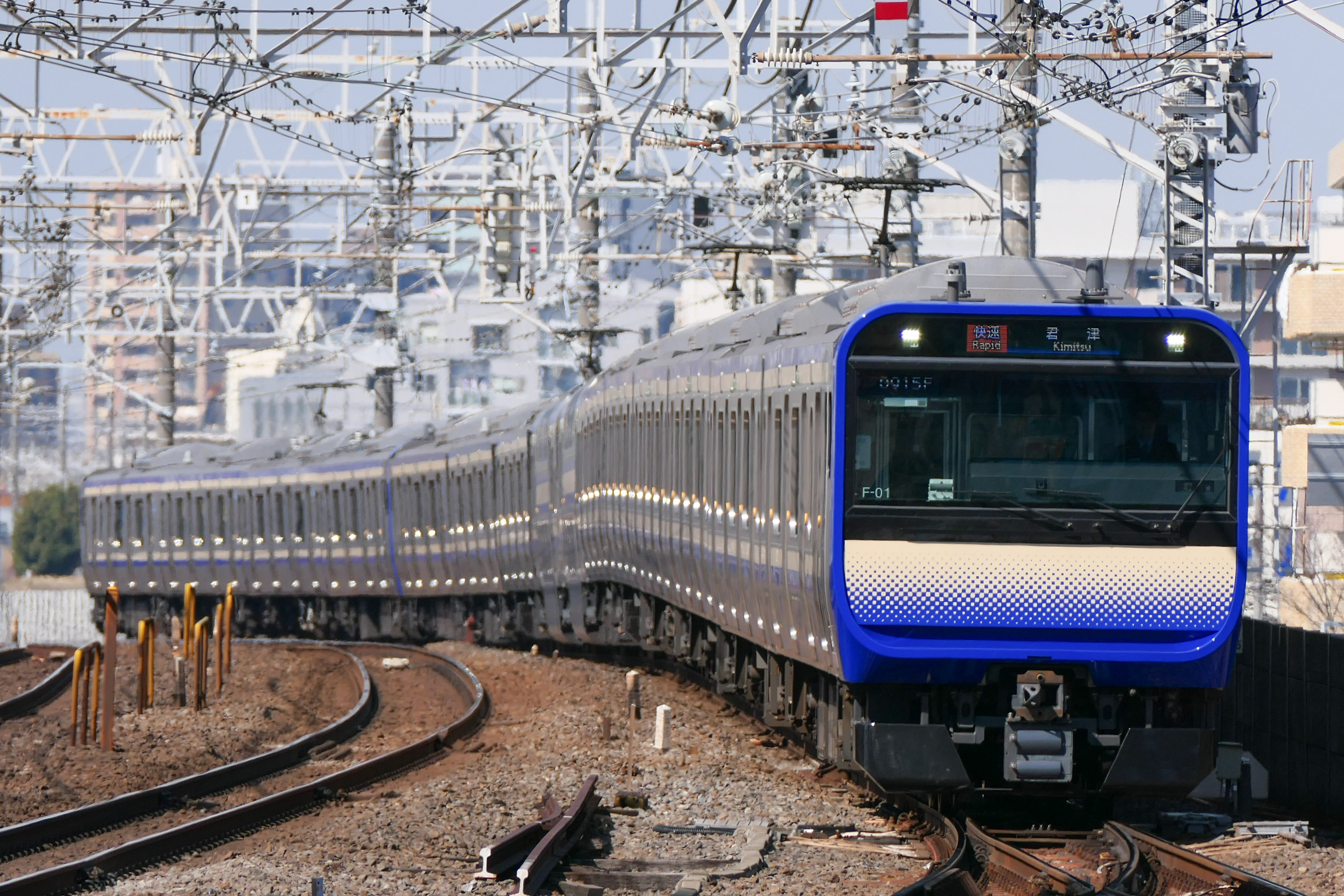
- An E235 series EMU at Ichikawa Station

Overview
- Locale: Tokyo, Chiba prefectures
- Termini: Tokyo; Chiba
- Stations: 10

Service
- Type: Commuter rail
- Operator: JR East
- Daily ridership: 693,998 (daily 2015)

History
- Opened: 12 July 1972; 54 years ago

Technical
- Line length: 60.2 km (37.4 mi)
- Track gauge: 1,067 mm (3 ft 6 in)
- Electrification: Overhead line, 1,500 V DC
- Operating speed: 120 km/h (75 mph)
Route map
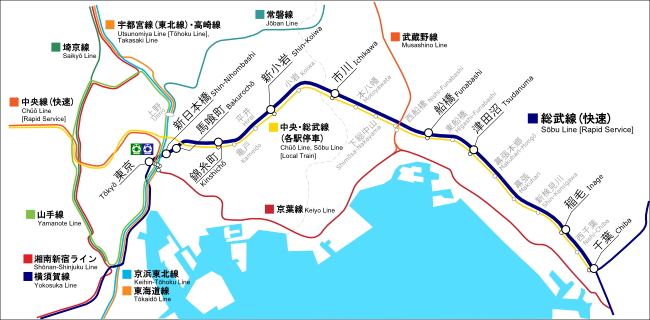

The Sōbu Line (Rapid) (Japanese: 総武快速線, romanized: Sōbu-kaisoku-sen) is a railway service on the Sōbu Main Line in Tokyo and Chiba Prefecture, Japan, operated by East Japan Railway Company (JR East). It connects Tokyo Station in Chūō, Tokyo with Chiba Station in Chūō-ku, Chiba via the cities of Ichikawa, Funabashi, and Narashino.

== Services ==
Rapid services on the Sōbu Line are primarily operated between Tokyo and Chiba, although there are many through services onto the Yokosuka Line as well as some through services operated from the Yokosuka Line via Tokyo terminating at Tsudanuma. During weekday morning peak periods Tokyo-bound trains arrive once every 3.2 minutes; this is reduced to 10 Chiba-bound trains per hour during weekday evening peak periods. At other times there are approximately six trains per hour. There are many through services operated onto other lines.

For information on the Narita Express, Shiosai, and other limited express services, see their respective articles.

Sōbu Line (Rapid) trains travel through onto the Yokosuka Line to Ōfuna, Zushi, and Kurihama. Trains also travel through beyond Chiba to as far as:

- Kazusa-Ichinomiya on the Sotobō Line
- Kimitsu on the Uchibō Line
- Narita Airport via Narita on the Narita Line
- Kashima-Jingū on the Kashima Line
- Narutō on the Sōbu Main Line

=== Past services ===
==== Home Liner Chiba ====
Before 16 March 2019, there were five Home Liner Chiba commuter liner services that operated every weekday evening, four of which started from Tokyo and another which started at Shinjuku.

Stations served:

(Shinjuku – Akihabara) / Tokyo – Tsudanuma – Inage – Chiba

==== Commuter Rapid ====
Commuter Rapid services were abolished with the timetable revision on 12 March 2022. Prior to this they ran on weekday peak hours only, stopping at Tōkyō, Shin-Nihombashi, Bakurochō, Kinshichō, Funabashi, and Chiba.

== Station list ==
- For information on local services between Kinshichō and Chiba, see the Chūō-Sōbu Line article.
- All rapid trains stop at all stations listed below.

| No. | Station | Distance in km (mi) | | Transfers | Location | |
| No. | Station | Between stations | Total | Transfers | Location | |
|---|---|---|---|---|---|---|
↑ Through-running to/from Kurihama via the Yokosuka Line ↑
| | Tokyo 東京 | —N/a | 0 (0) | Yokosuka Line (through service); Tokaido Shinkansen; Tōhoku Shinkansen (Hokkaido, Akita, Yamagata); Jōetsu Shinkansen; Hokuriku Shinkansen; Yamanote Line (JY01); Keihin–Tōhoku Line (JK26); Chūō Line (JC01); Tōkaidō Line (JT01); Ueno–Tokyo Line (JU01); Keiyō Line (JE01); Marunouchi Line (M-17) | Chiyoda | Tokyo |
| JO20 | Shin-Nihombashi 新日本橋 | 1.2 (0.75) | 1.2 (0.75) | Tokyo Metro Ginza Line (Mitsukoshimae: G-12); Tokyo Metro Hanzomon Line (Mitsukoshimae: Z-09) | Chūō | Tokyo |
| JO21 | Bakurochō 馬喰町 | 1.1 (0.68) | 2.3 (1.4) | Toei Asakusa Line (Higashi-nihombashi: A-15); Toei Shinjuku Line (Bakuroyokoyama: S-09) | Chūō | Tokyo |
| JO22 | Kinshichō 錦糸町 | 2.5 (1.6) | 4.8 (3.0) | Chūō-Sōbu Line (JB22); Tokyo Metro Hanzomon Line (Z-13) | Sumida | Tokyo |
| JO23 | Shin-Koiwa 新小岩 | 5.2 (3.2) | 10.0 (6.2) | Chūō–Sōbu Line (JB25) | Katsushika | Tokyo |
| JO24 | Ichikawa 市川 | 5.4 (3.4) | 15.4 (9.6) | Chūō–Sōbu Line (JB27) | Ichikawa | Chiba |
| JO25 | Funabashi 船橋 | 7.8 (4.8) | 23.2 (14.4) | Chūō–Sōbu Line (JB31); Tobu Urban Park Line (TD35); Keisei Main Line (Keisei Funabashi: KS22) | Funabashi | Chiba |
| JO26 | Tsudanuma 津田沼 | 3.5 (2.2) | 26.7 (16.6) | Chūō–Sōbu Line (JB33); Keisei Matsudo Line (Shin-Tsudanuma: KS66) | Narashino | Chiba |
| JO27 | Inage 稲毛 | 9.2 (5.7) | 35.9 (22.3) | Chūō–Sōbu Line (JB37) | Inage | Chiba |
| JO28 | Chiba 千葉 | 3.3 (2.1) | 39.2 (24.4) | Chūō–Sōbu Line (JB39); ■ Sōbu Main Line (through service); ■ Narita Line (through service); ■ Sotobō Line (through service); ■ Uchibō Line (through service); Chiba Urban Monorail; Keisei Chiba Line (Keisei Chiba: KS59) | Chūō | Chiba |
↓ Through-running to/from: ↓ Narutō via the ■ Sōbu Main Line; Narita via the ■ Narita Line; Kashima-Jingū via the ■ Narita Line and ■ Kashima Line; Kazusa-Ichinomiya via the ■ Sotobō Line; Kimitsu via the ■ Uchibō Line

== Rolling stock ==
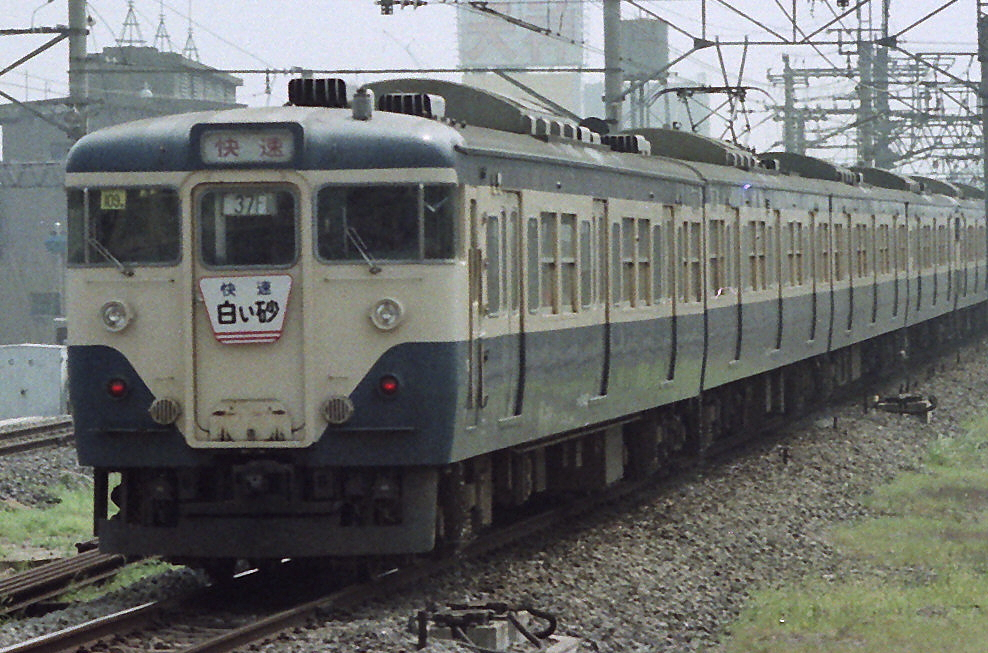
JNR 113 series train at Kinshichō Station in 1978

=== Rapid service ===
- E235-1000 series (from 21 December 2020)

=== Limited express service ===
- E257 series (Shiosai)
- E259 series (Narita Express, Shiosai)

=== Former rolling stock ===
- 113 series (from October 1980 to December 1999)
- E217 series (from December 1994 to March 2025)

== History ==
On 20 August 2016, station numbering was introduced with stations being assigned station numbers between JO19 and JO28. Numbers increase towards in the eastbound direction towards Chiba.
