= E235 series =

Japanese train type

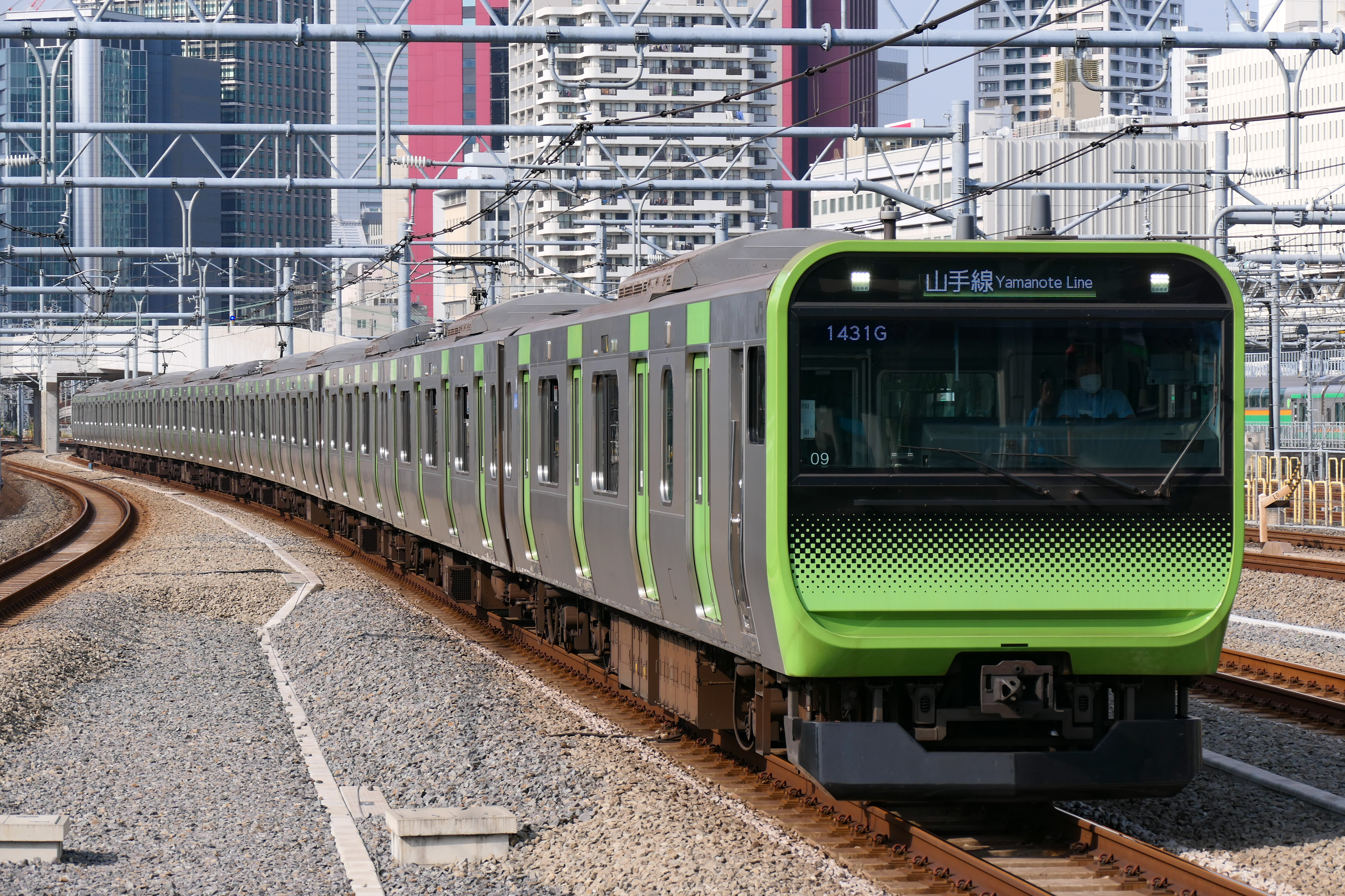
- An E235-0 series train on the Yamanote Line in May 2021
- Stock type: Electric multiple unit
- In service: 2015–present
- Manufacturer: J-TREC
- Built at: Akiha-ku, Niigata; Kanazawa-ku, Yokohama (Green cars)
- Family name: sustina
- Replaced: E231 series (Yamanote and Chūō-Sōbu Lines); E217 series (Sōbu/Yokosuka Lines)
- Constructed: 2015–2025
- Entered service: 30 November 2015
- Number built: 1,265 vehicles (as of December 2024)
- Number in service: 1,265 vehicles (143 sets)
- Formation: 11/4/10 cars per trainset
- Operator: JR East
- Lines served: Yamanote Line; Yokosuka Line / Sōbu Line (Rapid); Test service: Chūō-Sōbu Line

Specifications
- Car body construction: Stainless steel
- Car length: 20 m (65 ft 7 in) (including couplers); 19.57 m (64 ft 2 in) (end cars); 19.5 m (64 ft 0 in) (intermediate cars)
- Width: 2.95 m (9 ft 8 in)
- Height: 3.62 m (11 ft 11 in)
- Floor height: 1.13 m (3 ft 8 in)
- Doors: 4 pairs per side; 2 doors per side (Green cars)
- Maximum speed: 120 km/h (75 mph)
- Traction system: Mitsubishi 2-level SiC–VVVF (Note: Toshiba for MoHa E234-2, E235-3, and E234-4.)
- Traction motors: MT79 totally enclosed fan cooled 3-phase AC induction motor
- Transmission: 7.07:1 (99:14) gear ratio
- Acceleration: 3.0 km/(h⋅s) (1.9 mph/s)
- Deceleration: 4.2 km/(h⋅s) (2.6 mph/s)
- Electric systems: Overhead line, 1,500 V DC
- Current collection: Pantograph
- Bogies: DT80, TR255, TR264
- Safety systems: ATS-P, D-ATC
- Track gauge: 1,067 mm (3 ft 6 in)

The E235 series (E235系, E235-kei) is a DC electric multiple unit (EMU) commuter and suburban train type operated by East Japan Railway Company (JR East). The commuter variant was introduced on Yamanote Line services in November 2015, and the suburban variant entered service on the Sōbu Rapid and Yokosuka Lines on 21 December 2020.

== Design features ==
The E235 series design was developed from the earlier E233 series trains, and like the E233 and E231 series trains, the new E235 series trains have stainless steel bodies. The exterior styling was overseen by the industrial design firm Ken Okuyama Design. Baggage racks and hand-holds have been lowered 5 cm (1.97 in) for easier access and the seats are 1 cm (0.39 in) wider than previous trains. The car interiors also have up to 36 digital monitors for various informational displays. The window behind the drivers cab has been lowered so children can get a better view of the operator of the cars. The temperature of each car is also monitored; the system can predict the number of passengers at upcoming stations and adjust the temperature for passenger comfort. This information is also communicated to a smart phone application, allowing customers to choose in which car to ride based on their temperature preference. In 2017, the E235 series received the Laurel Prize.

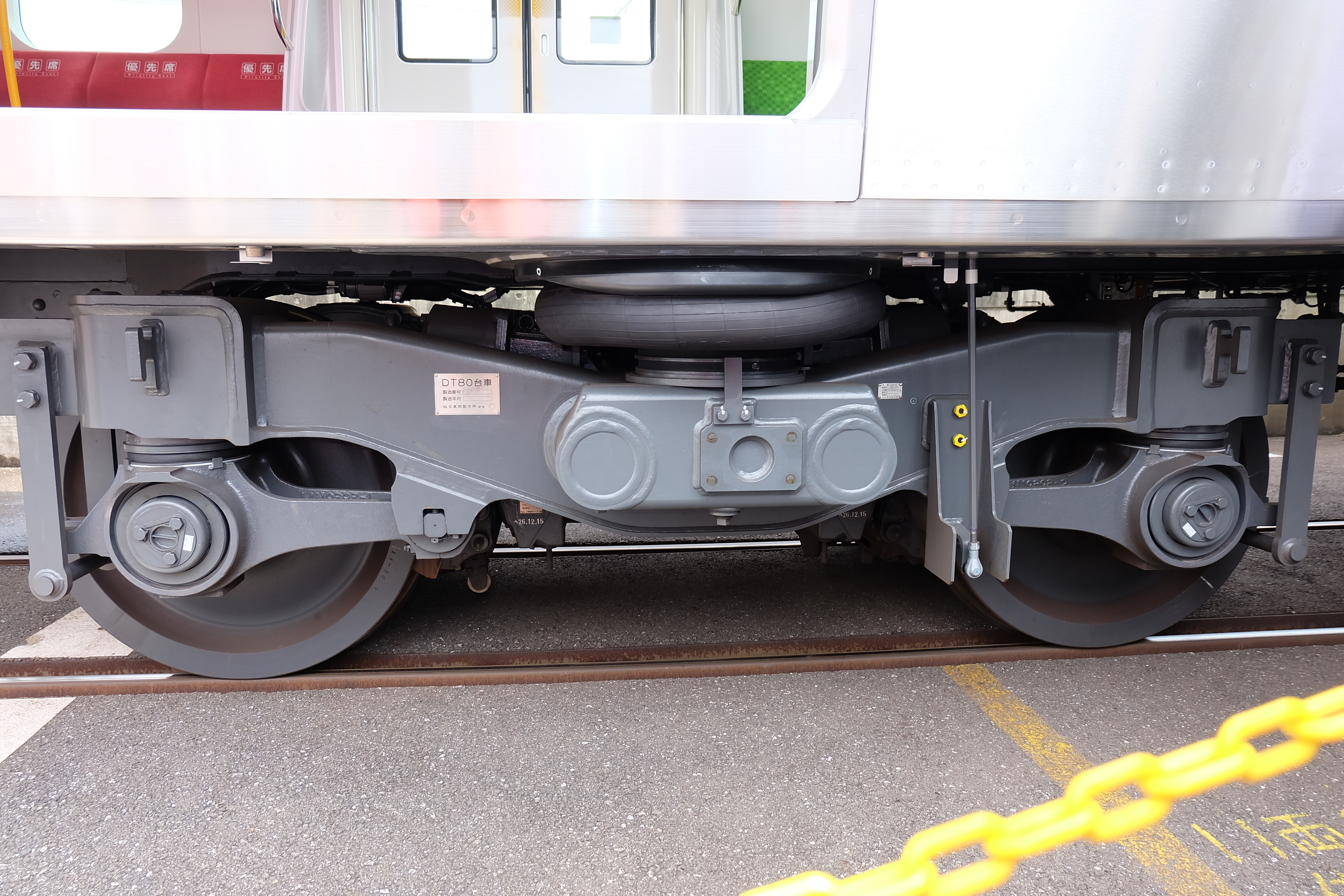
A DT80 motor bogie

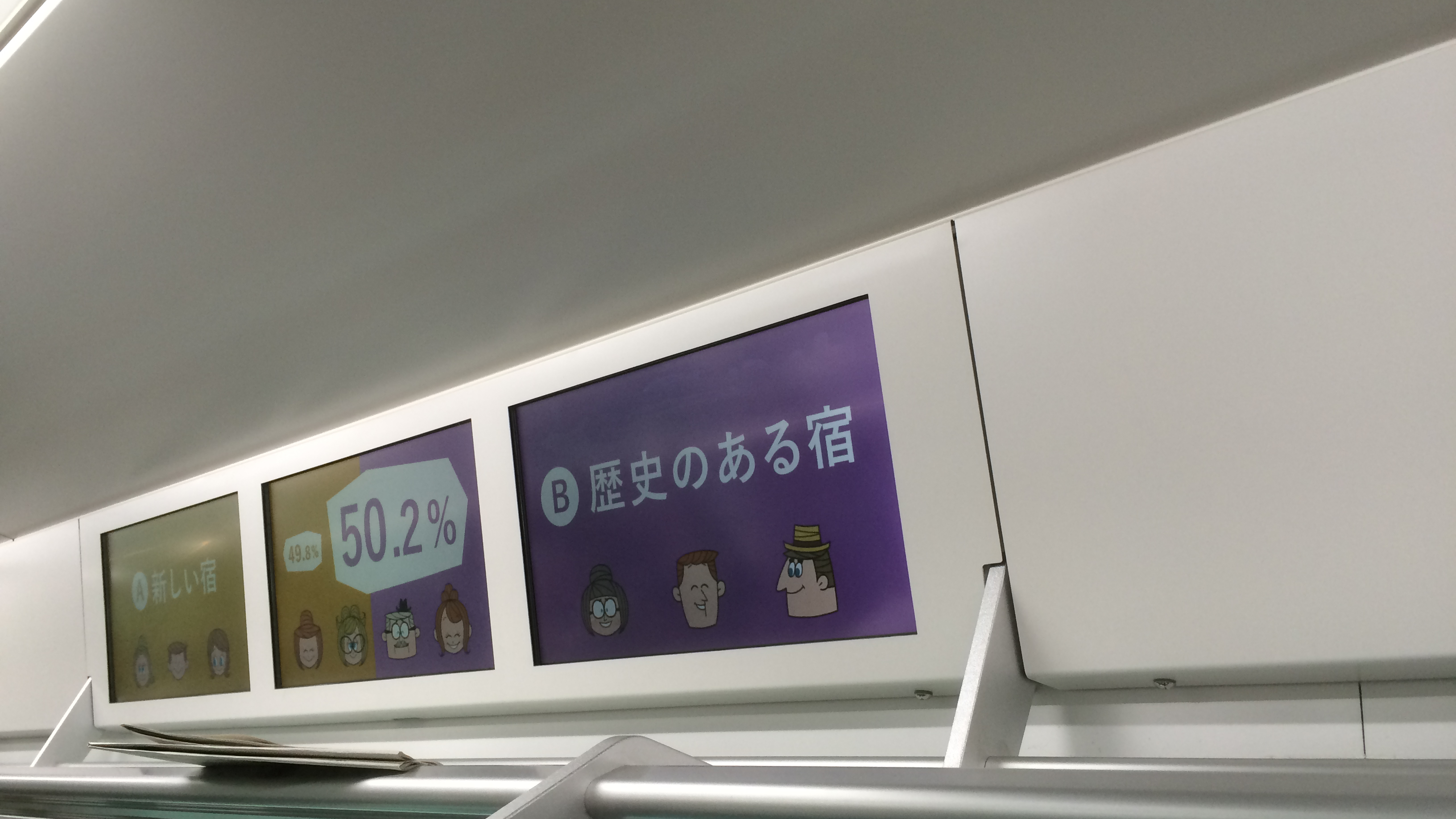
LCD advertising screens

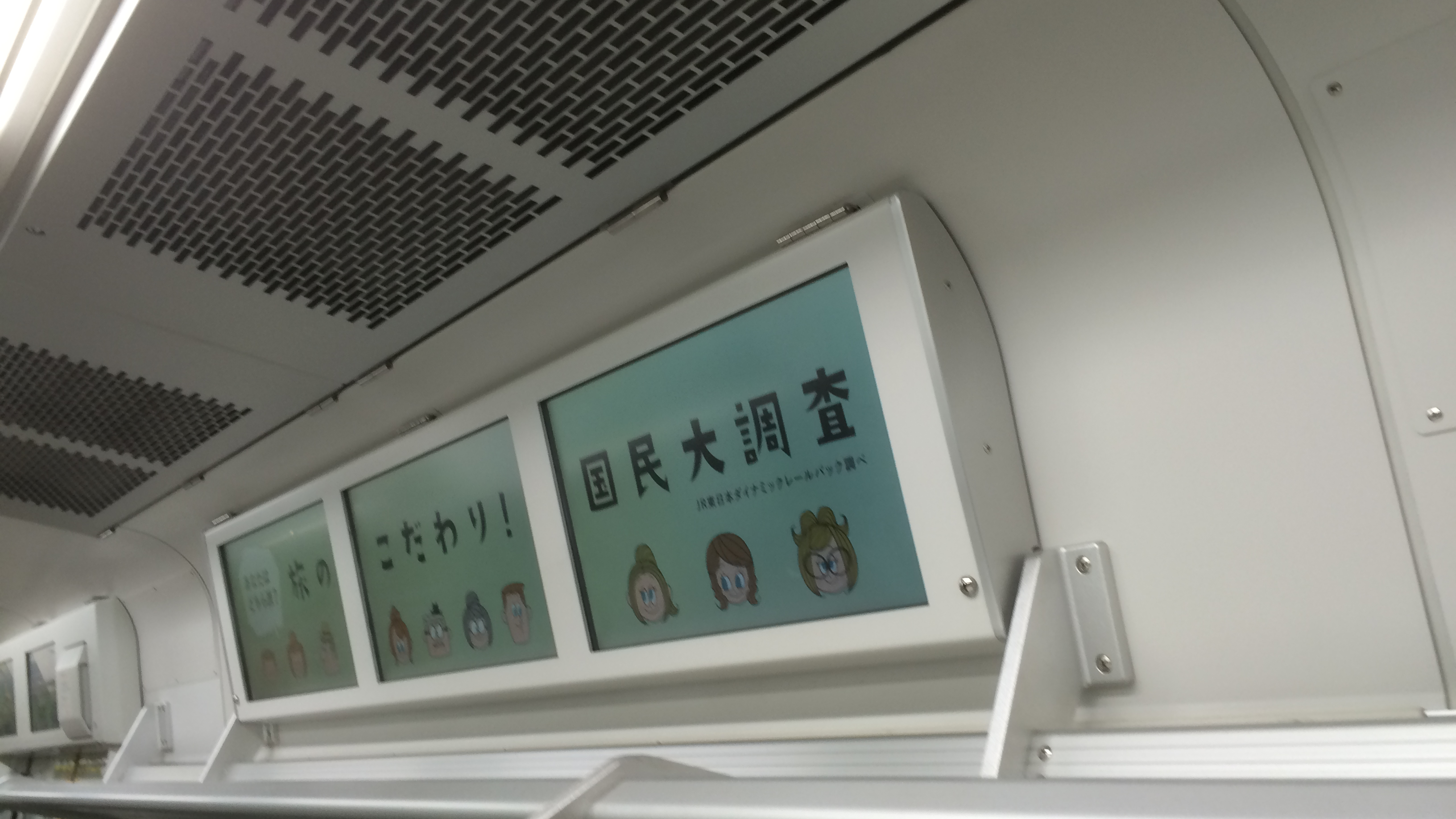
LCD advertising screens inside a SaHa E235-4600 series car

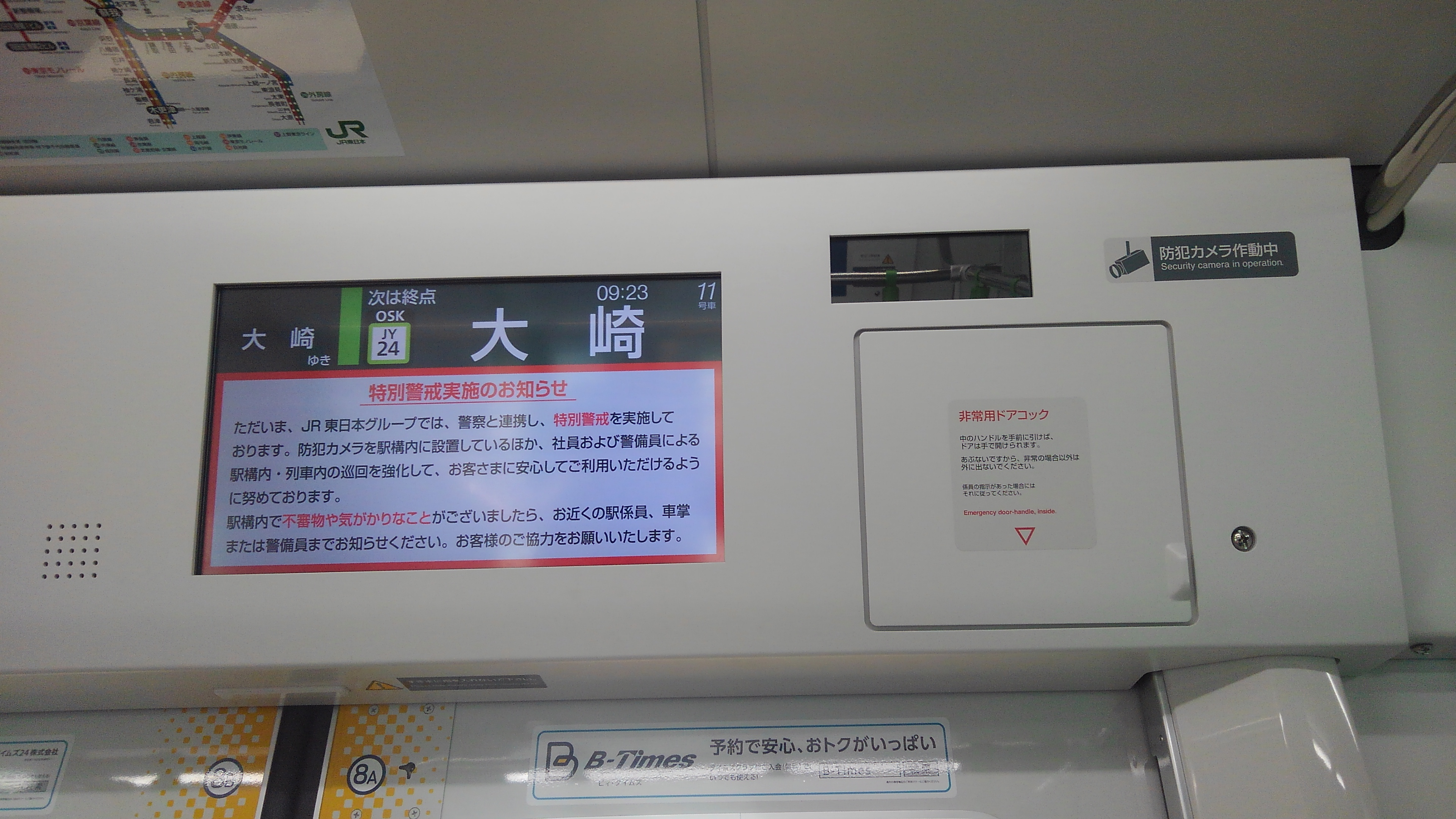
Security camera in an E235 series car

== Variants ==
- / E235-0 series: 11-car sets used on the Yamanote Line and 10-car sets used on the Chūō-Sōbu Line
- E235-1000 series: 11+4-car sets used on Yokosuka Line and Sōbu Rapid Line, with through services to the Narita Line, Sotobō Line, Uchibō Line, Kashima Line, and Sōbu Main Line

== History ==
Details of the E235 series design were first announced in July 2014. The first, pre-series set 01, train was delivered from the J-TREC factory at Akiha-ku, Niigata in March 2015, with test-running commencing on the Yamanote Line on 30 March.

Set number 01 entered revenue service on 30 November 2015, with a departure ceremony at Osaki Station, but was taken out of service later the same day following faults with door-close indicators and problems stopping at the correct position along the station platform. Test running on the Yamanote Line resumed from 27 December. The train returned to revenue service on the Yamanote Line on 7 March 2016.

In June 2016, JR East announced its official plans for the introduction of a fleet of 49 full-production sets (539 vehicles) between spring 2017 and spring 2020. Most units would be built as 10-car sets and use converted former E231-500 series SaHa E231-4600 cars, while two units would be built as 11-car sets. The first full-production standard set, 02, was delivered from the J-TREC factory in Niigata in April 2017. This entered service on 22 May 2017.

In April 2018, JR East announced the replacement of the existing E217 series on the Sōbu Line (Rapid) and Yokosuka Line by new E235 series trains beginning in fiscal 2020. The fleet will consist of 51 11-car trains and 46 four-car trains, for a total of 745 cars to be newly constructed. The first train entered service on 21 December 2020.

== E235-0 series ==
E235-0 series
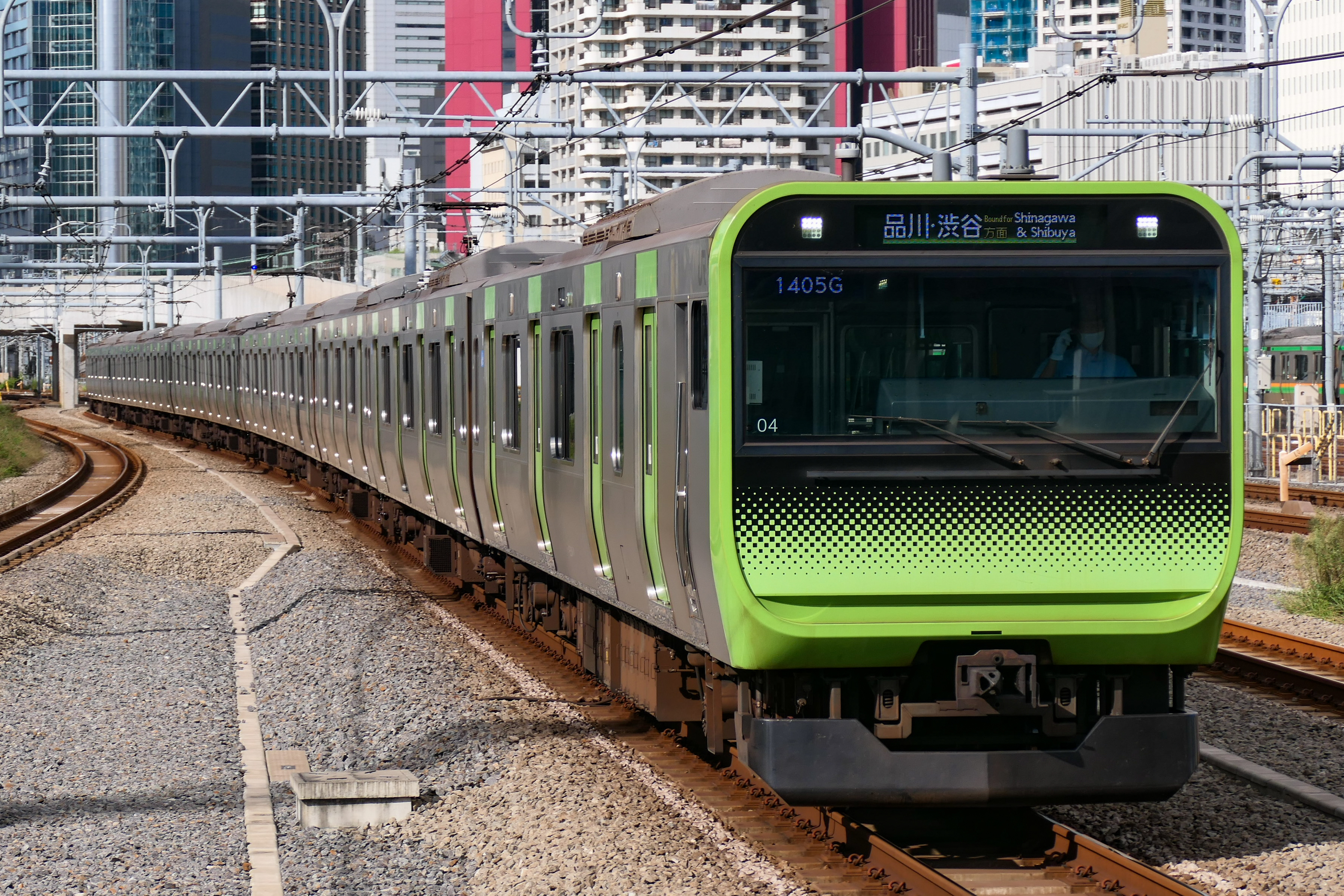
- Yamanote Line 11-car E235-0 series set 04 in August 2022
- In service: 2015–present
- Built at: Akiha-ku, Niigata
- Replaced: E231 series
- Constructed: 2015–2019 (Note: Including 48 SaHa E235-4600 series cars originally constructed in 2010–2011 as SaHa E231-4600 series)
- Entered service: 30 November 2015
- Number built: 550 vehicles (50 sets)
- Number in service: 550 vehicles (50 sets)
- Formation: 11 cars per Yamanote Line set; 10 cars per Chūō-Sōbu Line set
- Fleet numbers: 01–50; B31, B33
- Capacity: 1,628 passengers
- Depots: Tokyo; Future: Mitaka
- Lines served: Yamanote Line; Test service: Chūō-Sōbu Line

Specifications
- Train length: 220 m (721 ft 9 in) (including couplers)
- Doors: 4 pairs per side
- Traction system: Toshiba SC105 hybrid SiC-IGBT–VVVF (MoHa E234-2, E235-3, E234-3); Mitsubishi Electric SC104 SiC-MOSFET–VVVF (all other MoHa cars)
- UIC classification: 2′2′+2′2′+Bo′Bo′+Bo′Bo′+2′2′+Bo′Bo′+Bo′Bo′+2′2′+Bo′Bo′+Bo′Bo′+2′2′

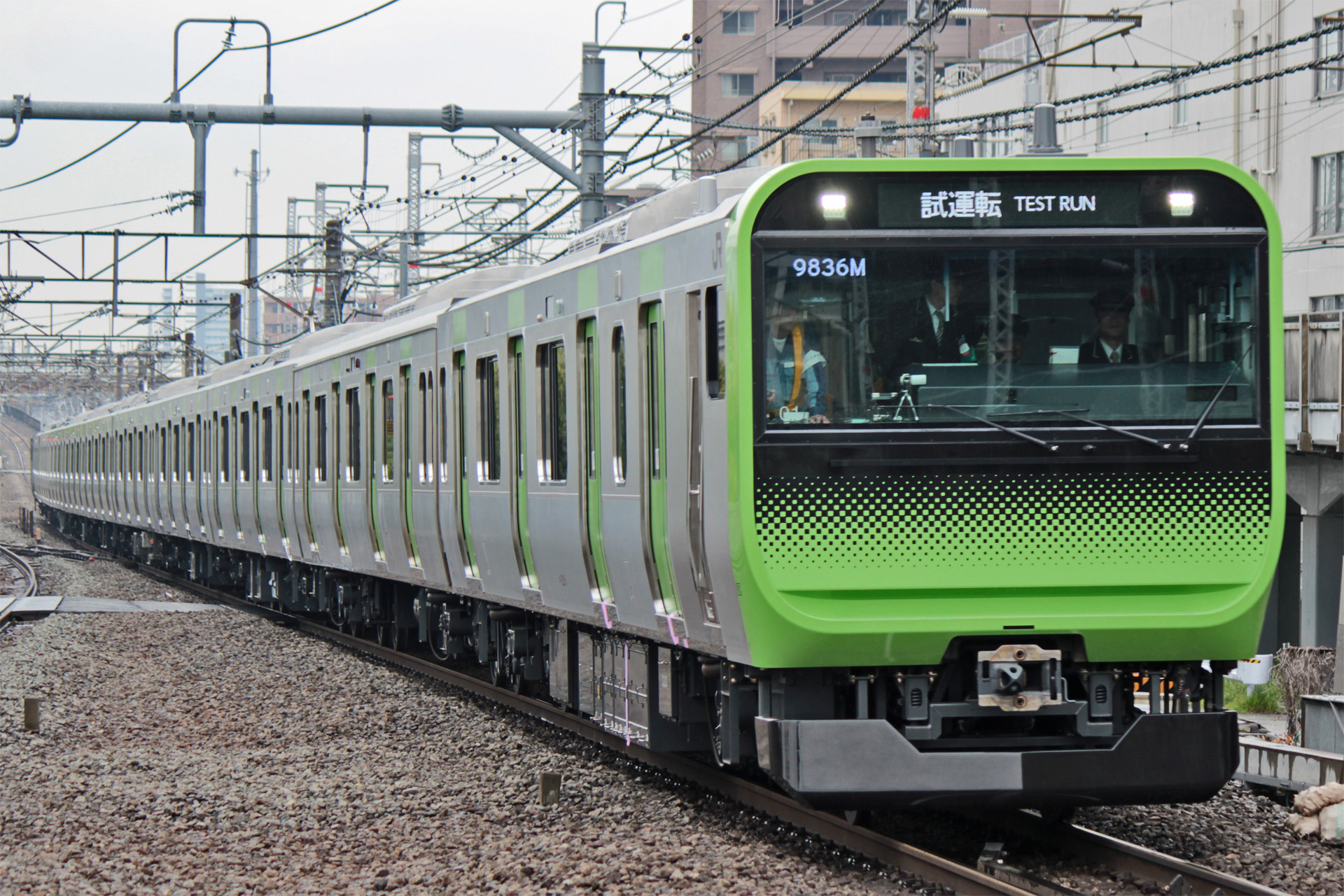
The pre-series set, 01, on a test run in April 2015

A total of 50 11-car trains were delivered for use on the Yamanote Line, letting the E231-500 series in use since 2002 being transferred to the Chūō–Sōbu Line. A pre-series train was delivered in March 2015, first entering revenue service from 30 November 2015, but then taken out of service for three months before re-entering service in March 2016.

The pre-series set (01) was converted to the full production standard by 14 March 2018.

=== Formations ===
As of 17 December 2019, fifty 11-car sets (01–50) are based at Tokyo General Rolling Stock Centre and formed with six motored ("M") cars and five non-powered trailer ("T") cars. All sets except sets 04 and 05 have SaHa E235-4600 cars (Car 10), which are modified from former E231-500 series SaHa E231-4600 cars.

	← Counterclockwise (Inner loop) Clockwise (Outer loop) →										
Car No.	11	10	9	8	7	6	5	4	3	2	1
Designation	Tc	T	M1	M2	T'	M1	M2	T	M1	M2	Tc'
Numbering (Sets 01–03, 06–50)	KuHa E235	SaHa E235-4600	MoHa E235	MoHa E234	SaHa E234	MoHa E235	MoHa E234	SaHa E235	MoHa E235	MoHa E234	KuHa E234
Numbering (Sets 04–05)	KuHa E235	SaHa E235-500	MoHa E235	MoHa E234	SaHa E234	MoHa E235	MoHa E234	SaHa E235	MoHa E235	MoHa E234	KuHa E234
Capacity (total/seated)	142/39	160/48	160/51	160/51	160/51	160/51	160/51	160/51	160/51	160/51	142/39

- On the pre-series set (01), car 3 has one PS33D single-arm pantograph, car 6 has PS33H and PS36A single-arm pantographs (one used as a backup), and car 9 has one PS33H single-arm pantograph.
- On the remaining production sets (02–50), cars 3 and 9 each have one PS33H single-arm pantograph and car 6 has two PS33H single-arm pantographs (one used as a backup).
- All cars have an accessible/priority "free space".
- Car 4 is designated as a mildly air-conditioned car.

=== Exterior ===
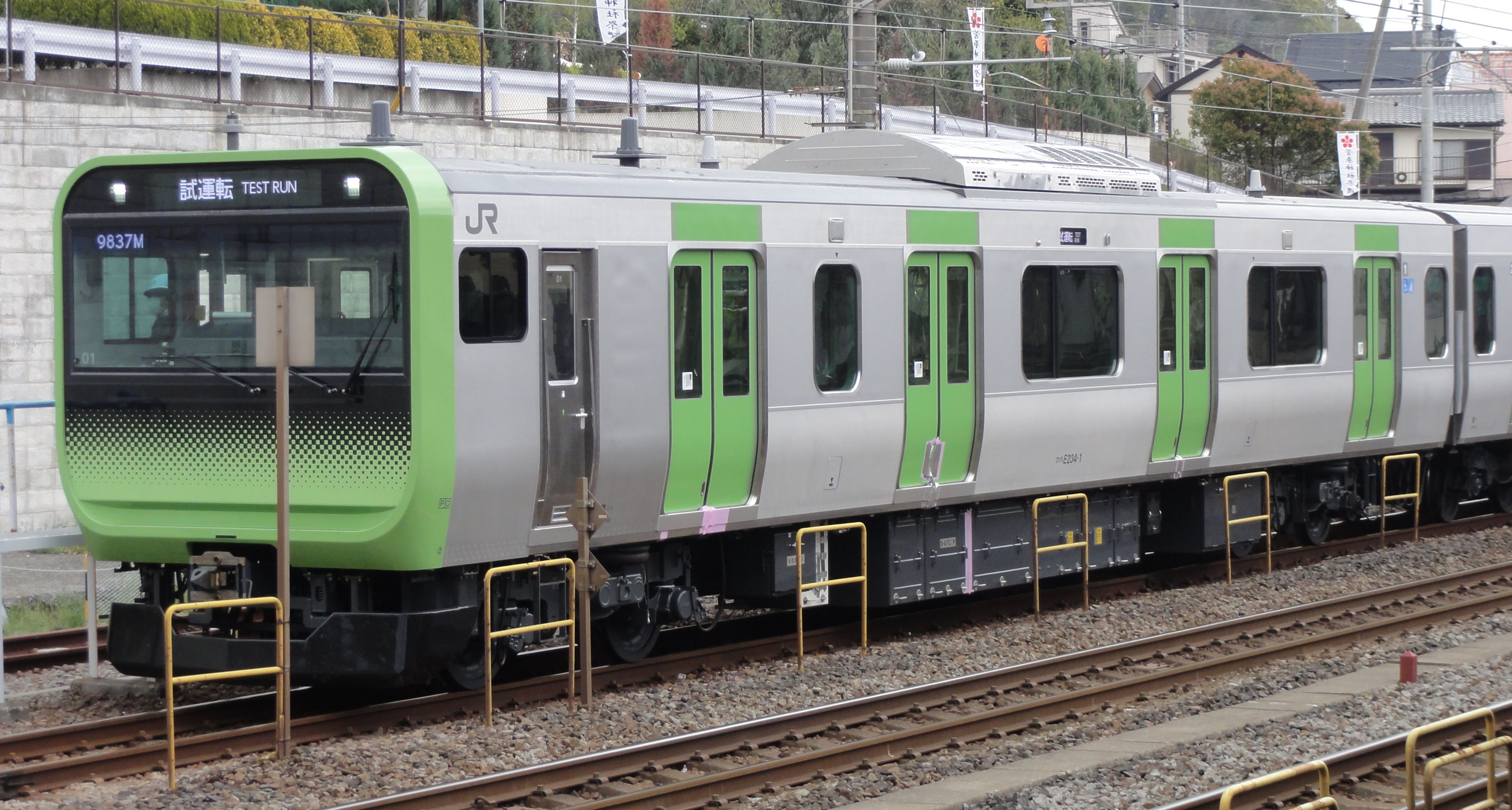
KuHa E234-1 (Car 1)

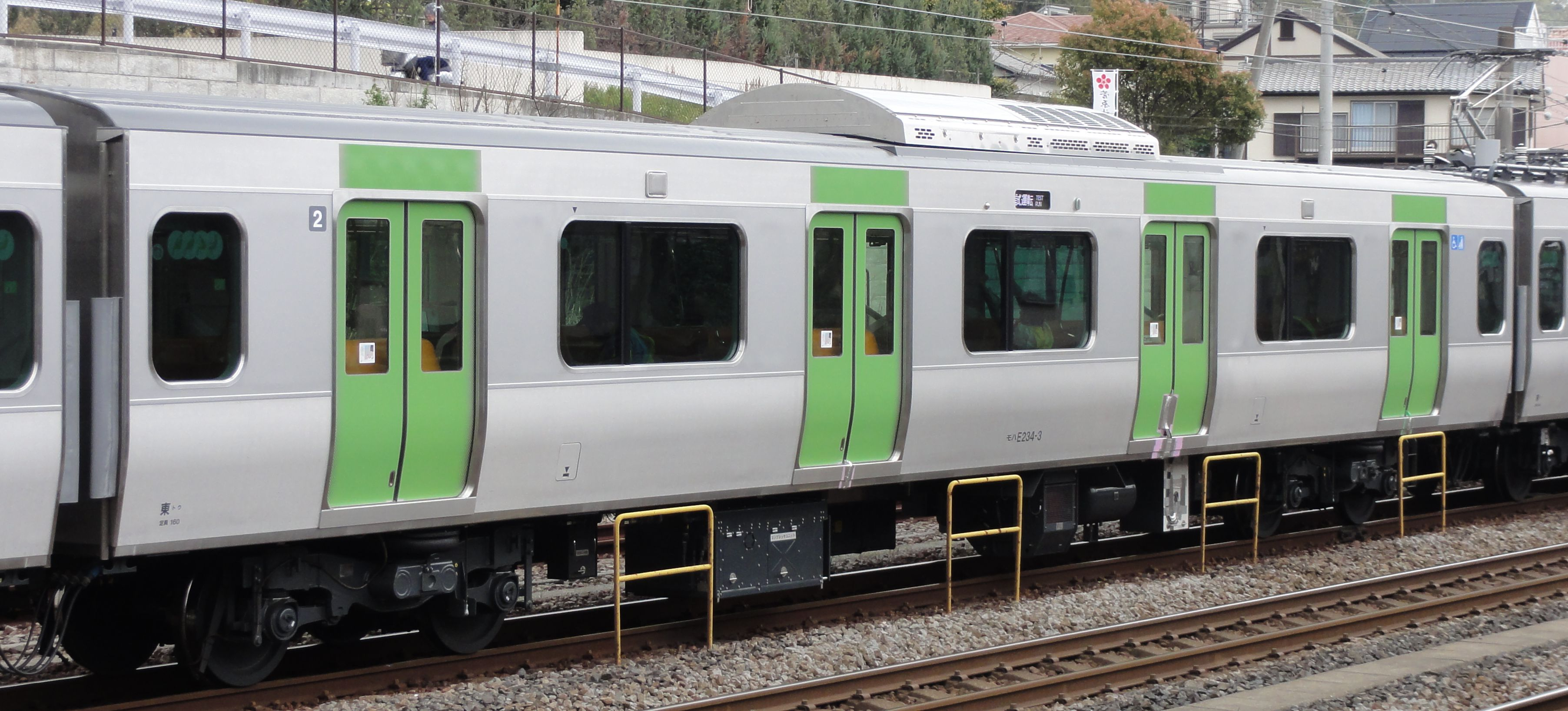
MoHa E234-3 (Car 2)

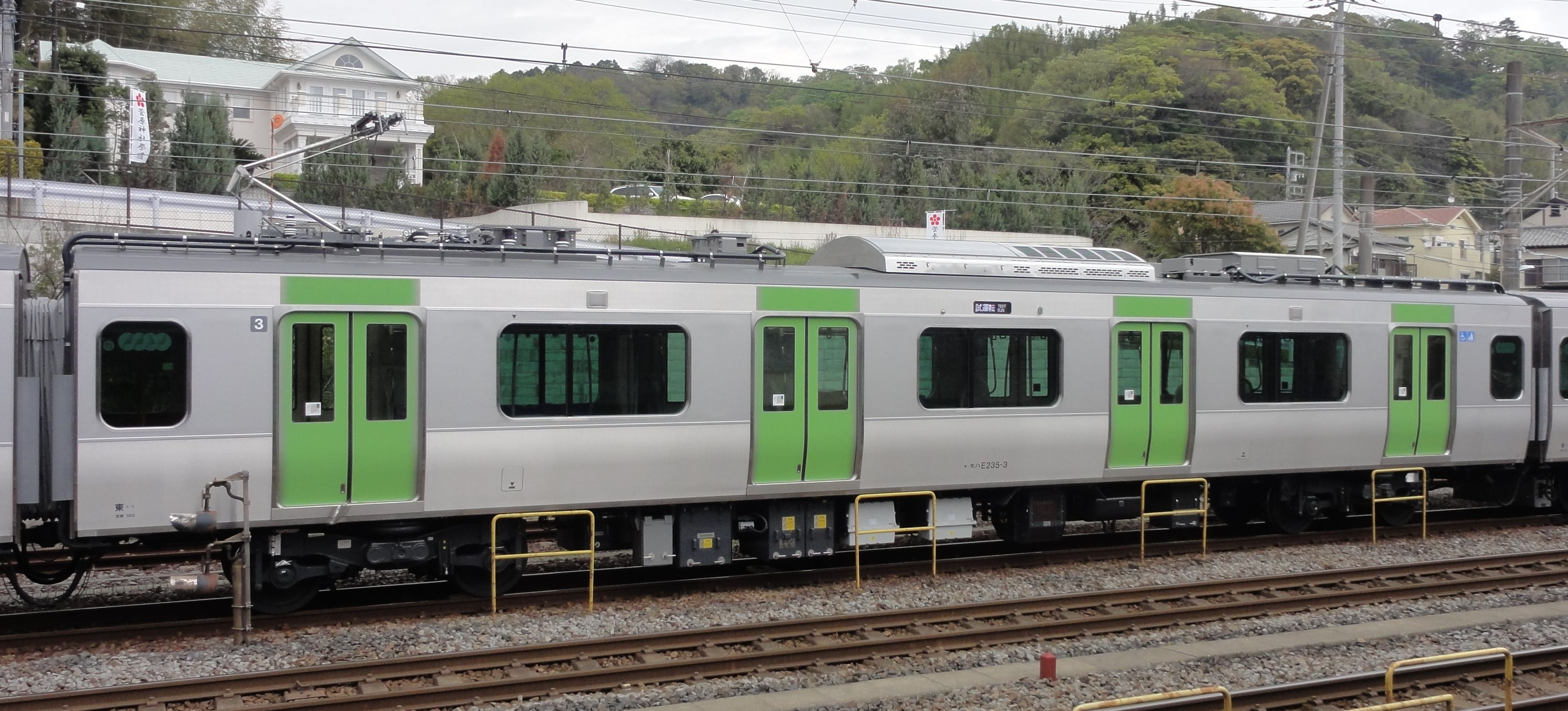
MoHa E235-3 (Car 3)

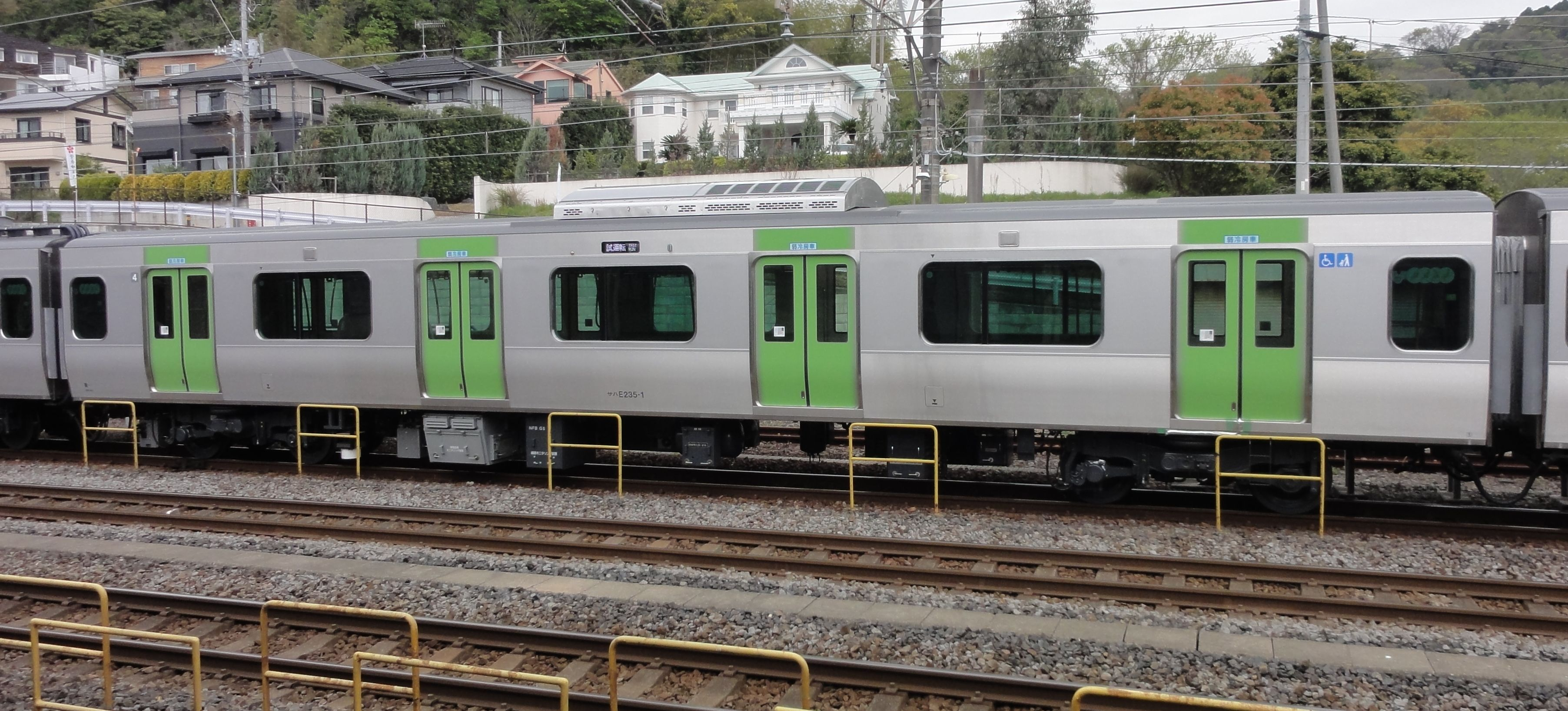
SaHa E235-1 (Car 4)

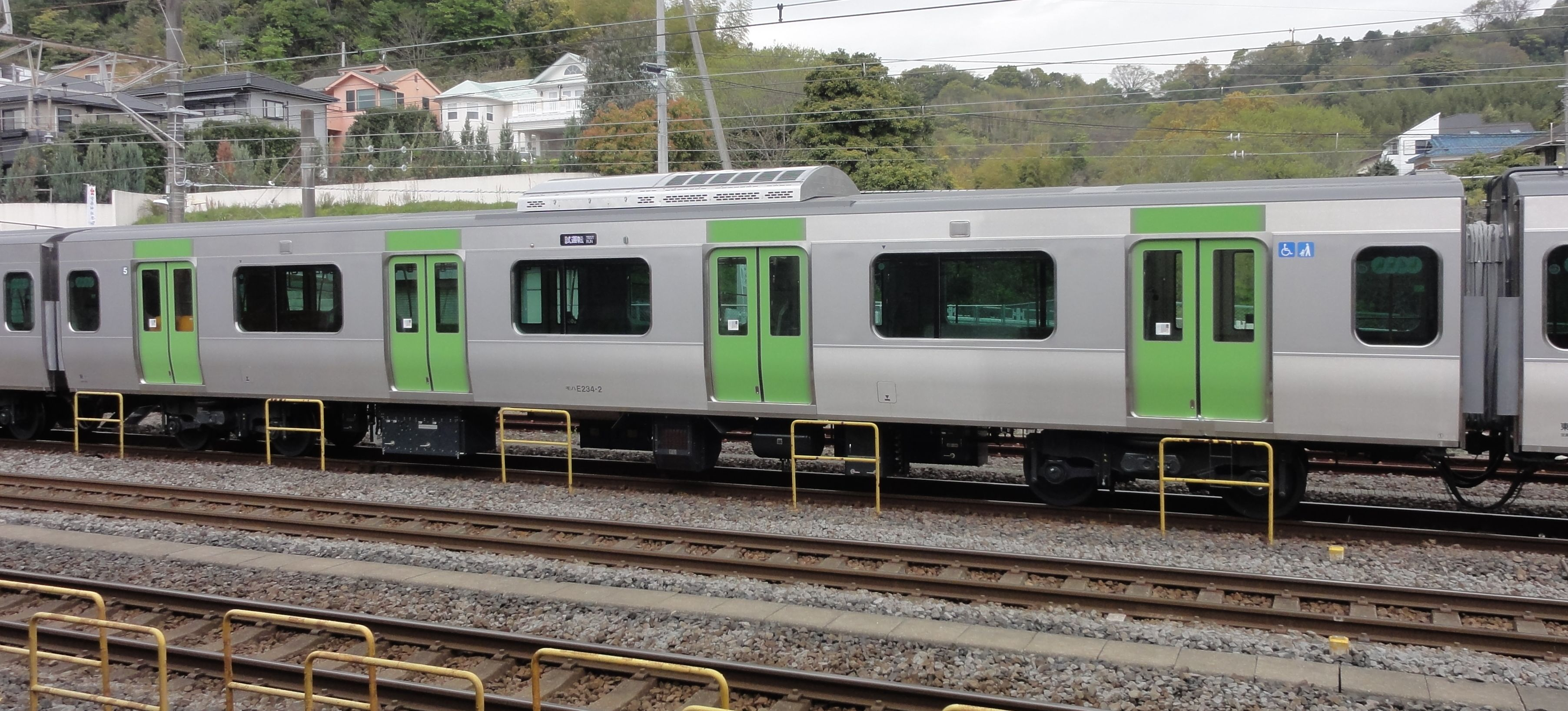
MoHa E234-2 (Car 5)

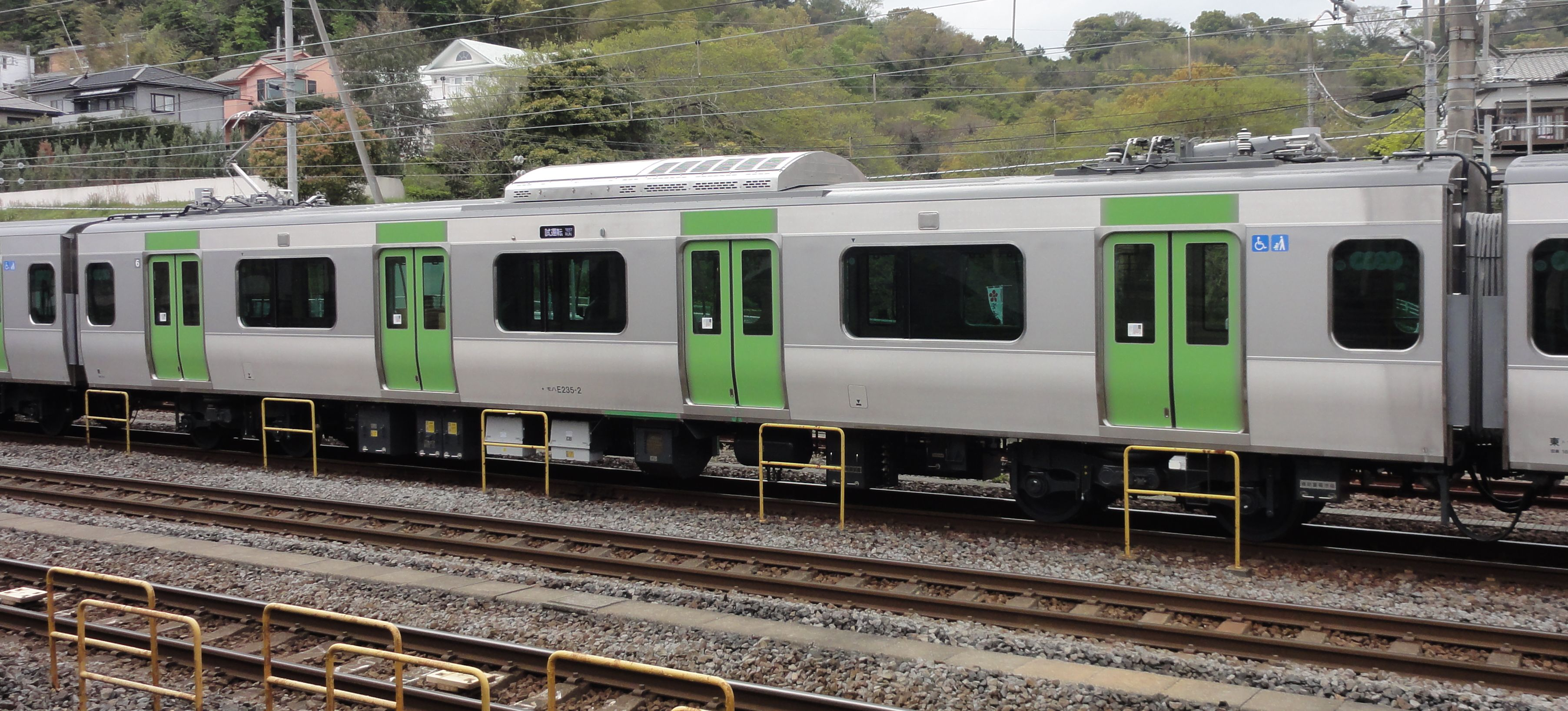
MoHa E235-2 (Car 6)

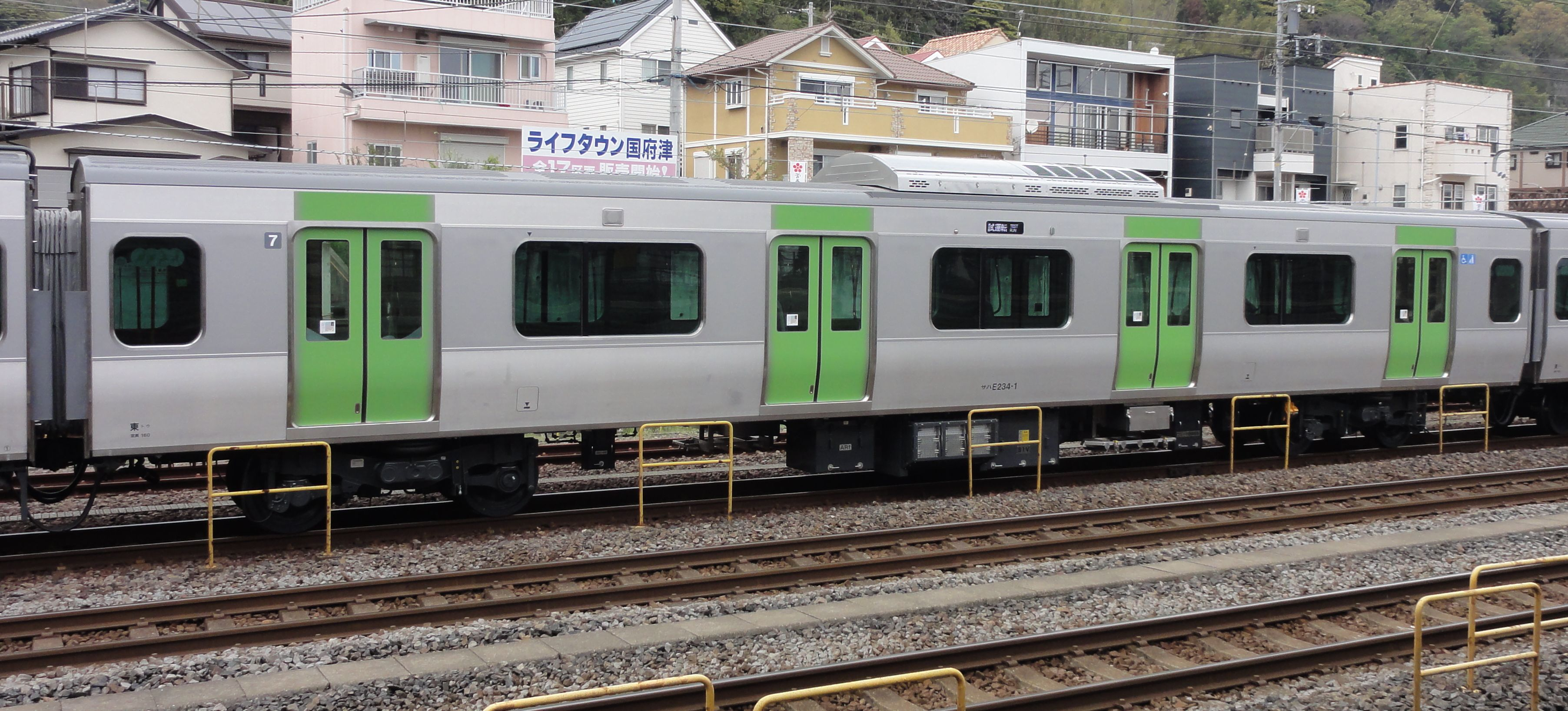
SaHa E234-1 (Car 7)

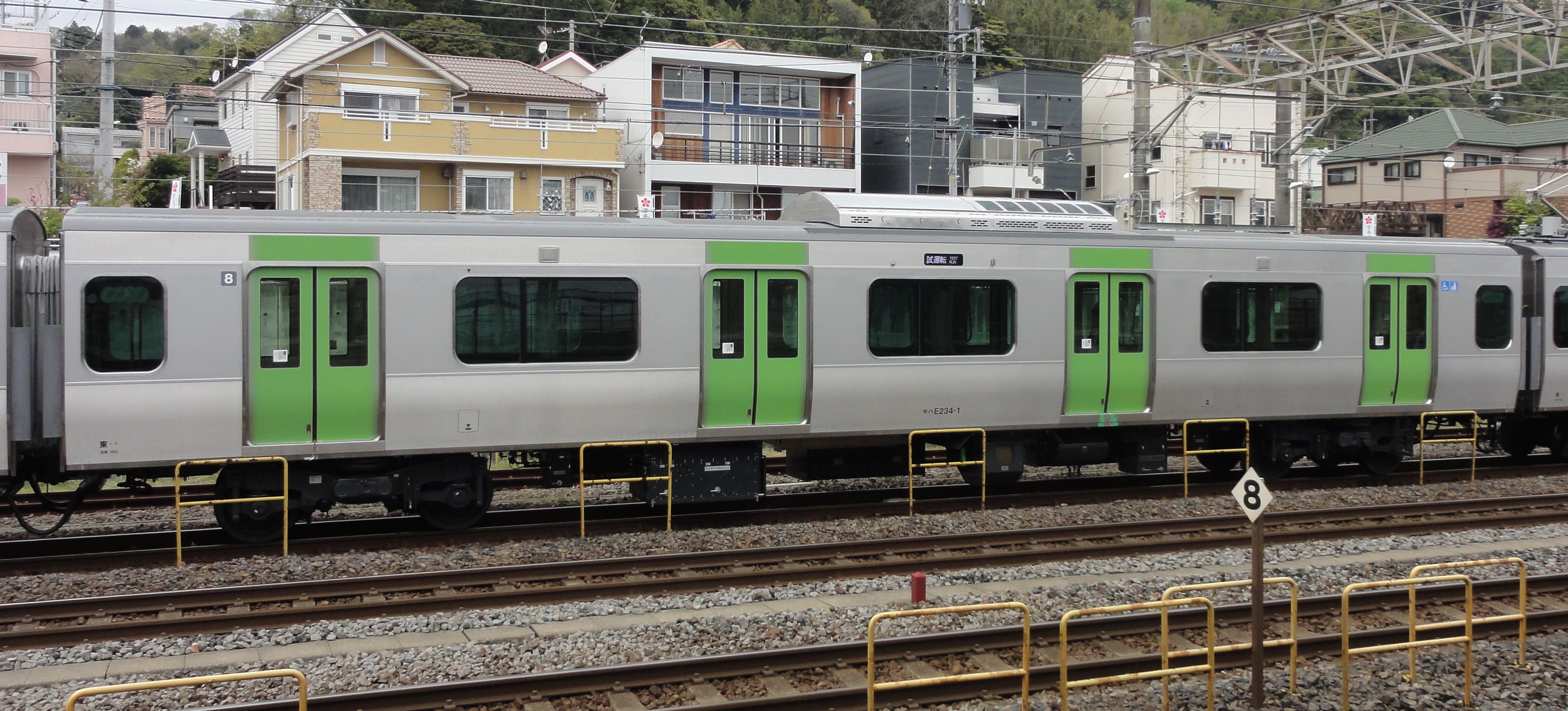
MoHa E234-1 (Car 8)

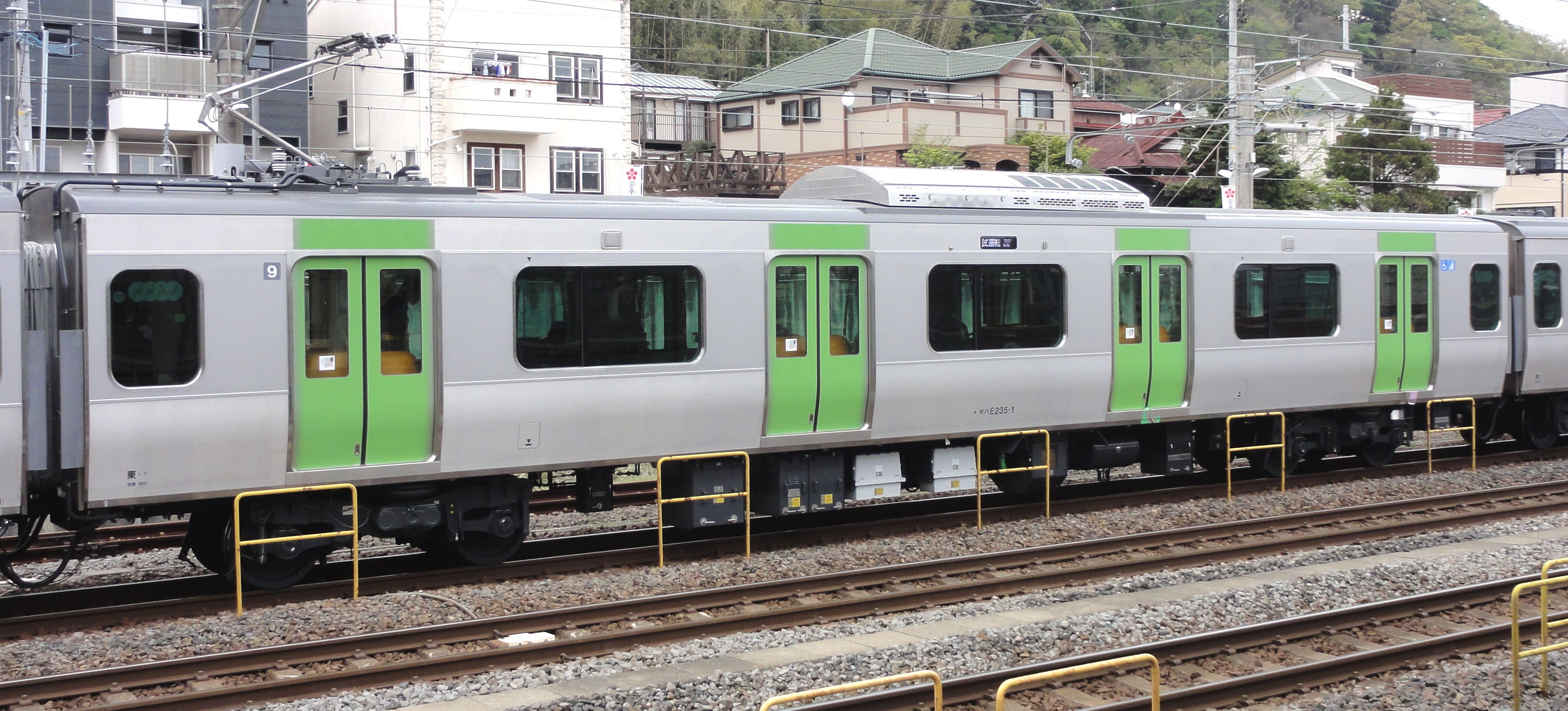
MoHa E235-1 (Car 9)

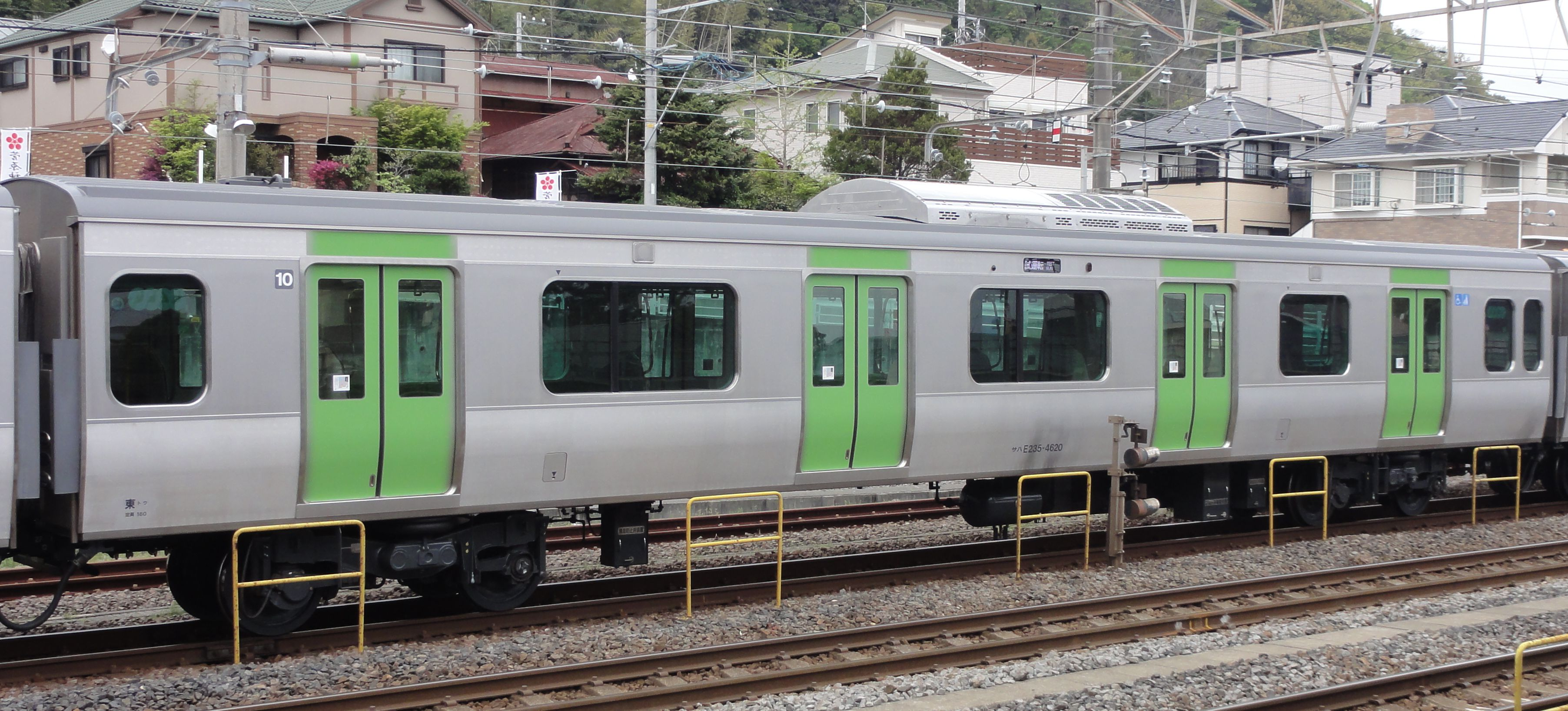
SaHa E235-4620 (Car 10)

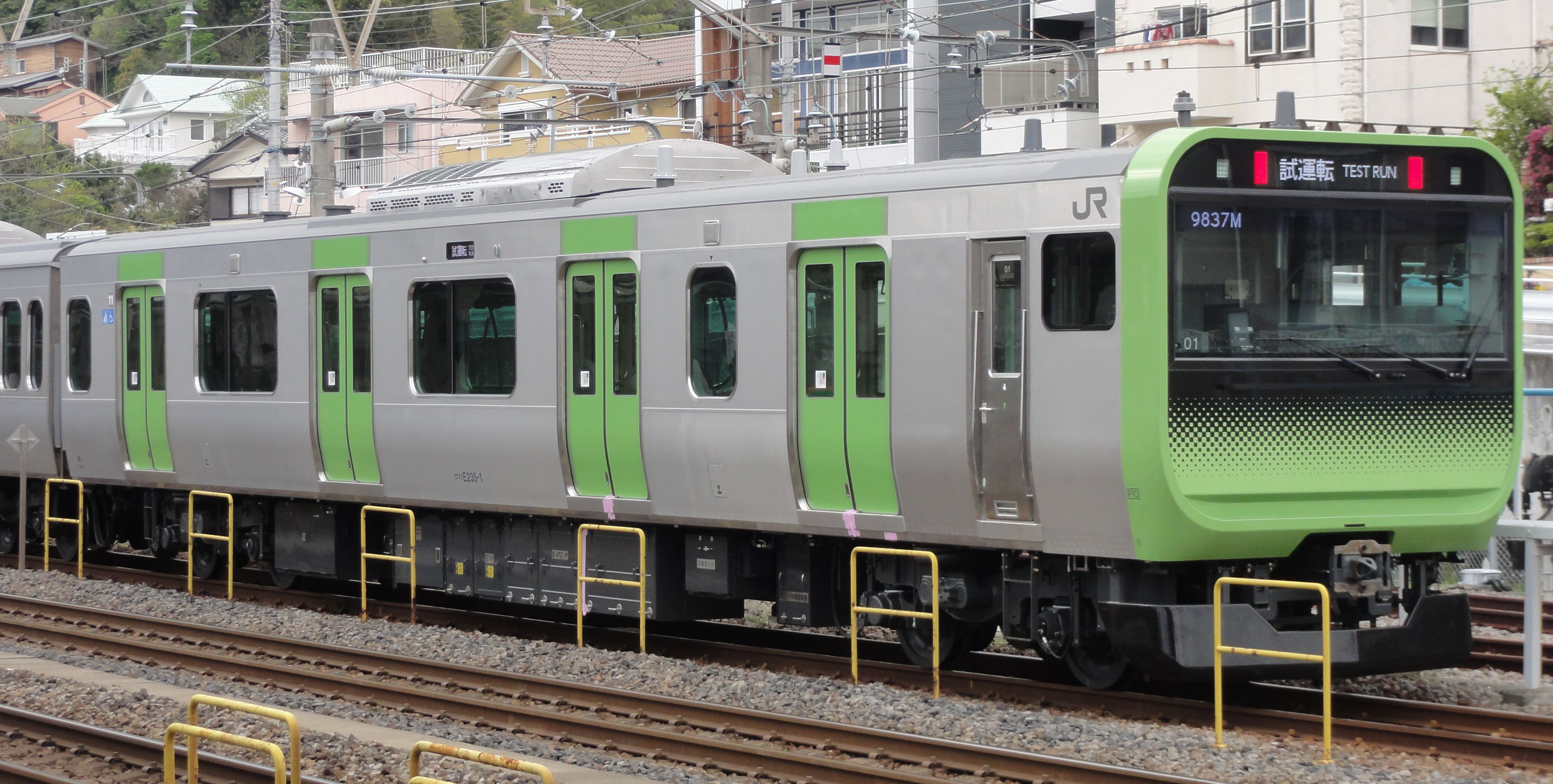
KuHa E235-1 (Car 11)

=== Interior ===
Passenger accommodation consists of longitudinal bench seating throughout, with an individual seat width of 460 mm (18.1 in) per person, compared to 450 mm (17.7 in) for the earlier E231-500 series. Priority seating is provided at both ends of each car (except in end cars), and a space for wheelchairs or strollers is provided at one end of each car. LED lighting is used throughout. The initial plan was for paper advertisements inside the cars to be completely abolished, replaced by 18 LCD colour advertising screens in each car, but following feedback from advertising companies and users, the first train to enter service will include traditional paper advertisements in addition to the LCD screens.

The full-production sets (02 onward) incorporate a number of design changes. Whereas in the pre-series set 01, the luggage rack height was generally 1,678 mm (5 ft 6.1 in) with a height of 1,628 mm (5 ft 4.1 in) in the end cars and in priority seating areas, this is standardized as 1,628 mm (5 ft 4.1 in) throughout from set 02 onward. The handrails next to seats in the full-production sets have an embossed surface compared with the polished metal surface used in the pre-series set.

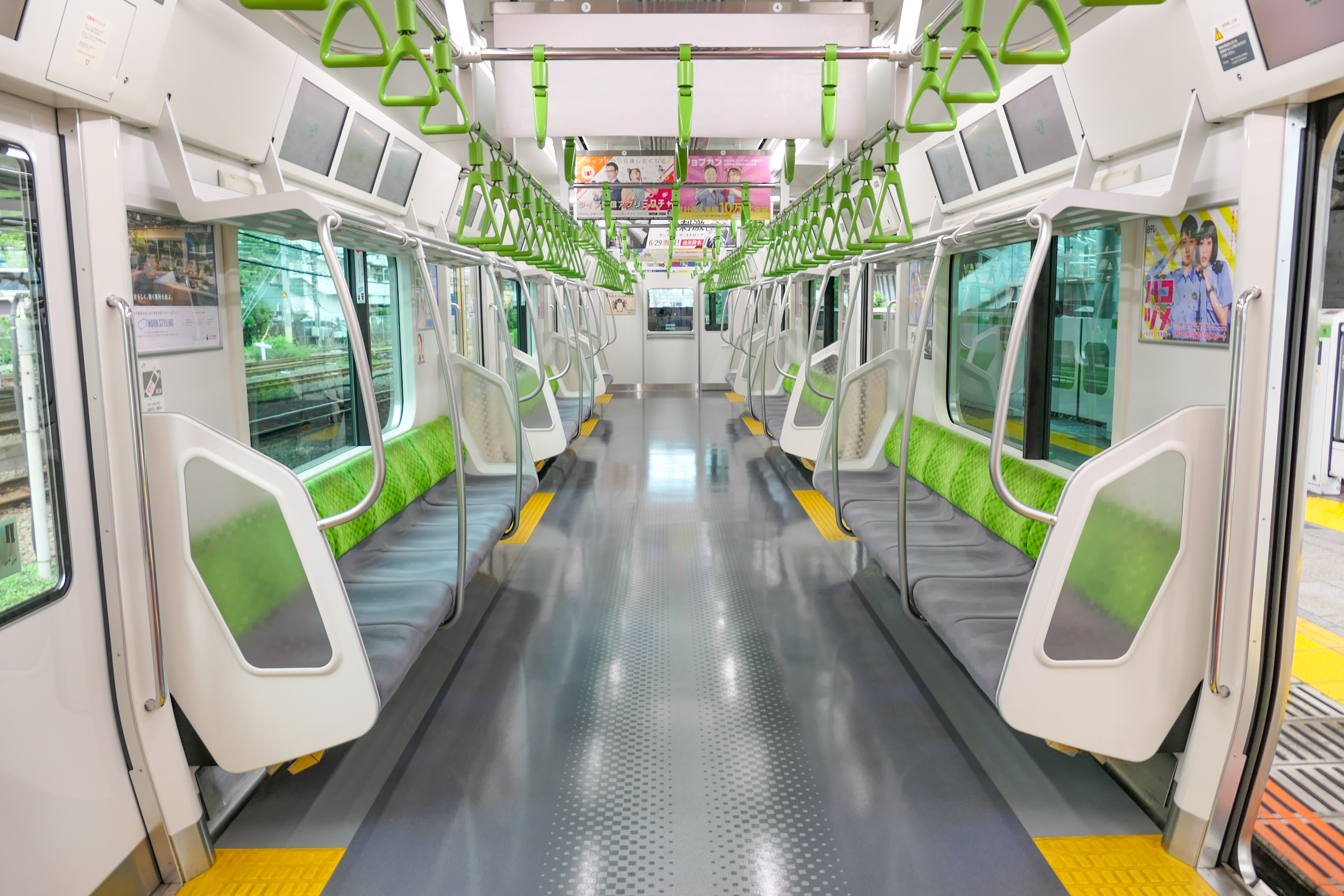
Interior (full production)

Interior (SaHa E235-4600)

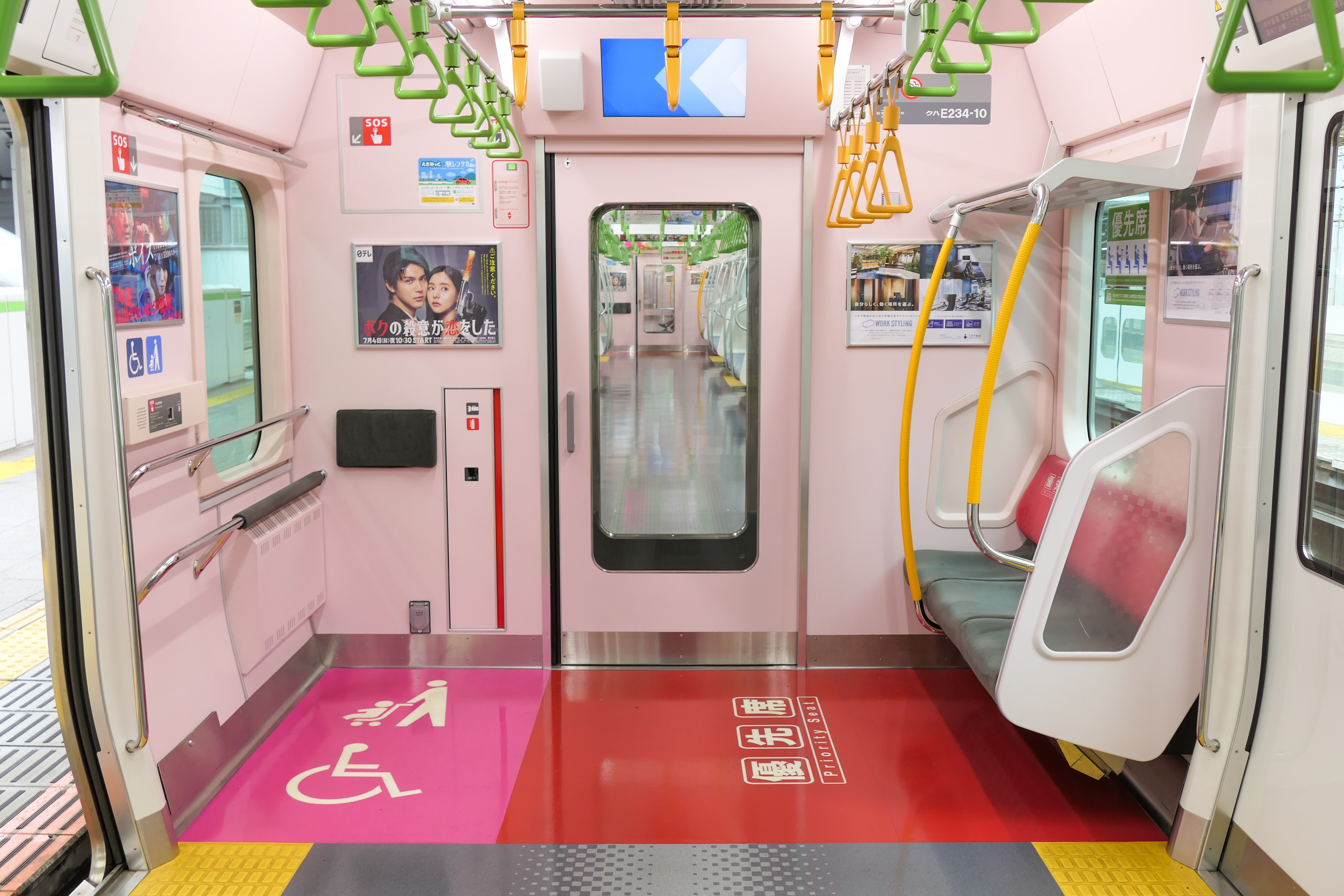
Priority seating and free space

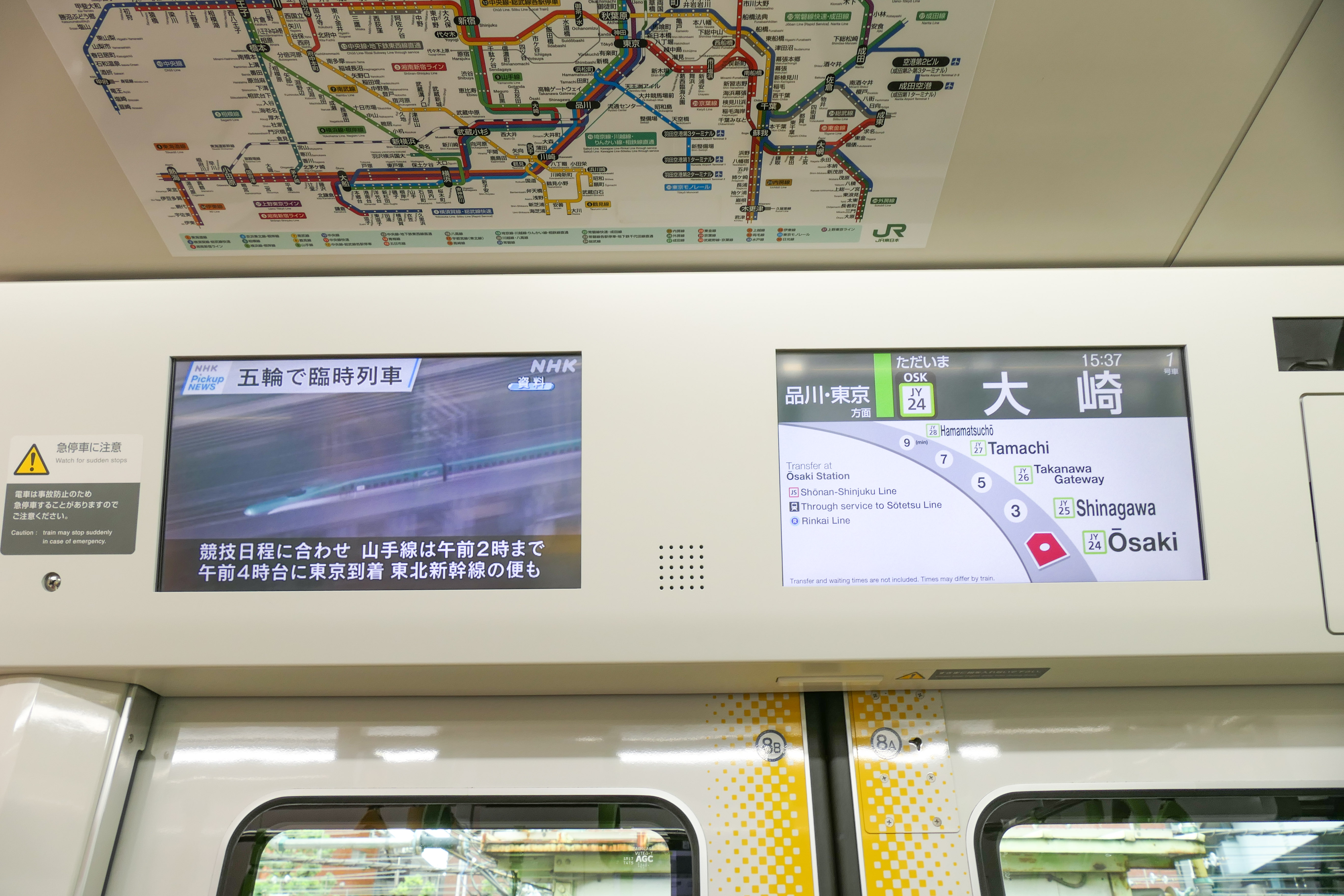
Passenger information screen

=== SaHa E235-500/-4600 series cars ===
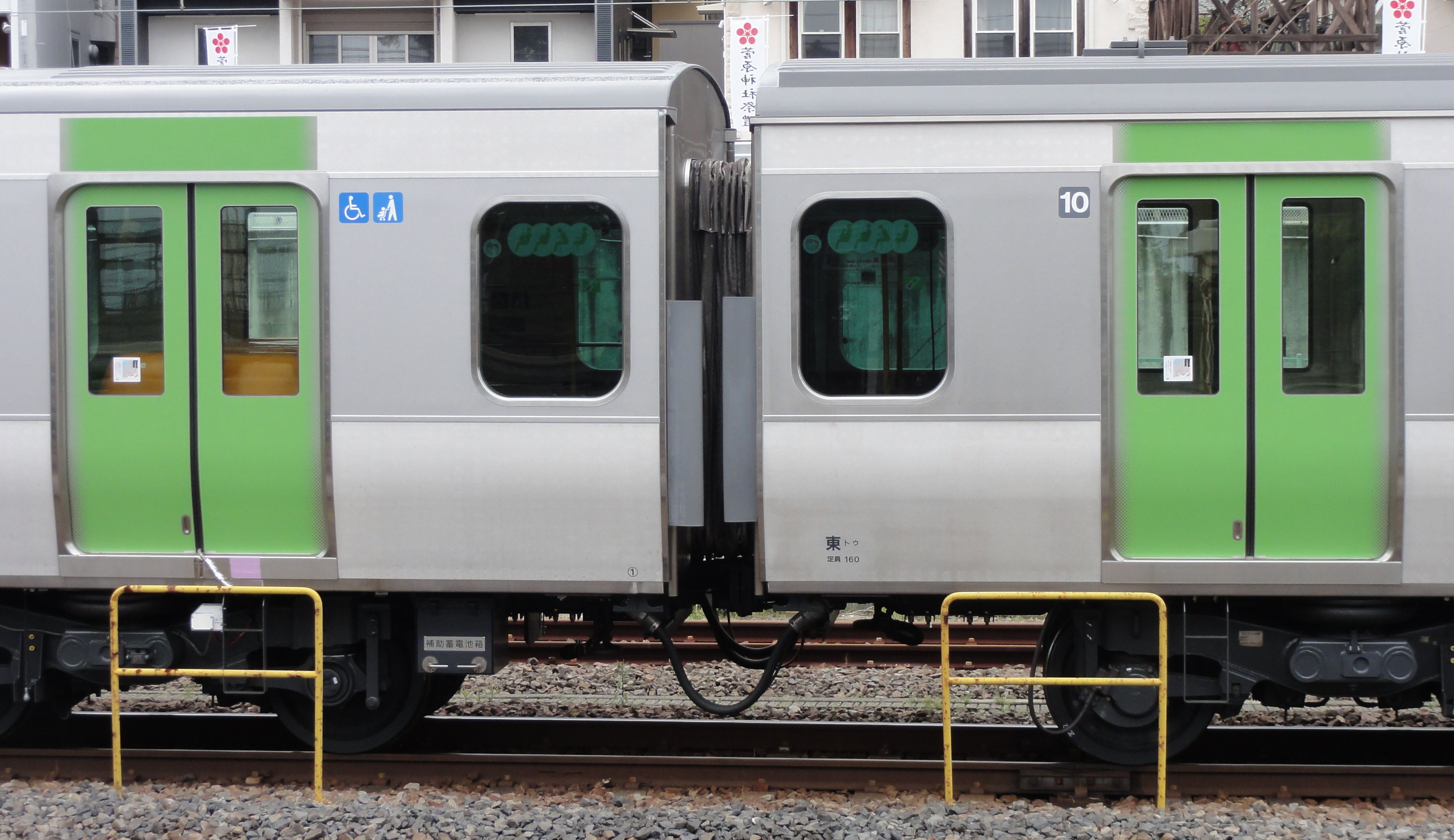
The car on the right is a SaHa E235-4600 series car, modified from a SaHa E231-4600 series car. Its rain gutter uses the older design and protrudes from the side of the car, unlike that of the car on the left.

The tenth car in E235-0 series trainsets has a slightly different door spacing to align more closely with the driver's cab of the ten-car Keihin–Tōhoku Line trains, which sometimes share platforms with Yamanote Line trains. In 48 of the 50 trainsets, the tenth car is a SaHa E235-4600 series car, which has several external differences from the other cars. These cars were originally built between 2010 and 2011 as SaHa E231-4600 series cars to E233 series standards. They were subsequently modified to E235 series specifications when the E231-500 series trains were withdrawn from the Yamanote Line.

The remaining two trainsets, sets 4 and 5, use newly built SaHa E235-500 series cars in the tenth position. These cars were introduced to allow the modification of the remaining cars to be completed within a 90-day period, as completing the work within 45 days was considered impractical.

=== Special liveries ===
Between October and December 2022, set 15 was repainted into an all-over black livery to commemorate the 150th anniversary of the opening of the first railway in Japan. The Netflix logo also appears on the sides of the carriages.

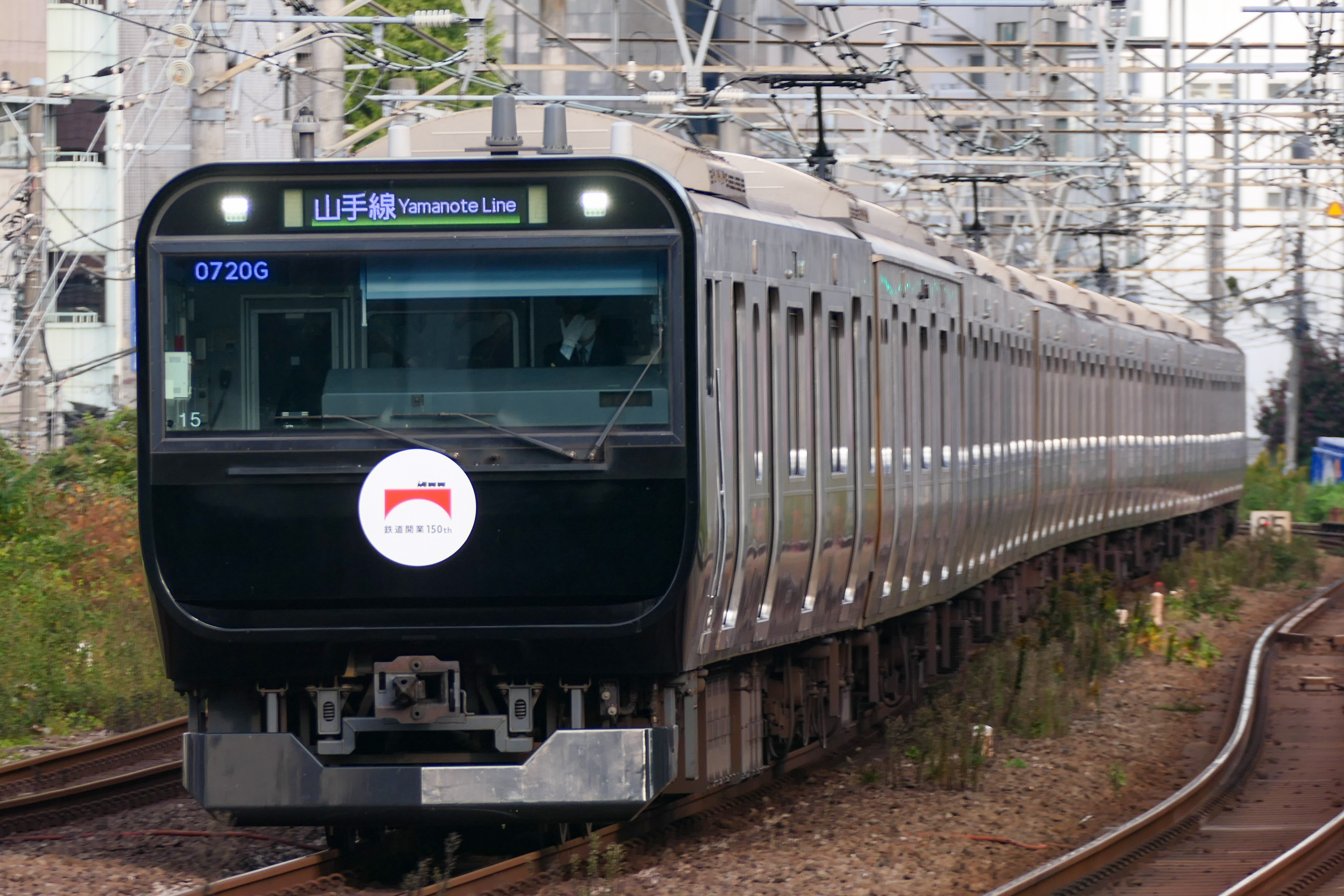
Set 15 in all-over black livery, November 2022

On 16 September 2025, JR East announced that it would be operating a pair of E235 series trainsets with a special design commemorating 100 years since the opening of the existing Yamanote Line loop route. The designs will pay tribute to former 103 series and 205 series that formerly operated on the line.

=== Future plans ===
In September 2025, JR East announced that it had plans to transfer a number of sets to operate on the Chūō-Sōbu Line. The first set to be transferred, 31, was commissioned in July 2026 and renumbered B31. The second set, 33, was commissioned in September of that year and renumbered B33. Both sets' SaHa E235-4600 cars were removed.

== E235-1000 series ==
E235-1000 series
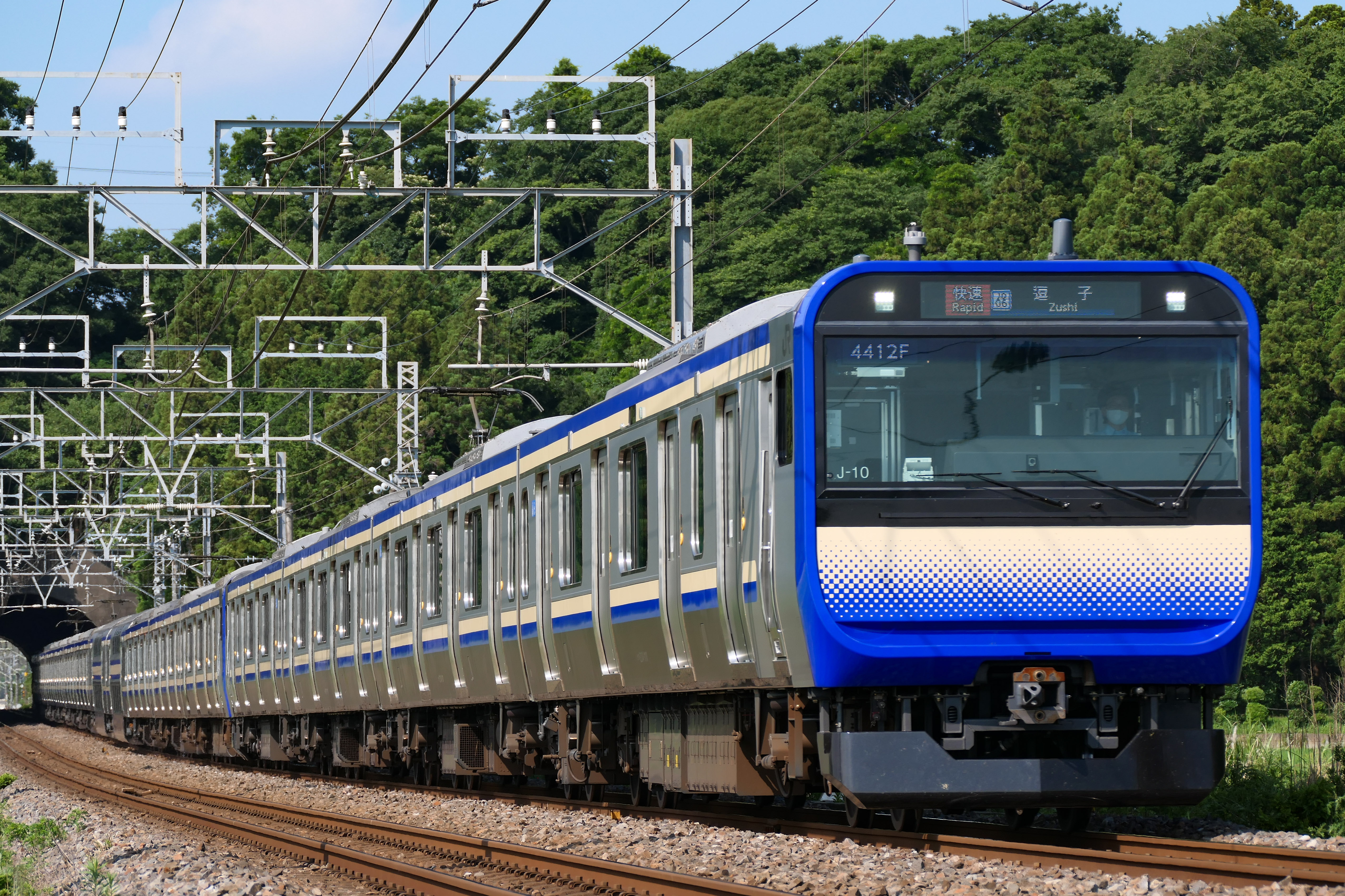
- A 15-car E235-1000 series consist with set J-10 leading, June 2021
- Built at: Akiha-ku, Niigata; Kanazawa-ku, Yokohama (Green cars)
- Replaced: E217 series
- Constructed: 2020–2025
- Entered service: 21 December 2020
- Number built: 715 vehicles (as of December 2024)
- Number in service: 715 vehicles (93 sets) (as of December 2024)
- Formation: 11/4 cars per trainset
- Fleet numbers: F-01 – F-49 (11-car sets); J-01 – J-44 (4-car sets)
- Depot: Kamakura
- Lines served: Yokosuka Line; Sōbu Line (Rapid); Narita Line; Sōbu Main Line; ■ Kashima Line; ■ Uchibō Line; ■ Sotobō Line

Specifications
- Train length: 220 m (721 ft 9 in) (11-car sets, including couplers); 80 m (262 ft 6 in) (4-car sets, including couplers)
- Doors: 4 pairs per side; 2 doors per side (Green cars)
- Traction system: Mitsubishi SC104A SiC-MOSFET–VVVF
- UIC classification: 2′2′+Bo′Bo′+Bo′Bo′+2′2′+Bo′Bo′+Bo′Bo′+2′2′+2′2′+Bo′Bo′+Bo′Bo′+2′2′ (11-car sets); 2′2′+Bo′Bo′+Bo′Bo′+2′2′ (4-car sets)

The E235-1000 series fleet consist of a total of 745 cars (consisting of 49 11-car trains and 44 four-car trains) for use on the Sōbu Line (Rapid) and Yokosuka Line, replacing the E217 series in use since 1994. The fleet was introduced into service on 21 December 2020.

On 21 April 2020, the Green cars of the first set were completed at the J-TREC factory in Kanazawa-ku, Yokohama and transported to the J-TREC factory in Niigata to be joined with standard cars. On 3 June 2020, the first 11-car set was completed at Niigata; it was delivered to Kamakura Depot on 8 June 2020. The first 4-car set was completed at Niigata on 16 June 2020 and was delivered on 19 June 2020.

=== Formations ===
==== 11-car sets ====
As of 28 April 2022, 49 11-car sets (F-01–F-49) are based at Kamakura Depot and formed with six motored ("M") cars and five non-powered trailer ("T") cars.

	← Kimitsu, Narita Airport Kurihama →										
Car No.	11	10	9	8	7	6	5	4	3	2	1
Designation	Tc	M1	M2	T	M1	M2	Tsd	Tsd'	M1	M2	Tc'
Numbering	KuHa E235-1000	MoHa E235-1000	MoHa E234-1000	SaHa E235-1000	MoHa E235-1200	MoHa E234-1200	SaRo E235-1000	SaRo E234-1000	MoHa E235-1300	MoHa E234-1300	KuHa E234-1000

- Cars 7 and 10 each have one single-arm pantograph and car 3 has two single-arm pantographs (one used as a backup).
- All cars (except cars 4 and 5) have an accessible/priority "free space".
- Cars 1, 5, and 6 each have a toilet (universal design in cars 1 and 6).
- Car 8 is designated as a mildly air-conditioned car.
- Cars 4 and 5 are bilevel Green Cars.
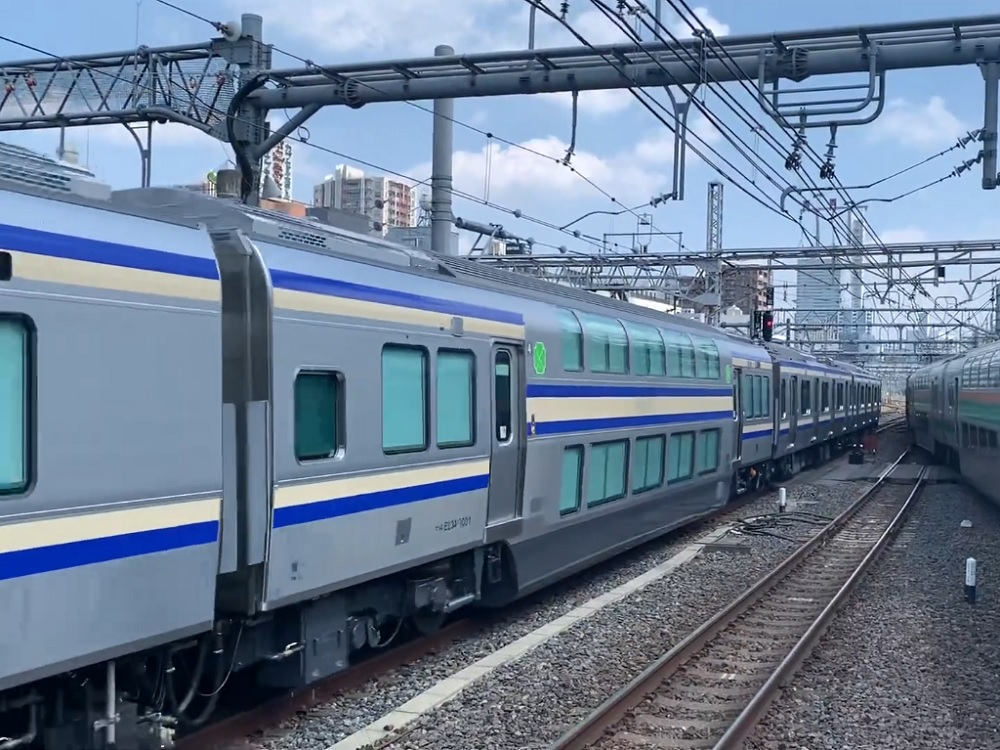
Bi-level Green car

==== 4-car sets ====
As of 14 June 2021, 44 four-car sets (J-01–J-44) are based at Kamakura Depot and formed with two motored ("M") cars and two non-powered trailer ("T") cars.

	← Kimitsu Kurihama →			
Car No.	+4	+3	+2	+1
Designation	Tc	M1	M2	Tc'
Numbering	KuHa E235-1100	MoHa E235-1100	MoHa E234-1100	KuHa E234-1100

- Car +3 has two single-arm pantographs (one used as a backup).
- All cars have an accessible/priority "free space".
- Car +1 has a universal design toilet.

=== Interior ===
Passenger accommodation for ordinary cars consists of longitudinal bench seating throughout. A space for wheelchairs or strollers is provided at one end of each car, except on Green cars. The seats are 10 mm (0.4 in) wider than those seen in earlier E217 series cars. The information screens measure 21 inches (530 mm), and display information in multiple languages. LED lighting is used throughout. Surveillance cameras are also equipped in order to increase safety.

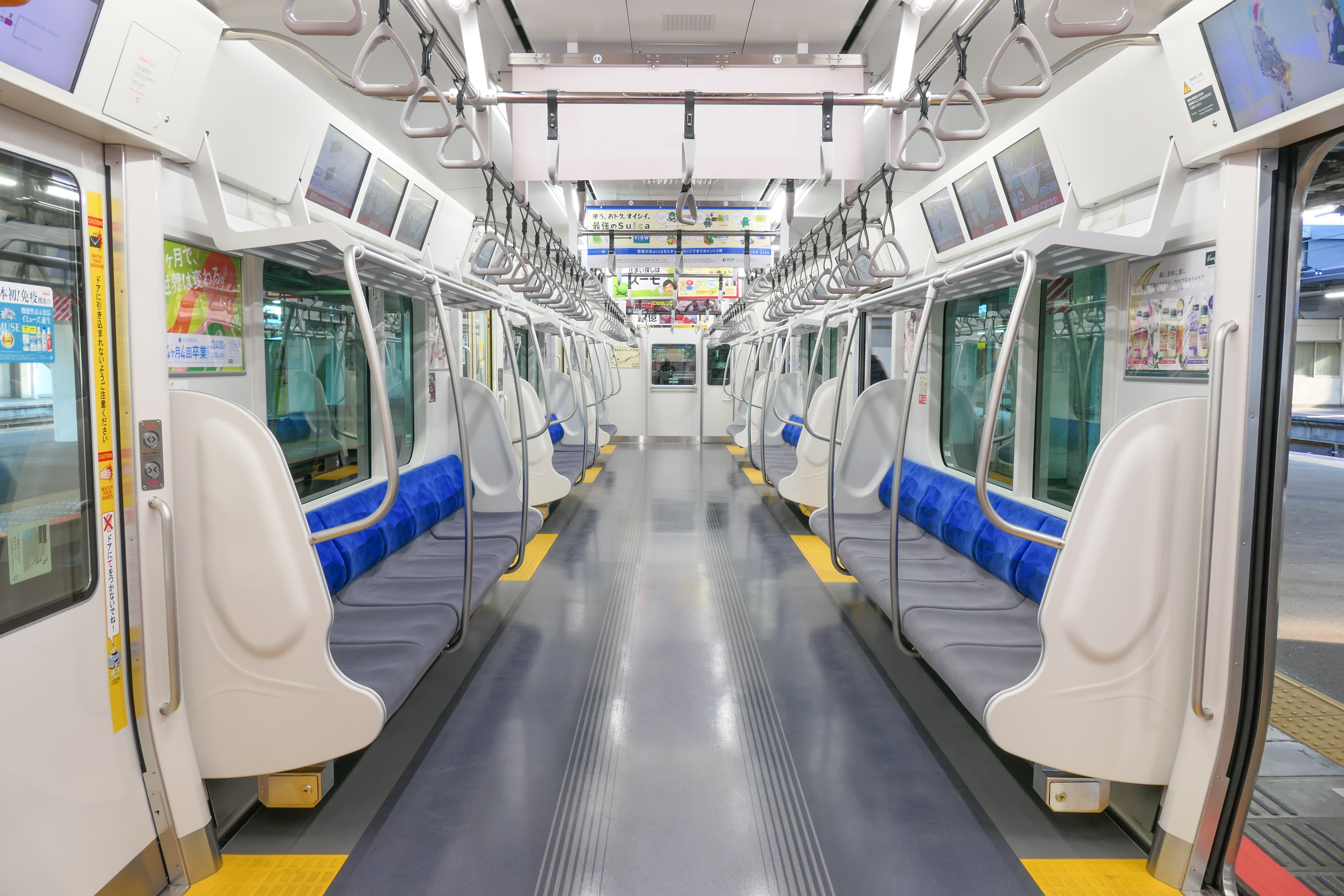
Interior

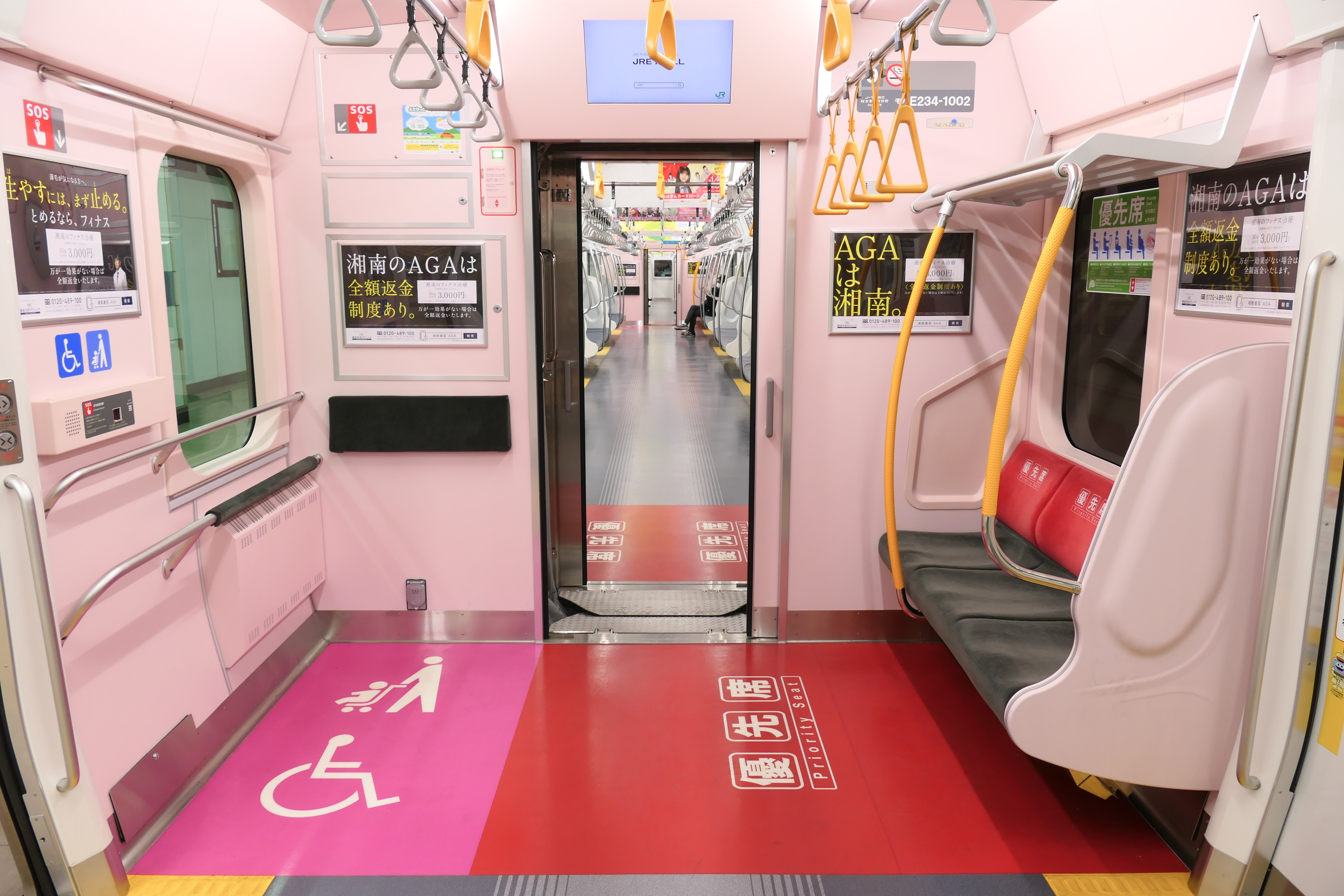
Wheelchair and stroller space

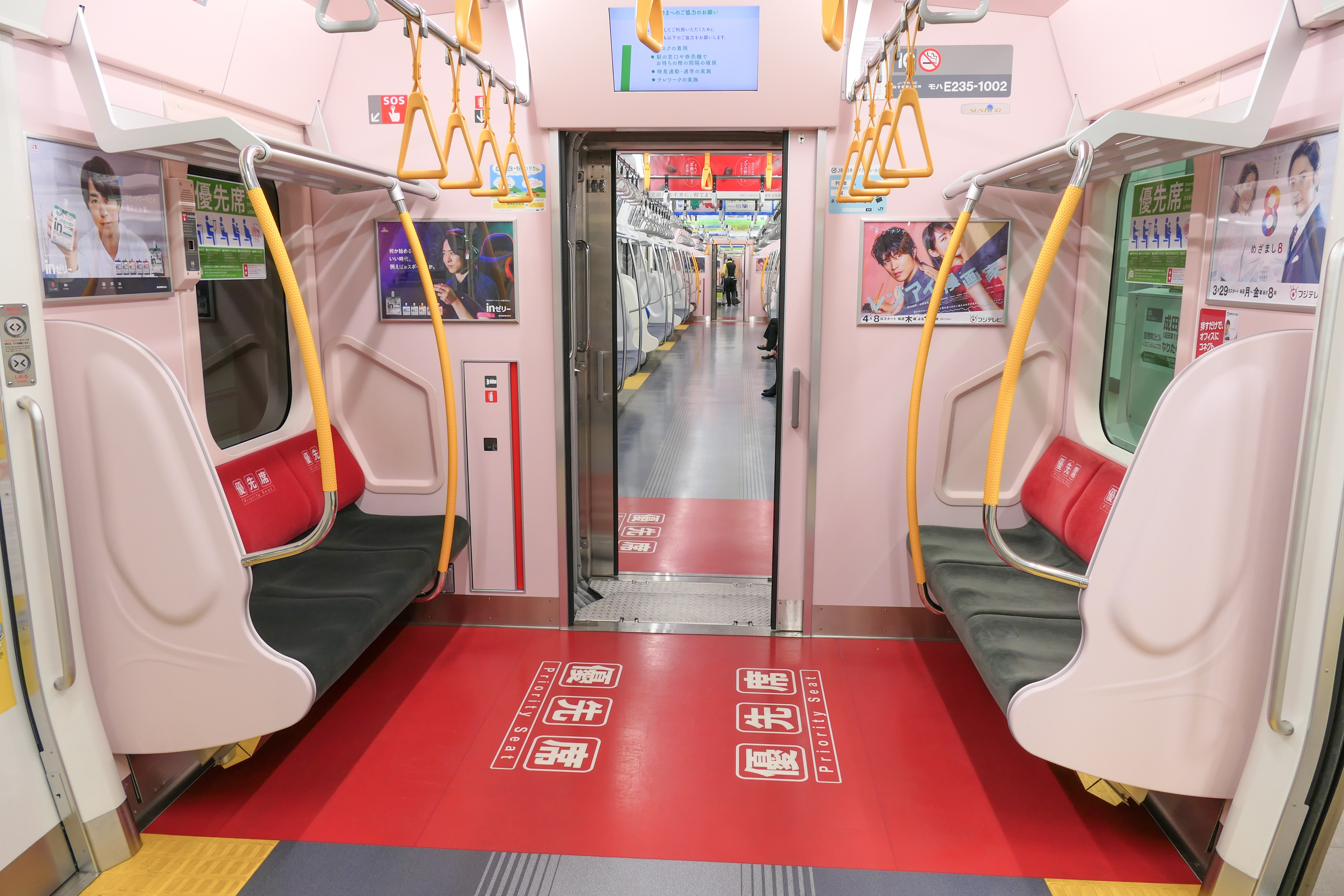
Priority seating

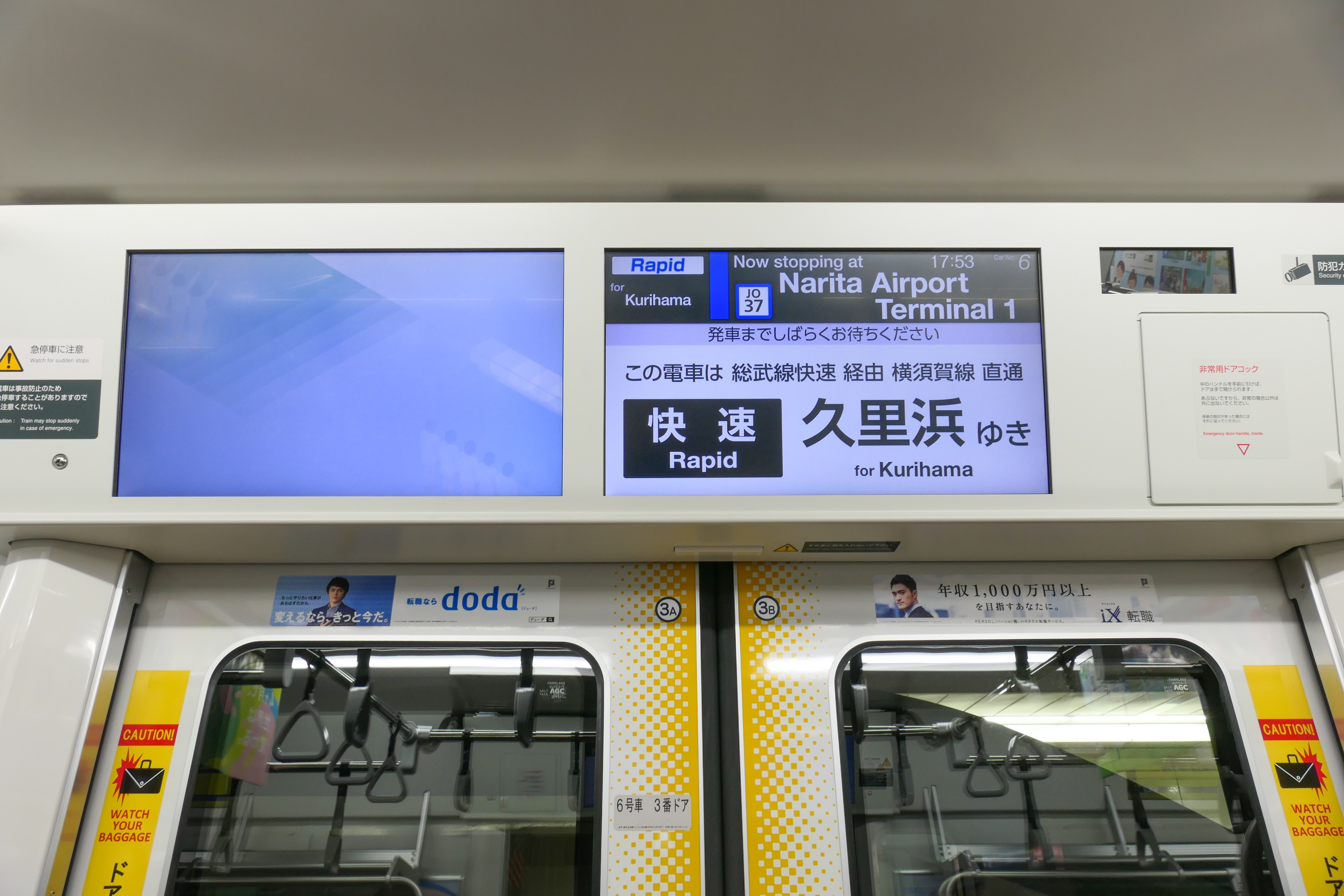
Passenger information screen

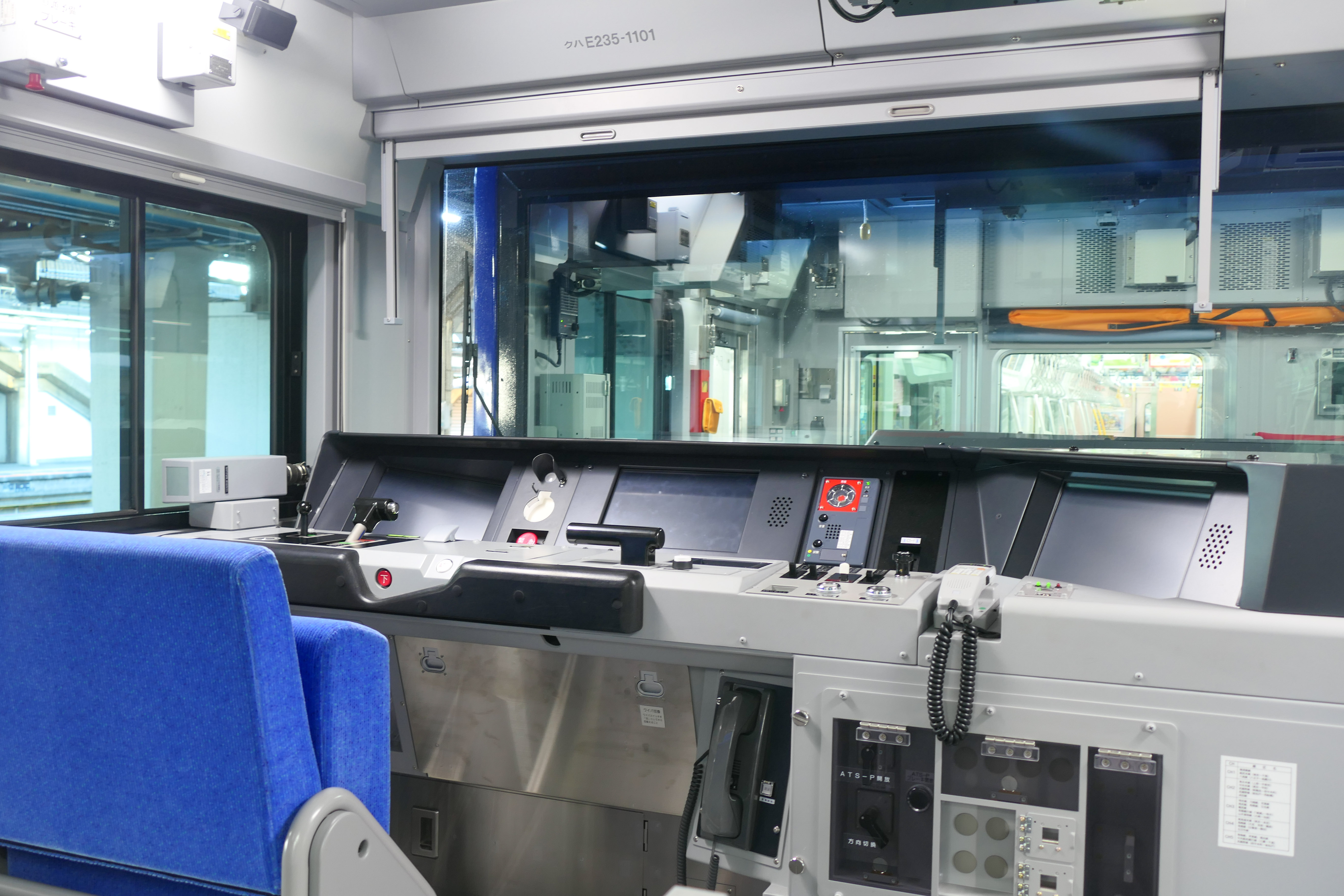
Driver's cab

Green car accommodation consists of reclining, 2+2 abreast seating throughout. Power outlets are equipped under the seats' armrests.

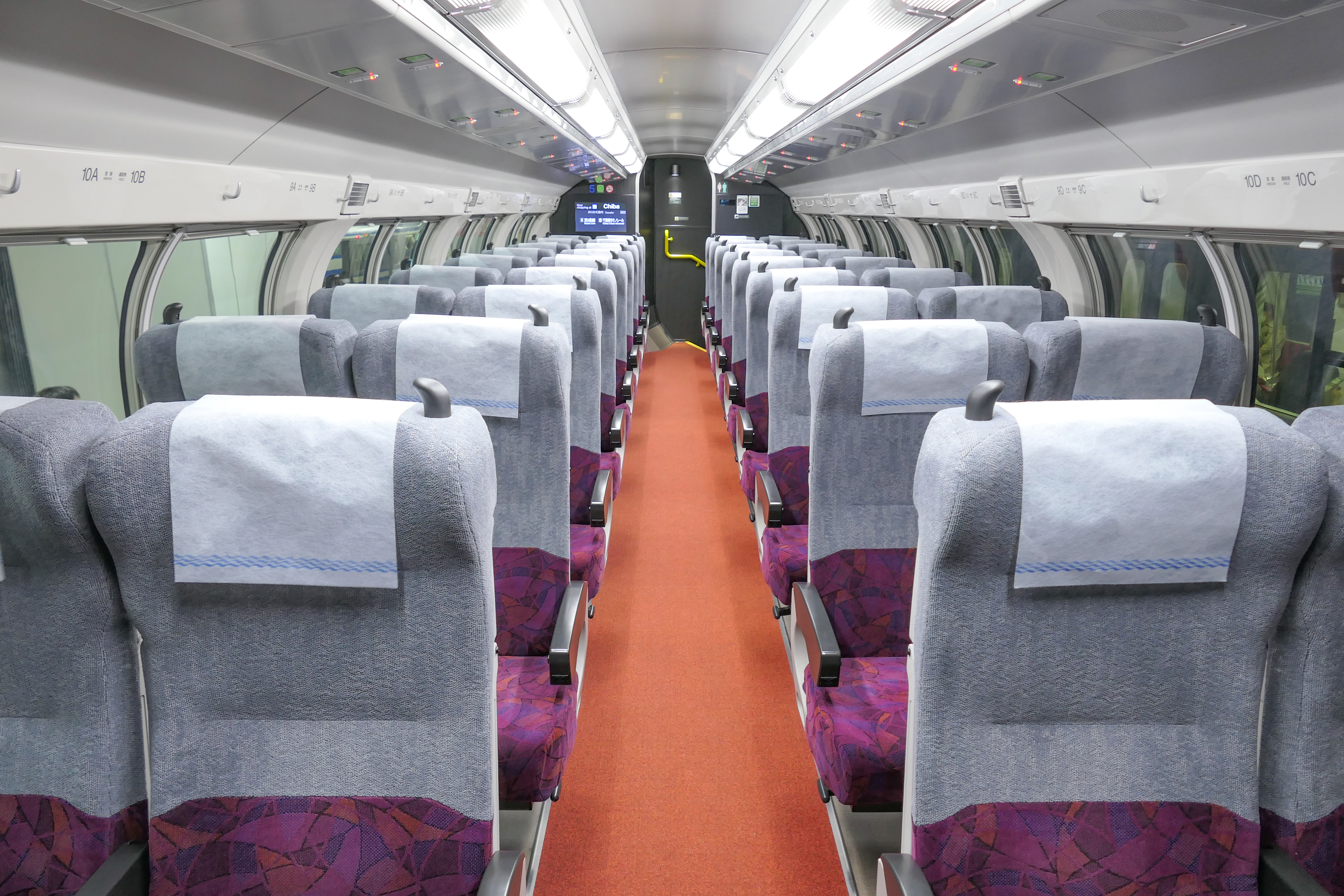
Upper level of a Green car

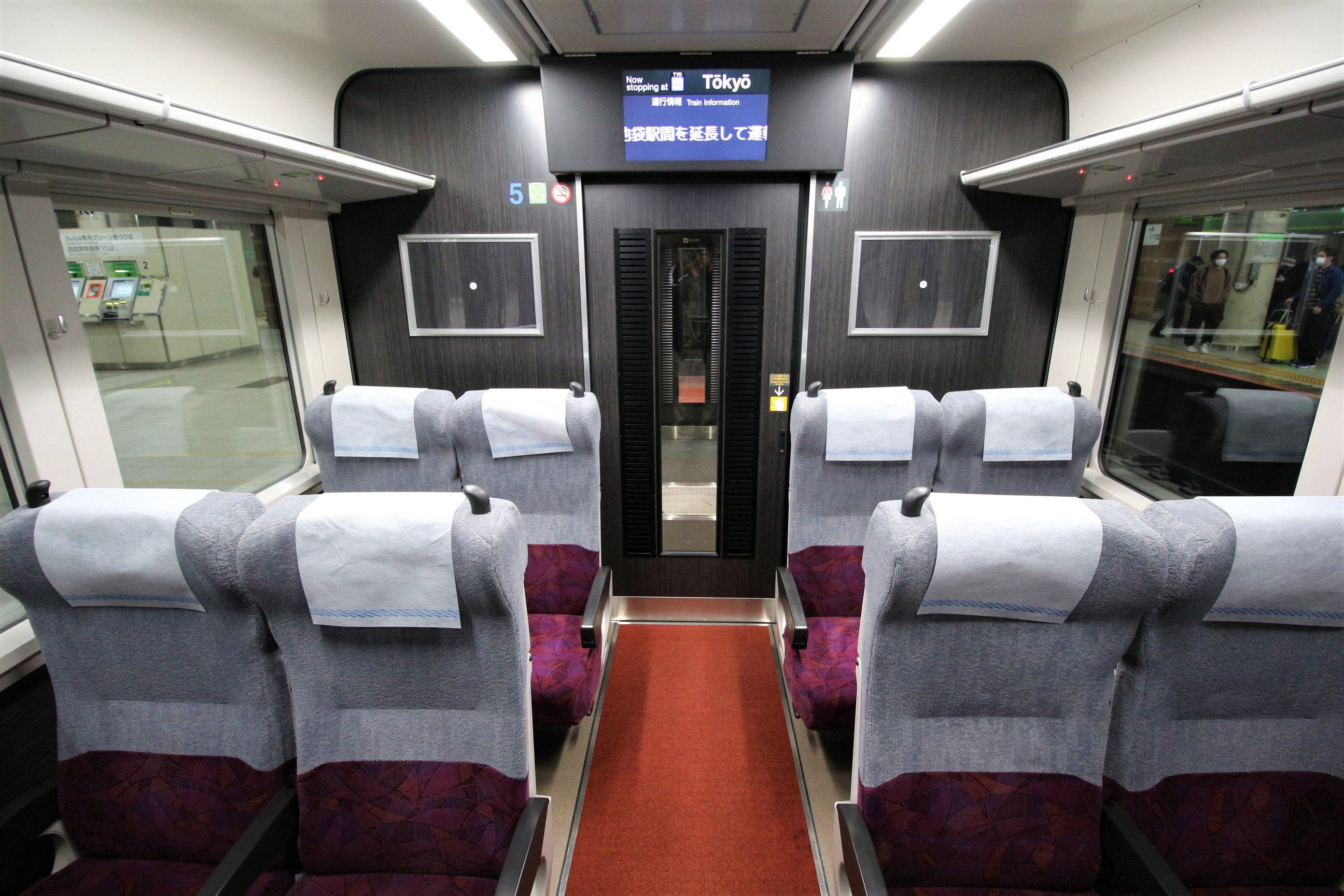
Intermediate level of a Green car

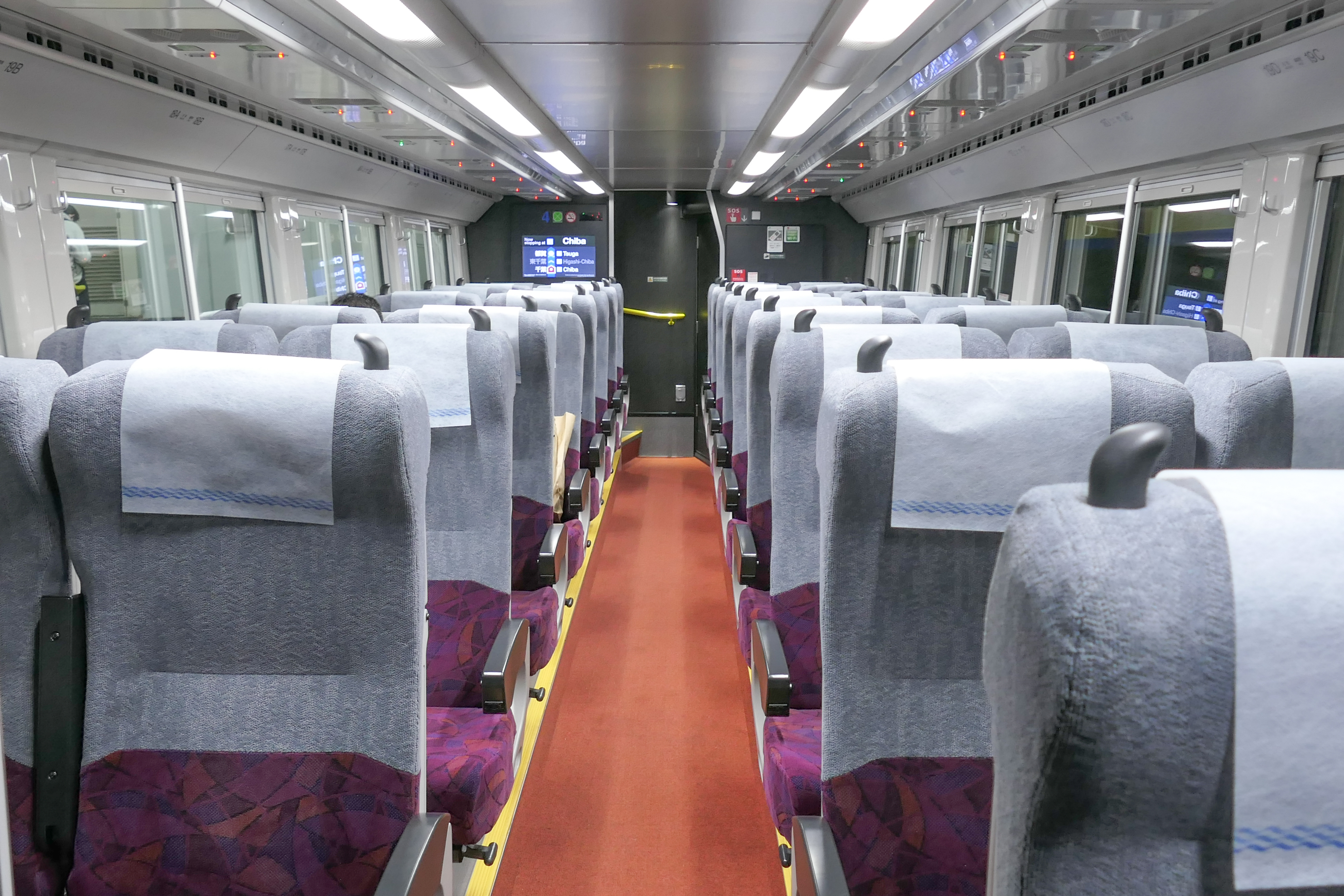
Lower level of a Green car
