= Home Liner Chiba =

Japanese train service (1984–2019)

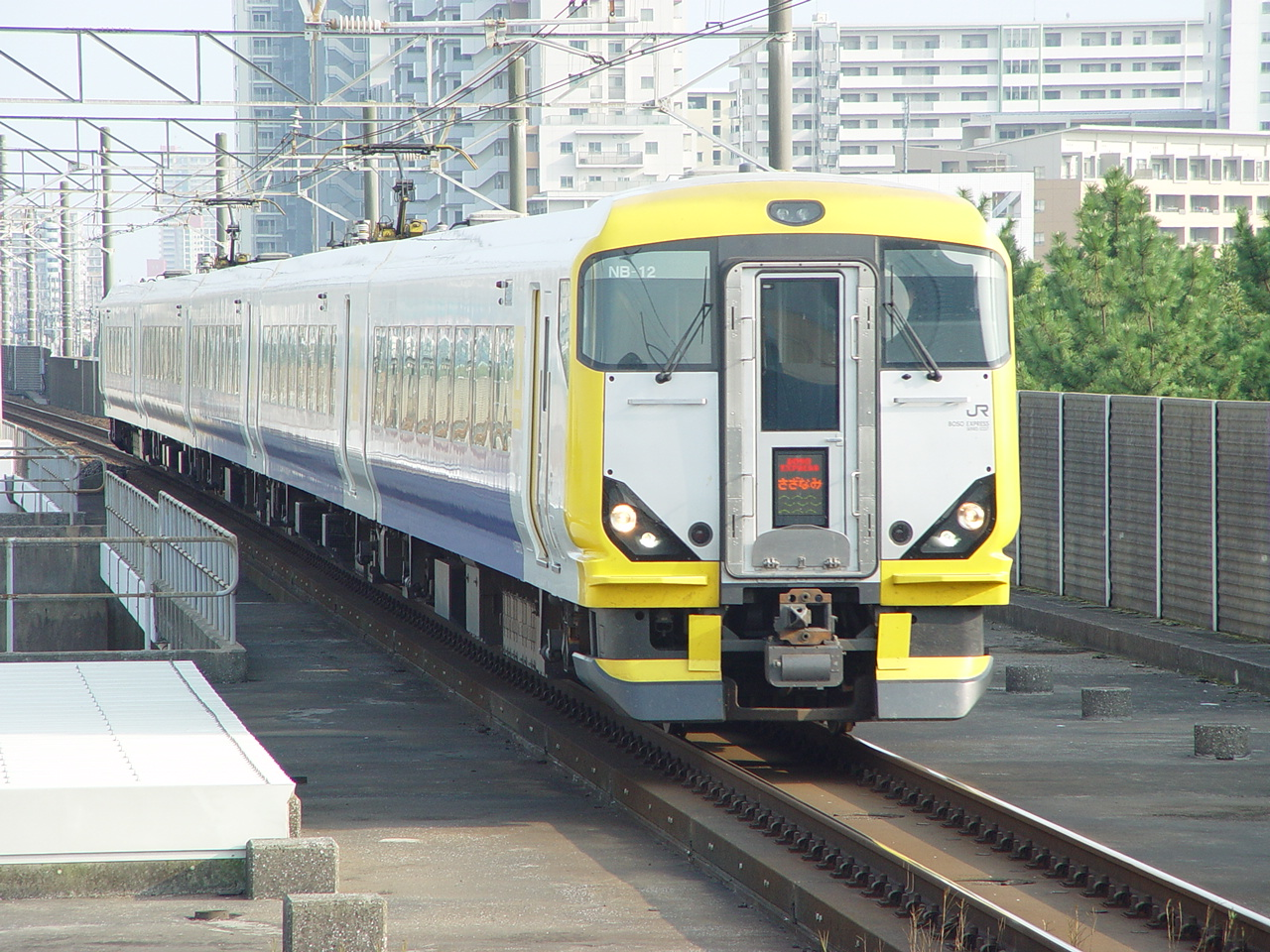
- An E257-500 series unit

Overview
- Service type: Liner
- Locale: Kanto region, Japan
- First service: 1984
- Last service: 15 March 2019
- Current operator(s): JR East

Route
- Termini: Tokyo / Shinjuku; Chiba
- Line(s) used: Sobu Main Line and Chuo Main Line

Technical
- Rolling stock: E257-500 series EMUs
- Track gauge: 1,067 mm (3 ft 6 in)
- Electrification: 1,500 V DC overhead

The Home Liner Chiba (ホームライナー千葉) was a limited-stop reserved-seat "Home Liner" service for commuters on the Sobu Main Line and Chuo Main Line operated by East Japan Railway Company (JR East). The train operated in the weekday evenings only. All seats were reserved with a supplement of 510 yen. With the timetable revision starting on 16 March 2019, this service was discontinued.

== Route ==
- Home Liner Chiba 1, 3, 7 and 9 (via Sobu Line (Rapid))
  - Tokyo - Funabashi - Tsudanuma - Inage - Chiba
- Home Liner Chiba 5 (via Chuo-Sobu Line)
  - Shinjuku - Akihabara - Funabashi - Tsudanuma - Inage - Chiba

== Rolling stock ==
=== Former ===
- E257-500 series

== See also ==
- Home Liner
