= Shin-Kemigawa Station =

Railway station in Chiba, Japan

JB36 Shin-Kemigawa Station 新検見川駅
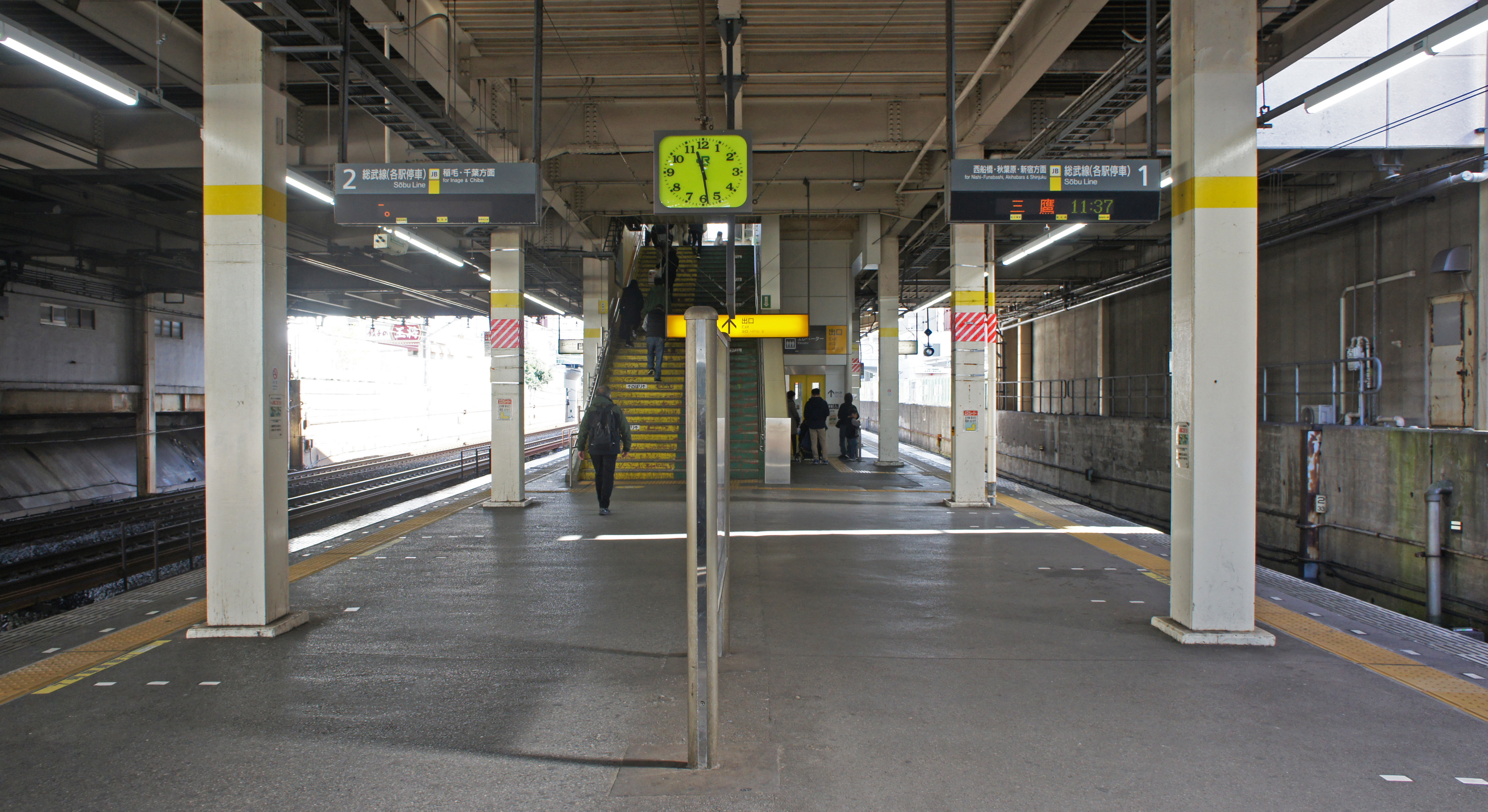
- JR Shinkenmikawa Station Platform

General information
- Location: 2 Minami Hanazono, Hanamigawa-ku, Chiba-shi, Chiba-ken 262–0022; Japan
- Coordinates: 35.6514°N 140.0731°E
- Operator: JR East
- Line: Chuo-Sobu Line
- Distance: 33.2 km from Tokyo
- Platforms: 1 island platform
- Tracks: 4

Other information
- Station code: JB-36
- Website: Official website

History
- Opened: 15 July 1951

Passengers
- FY2019: 22,703 daily

Services
Preceding station	JR East	Following station
Makuhari JB35 towards Mitaka	Chūō–Sōbu Line	Inage JB37 towards Chiba
Location
- Location within Chiba Prefecture Location within Japan

Shin-Kemigawa Station (新検見川駅, Shin-Kemigawa-eki) is a passenger railway station located in Hanamigawa-ku, Chiba, Japan, operated by East Japan Railway Company (JR East).

== Lines ==
Shin-Kemigawa Station is served by the Chūō-Sōbu Line (local service) and is located 6.0 kilometers from Chiba Station and 33.2 kilometers from the starting point of the line at Tokyo Station.

== Station layout ==
The station consists of an island platform serving two tracks with an elevated station building located above the platform and tracks. The station is staffed. There are also two express tracks north of track 2; these are used by rapid Sōbu Main Line trains that pass through the station non-stop.

=== Platforms ===
1	Chūō-Sōbu Line	for Tsudanuma, Akihabara, Shinjuku, and Mitaka
2	Chūō-Sōbu Line	for Inage and Chiba

== History ==
The station opened on 15 July 1951. The station was absorbed into the JR East network upon the privatization of the Japan National Railways (JNR) on 1 April 1987.

== Passenger statistics ==
In fiscal 2019, the station was used by an average of 22,703 passengers daily (boarding passengers only).

== Surrounding area ==
- Kemigawa Station – Approximately 5 minutes on foot
- Higashi Kanto Expressway
- Chiba City Hanazono Junior High School
- Chiba City Hanazono Elementary School

== See also ==
- List of railway stations in Japan
