= Ōkubo Station (Tokyo) =

Railway station in Tokyo, Japan

Coordinates: 35.7007°N 139.6973°E

JB09 Ōkubo Station 大久保駅
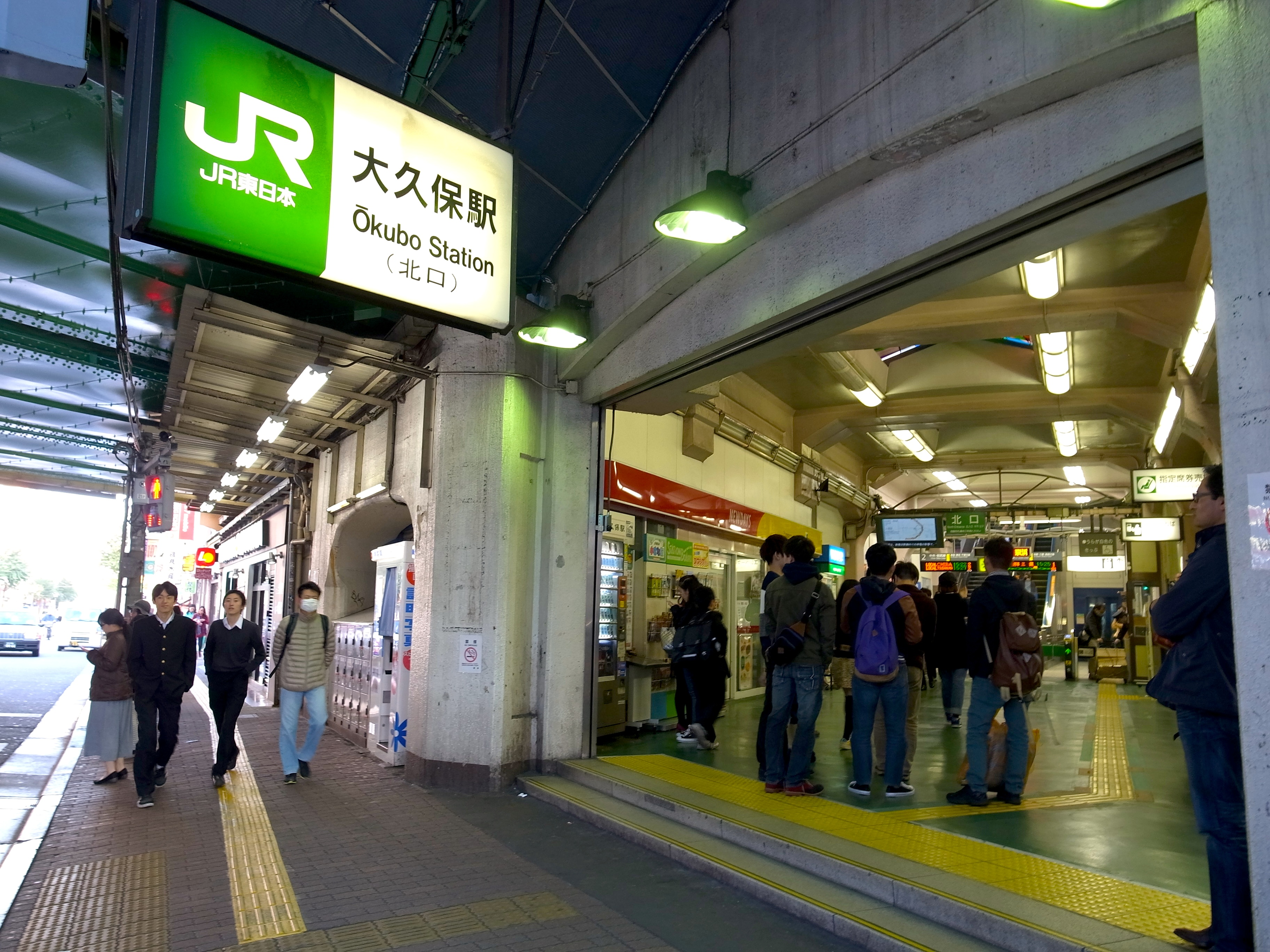
- North station entrance, November 2014

General information
- Location: 1-17-1 Hyakuninchō, Shinjuku, Tokyo （東京都新宿区百人町一丁目17-1） Japan
- Operator: JR East
- Line: Chūō-Sōbu Line

History
- Opened: 1895

Passengers
- FY2011: 23,997 daily

Services
Preceding station	JR East	Following station
Higashi-Nakano JB08 towards Mitaka	Chūō–Sōbu Line	Shinjuku towards Chiba
Location

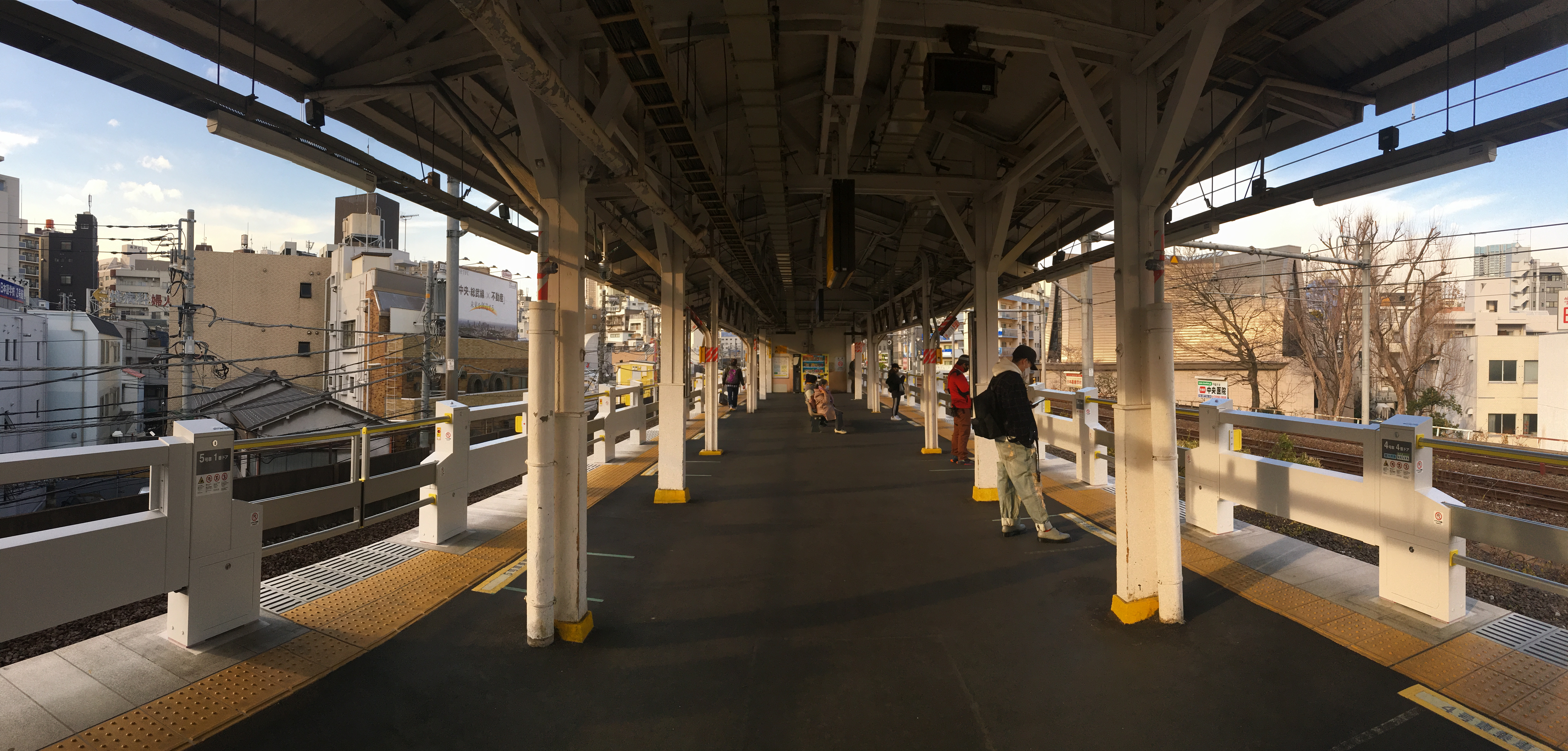
Platforms, 17 January 2022

Ōkubo Station (大久保駅, Ōkubo-eki) is a railway station on the Chūō-Sōbu Line in Shinjuku, Tokyo, Japan, operated by East Japan Railway Company (JR East).

== Station layout ==
Ōkubo has a single island platform serving two tracks. Westbound trains to Mitaka stop at track 1, while eastbound trains to central Tokyo and Chiba use track 2. In addition, there are two express tracks east of track 2; these are used by Chūō Line (Rapid) trains that bypass the station.

=== Platforms ===
1	Chūō-Sōbu Line	for Nakano, Mitaka
2	Chūō-Sōbu Line	for Shinjuku, Kinshicho, Tsudanuma and Chiba

== History ==
Ōkubo station opened on 5 May 1895 as part of the Kinoe railway with both passenger and freight rail services. On 1 October 1906, the station and all trains serving were nationalised into Japanese National Railways (JNR). Twenty-five years later in 1931, freight services were discontinued at Ōkubo station. Upon the privatisation of JNR on 1 April 1989, Ōkubo station became part of JR East, which comprises all trains serving the eastern and northern sections of Honshu. Beginning in November 2001, the Suica RFID-based electronic ticketing system has been accepted at Ōkubo station.

== Surrounding area ==
Ōkubo station is located in the northern section of Shinjuku in the Hyakuninchō neighborhood. Nearby is the Ōkubo neighborhood, one of Tokyo's largest Korean areas. Specifically, the station lies to the south of Ōkubo Street (大久保通り, Ōkubo-dōri) and west of the Yamanote Line-enclosed city center, making it the first stop westbound outside of central Tokyo.

About 150 m (492 ft) to the east lies Shin-Ōkubo Station on the Yamanote Line. Despite their proximity as well as being owned by JR East, the two stations are not connected. Passengers wishing to change from the Chūō-Sōbu Line to the Yamanote Line must do so at the next eastbound stop, Shinjuku.

Near the station, Okubo-dori (Okubo street) and surrounding side streets are lined with shops selling Korean food and pop-culture items. Also in the vicinity are Korean-themed bars, nightclubs, and restaurants.

== Passenger statistics ==
In fiscal 2011, the station was used by an average of 23,997 passengers daily (boarding passengers only).
