= Shimōsa-Nakayama Station =

Railway station in Funabashi, Chiba Prefecture, Japan

JB29 Shimōsa-Nakayama Station 下総中山駅
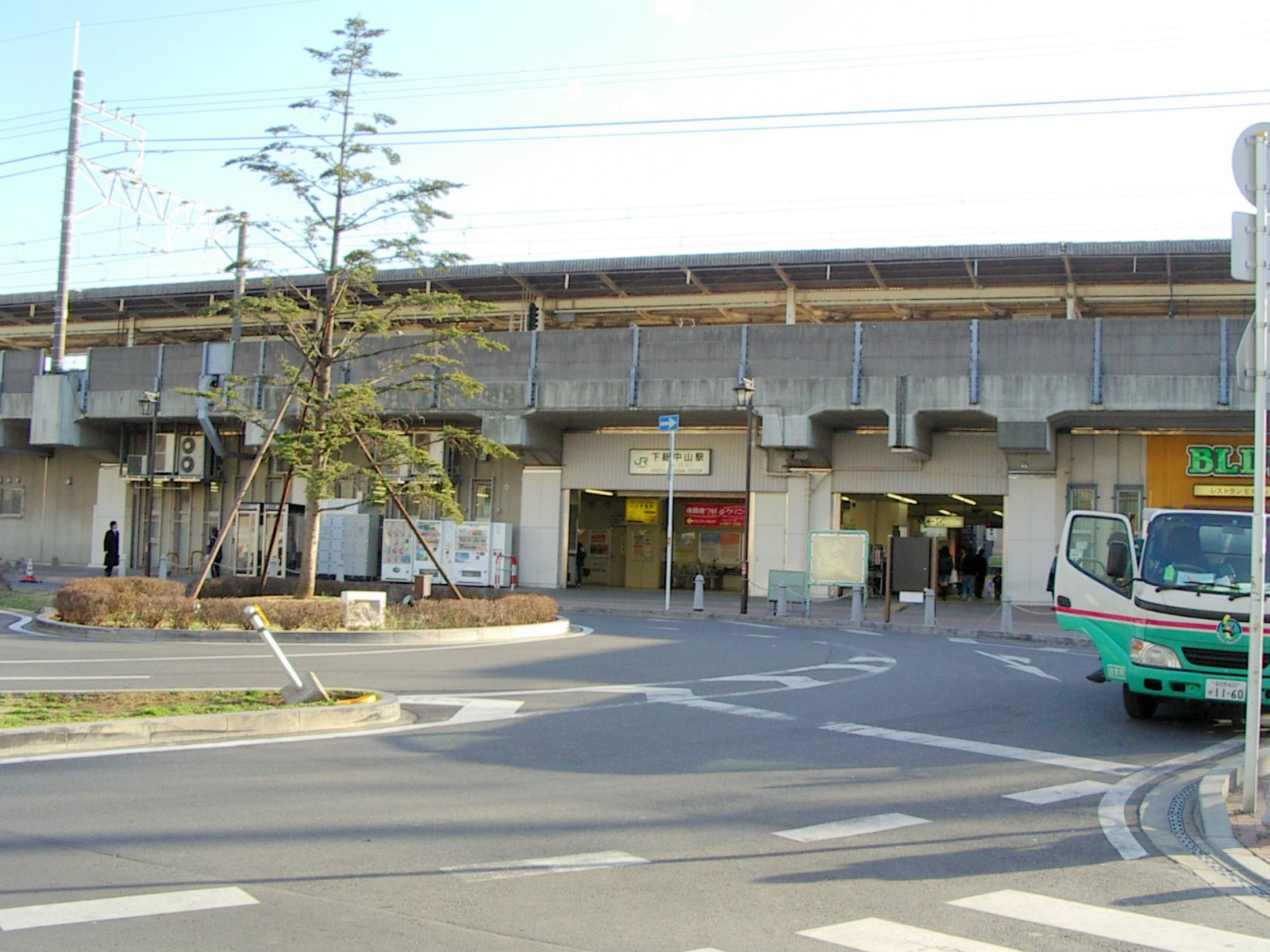
- Shimōsa-Nakayama Station north side, March 2007

General information
- Location: 2-17 Motonakayama, Funabashi-shi, Chiba-ken 273-0035; Japan
- Coordinates: 35.7141°N 139.9431°E
- Operator: JR East
- Line: Chūō-Sōbu Line
- Distance: 19.0 km from Tokyo
- Platforms: 1 island platforms

Other information
- Status: Staffed
- Website: Official website

History
- Opened: 12 April 1895

Passengers
- FY2019: 24,181

Services
| Preceding station | JR East | Following station |
|---|---|---|
| Moto-Yawata JB28 towards Mitaka | Chūō–Sōbu Line | Nishi-Funabashi JB30 towards Chiba |
Location
- Location within Chiba Prefecture Location within Japan

Shimōsa-Nakayama Station (下総中山駅, Shimōsa-Nakayama-eki) is a passenger railway station in the city of Funabashi, Chiba, Japan, operated by East Japan Railway Company (JR East).

== Lines ==
Shimōsa-Nakayama Station is served by Chūō-Sōbu Line local services and is located 19.0 kilometers from the starting point of the line at Tokyo and 20.2 kilometers from Chiba.

== Station layout ==
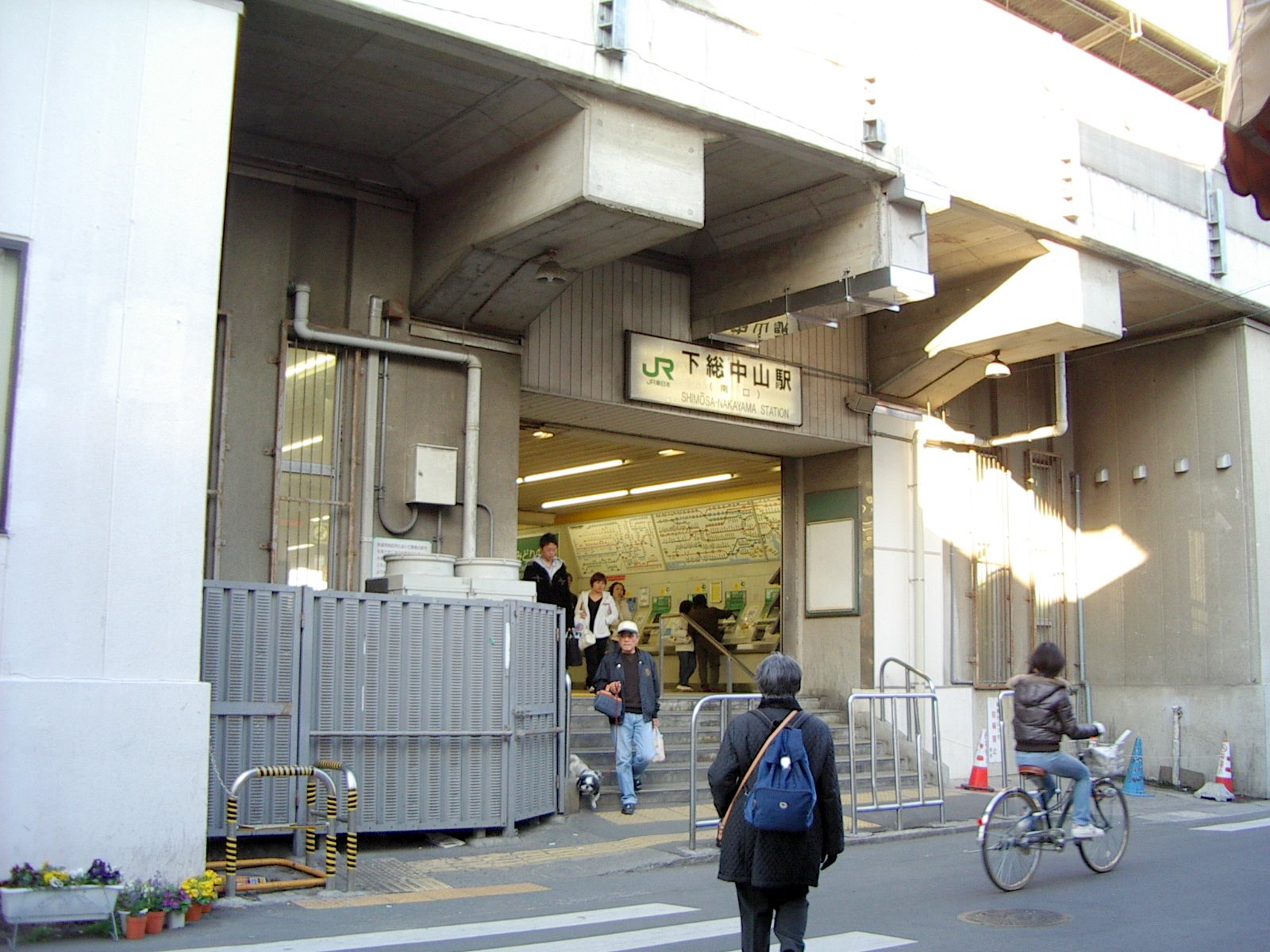
South entrance, March 2007

The station consists of an elevated island platform serving two tracks, with the station building underneath. The station is staffed.

=== Platforms ===
| 1 | Chūō-Sōbu Line | for Kinshichō, Akihabara, and Shinjuku |
| 2 | Chūō-Sōbu Line | for Funabashi, Tsudanuma, and Chiba |

== History ==
Shimōsa-Nakayama Station opened on 12 April 1895.

== Passenger statistics ==
In fiscal 2019, the station was used by an average of 24,181 passengers daily (boarding passengers only).

The passenger figures (boarding passengers only) for previous years are as shown below:

| Fiscal year | Daily average |
|---|---|
| 2000 | 21,720 |
| 2005 | 22,835 |
| 2010 | 23,325 |
| 2015 | 22,902 |

== Surrounding area ==
=== South side ===
- Keisei Nakayama Station (Keisei Main Line)
- Hokekyō-ji Temple

=== North side ===
- Funabashi No. 6 Junior High School

== See also ==
- List of railway stations in Japan
