= Nishi-Chiba Station =

Railway station in Chiba, Japan

JB38 Nishi-Chiba Station 西千葉駅
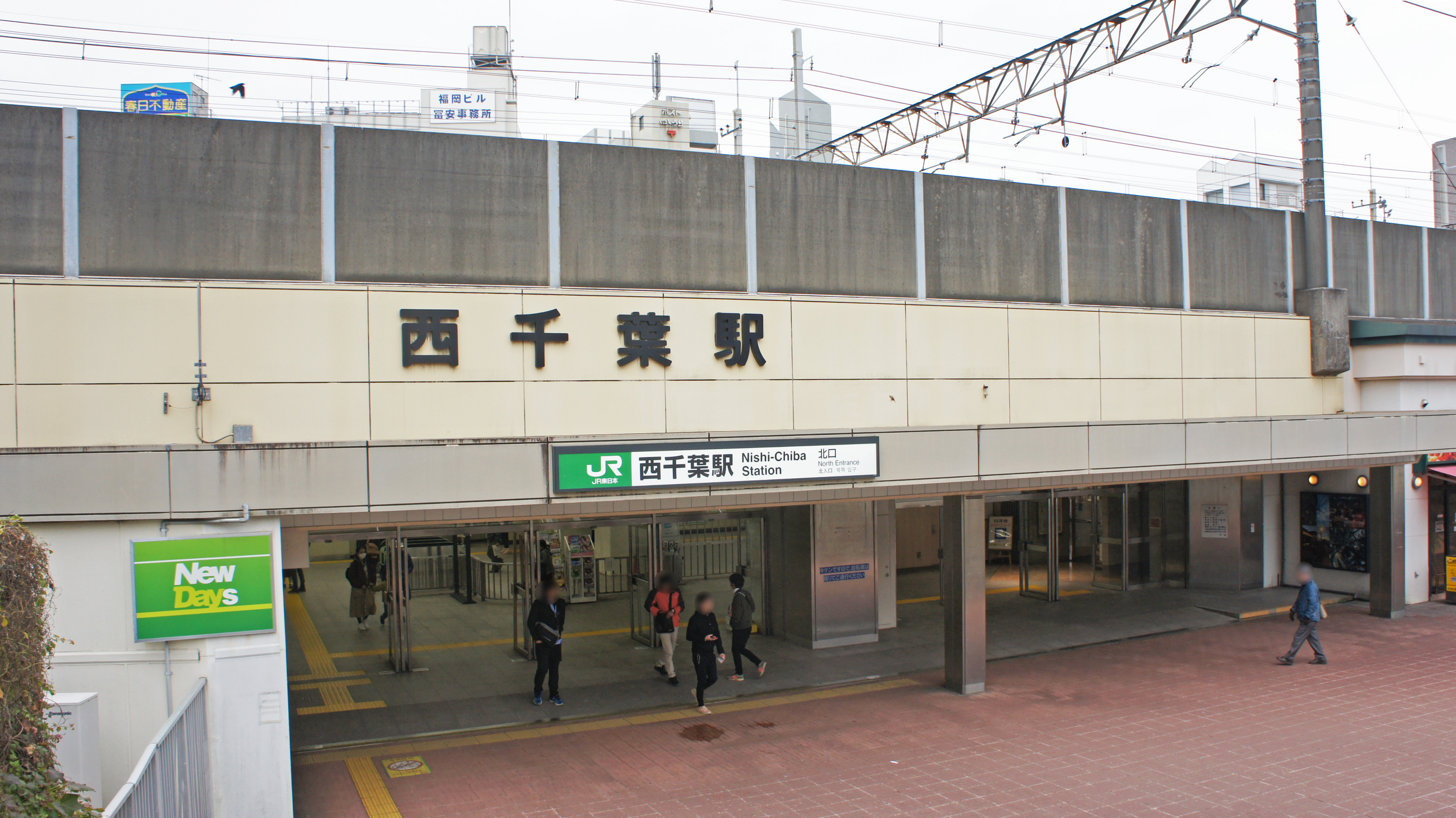
- North exit Nishi-Chiba Station, December 2019

General information
- Location: 2-24-2 Kasuga, Chūō-ku, Chiba-shi, Chiba-ken 260-0033; Japan
- Coordinates: 35°37′21.06″N 140°06′12.34″E
- Operator: JR East
- Line: Chūō-Sōbu Line
- Platforms: 1island platform

Other information
- Status: Staffed
- Station code: JB38
- Website: Official website

History
- Opened: October 1, 1942

Passengers
- FY2019: 22,000 daily

Services
Preceding station	JR East	Following station
Inage JB37 towards Mitaka	Chūō–Sōbu Line	Chiba JB39 Terminus
Location
- Location within Chiba Prefecture Location within Japan

Nishi-Chiba Station (西千葉駅, Nishi-Chiba-eki) is a passenger railway station located in Chūō-ku, Chiba, Japan, operated by East Japan Railway Company (JR East).

== Lines ==
Nishi-Chiba Station is served by the Chūō-Sōbu Line and is located 1.4 kilometers from Chiba Station and 37.8 kilometers from the starting point of the line at Tokyo Station.

== Station layout ==
The station consists of an island platform serving two tracks with ab elevated station building located above the platform and tracks. The station is staffed. There are also two express tracks north of track 2; these are used by rapid Sōbu Main Line trains that pass through the station non-stop.

=== Platforms ===
1	Chūō-Sōbu Line	for Nishi-Funabashi, Akihabara, and Shinjuku
2	Chūō-Sōbu Line	for Chiba

== History ==
The station opened on October 1, 1942. The station was absorbed into the JR East network upon the privatization of the Japan National Railways (JNR) on April 1, 1987.

== Passenger statistics ==
In fiscal 2019, the station was used by an average of 22,000 passengers daily (boarding passengers only).

== Surrounding area ==
- Chiba University Nishi-Chiba campus
- University of Tokyo Institute of Industrial Science Chiba campus
- Chiba Keizai University
- Keiai University
- Chiba Prefectural Chiba Commerce High school
- Chiba Prefectural Chiba-Higashi High school
