= Higashi-Nakano Station =

Railway and metro station in Tokyo, Japan

JB08 Higashi-Nakano Station 東中野駅

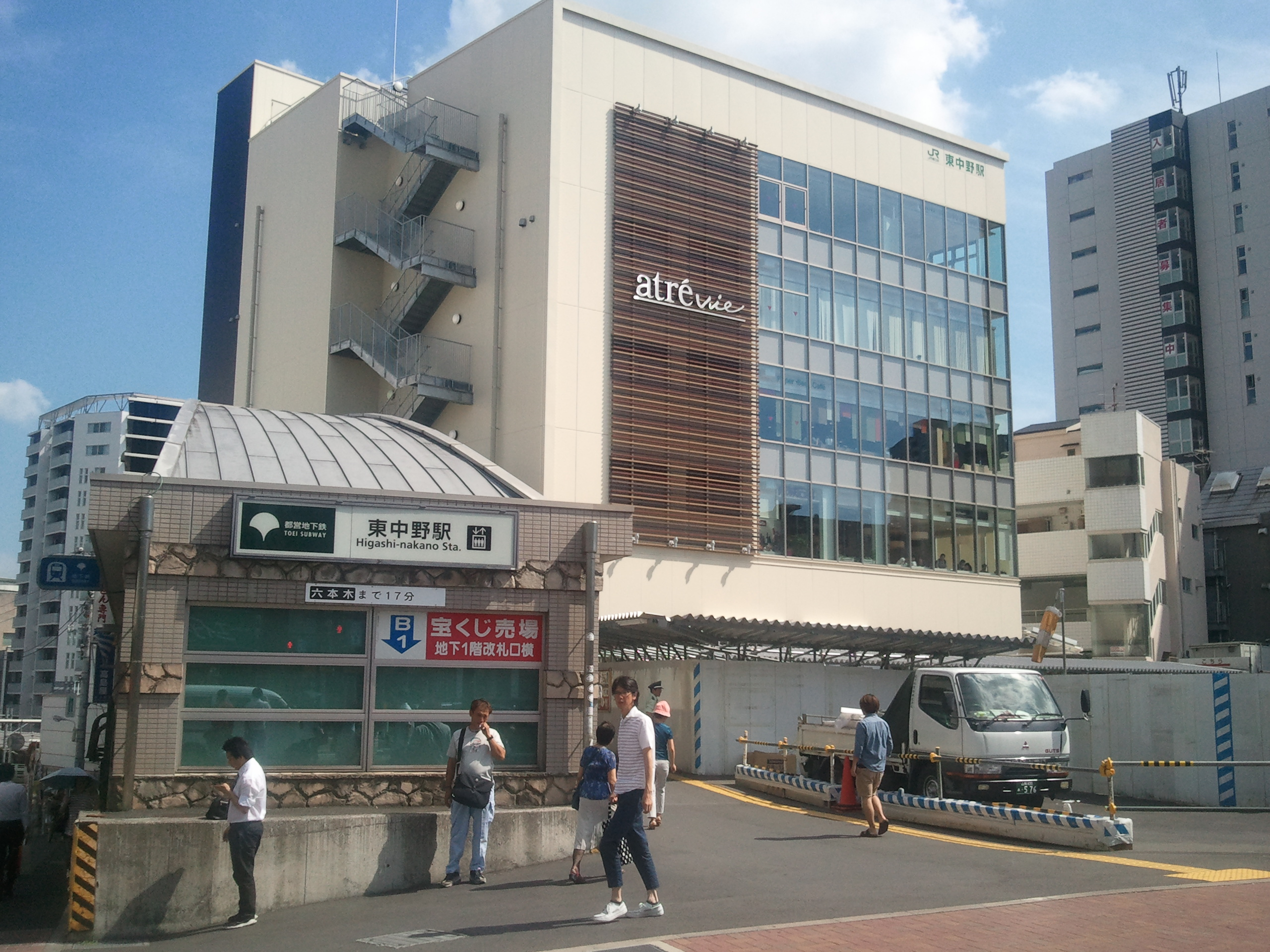
- Station building and subway entrance

General information
- Location: 1-12 Higashinakano 4-chome (JR East); 3-8-16 Higashinakano (Toei Subway); Higashi-Nakano, Nakano City, Tokyo （東京都中野区東中野） Japan
- Operator: JR East; Toei Subway
- Lines: Chūō-Sōbu Line; Ōedo Line
- Platforms: 1 island platform (JR East); 1 island platform (Toei Subway)
- Tracks: 2 (JR East); 2 (Toei Subway)
- Connections: Bus stop

Construction
- Structure type: Elevated (JR East); Underground (Toei Subway)

Other information
- Station code: E-31

History
- Opened: 14 June 1906; 120 years ago
- Former names: Kashiwagi (until 1917)

Services
| Preceding station | JR East | Following station |
|---|---|---|
| Nakano JB07 towards Mitaka | Chūō–Sōbu Line | Ōkubo JB09 towards Chiba |
| Preceding station | Toei Subway | Following station |
| Nakai towards Hikarigaoka | Ōedo Line | Nakano-Sakaue towards Tochōmae |
Location
- Location within Special wards of Tokyo Location within Tokyo Bay and Bōsō Peninsula Location within Tokyo Location within Japan

Higashi-Nakano Station (東中野駅, Higashi-Nakano-eki) is a railway station in Nakano, Tokyo, Japan, operated by East Japan Railway Company (JR East) and Tokyo Metropolitan Bureau of Transportation (Toei Subway).

== Lines ==
This station is served by the JR East Chūō-Sōbu Line and Toei Ōedo Line. The station number for the Ōedo Line is E-31.

== Platforms ==
=== JR East ===
One island platform serving two tracks.

| 1 | Chūō-Sōbu Line | for Nakano, Kichijōji, Mitaka |
| 2 | Chūō-Sōbu Line | for Shinjuku, Ochanomizu, Kinshichō, Chiba |

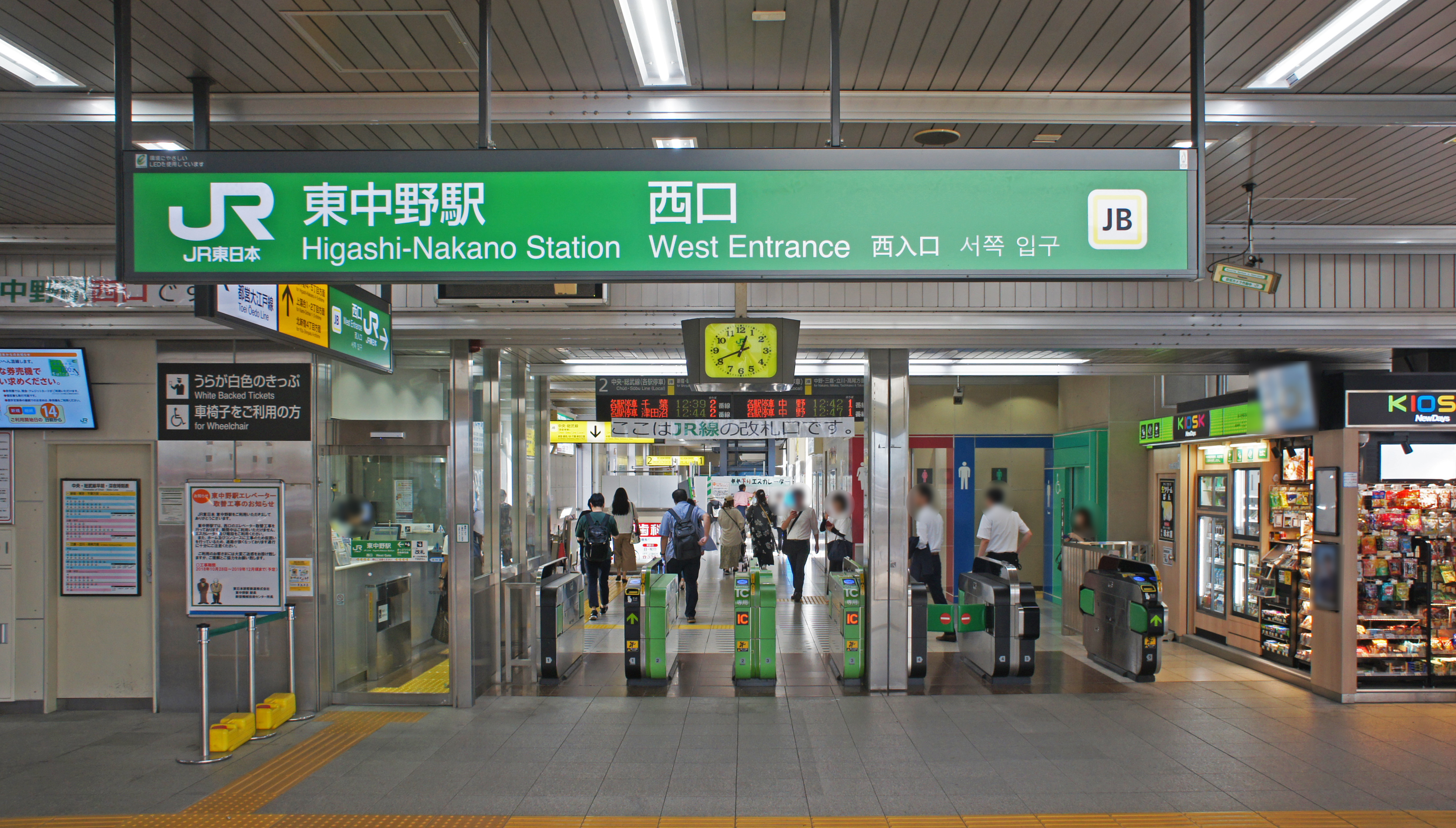
West gates, 2019

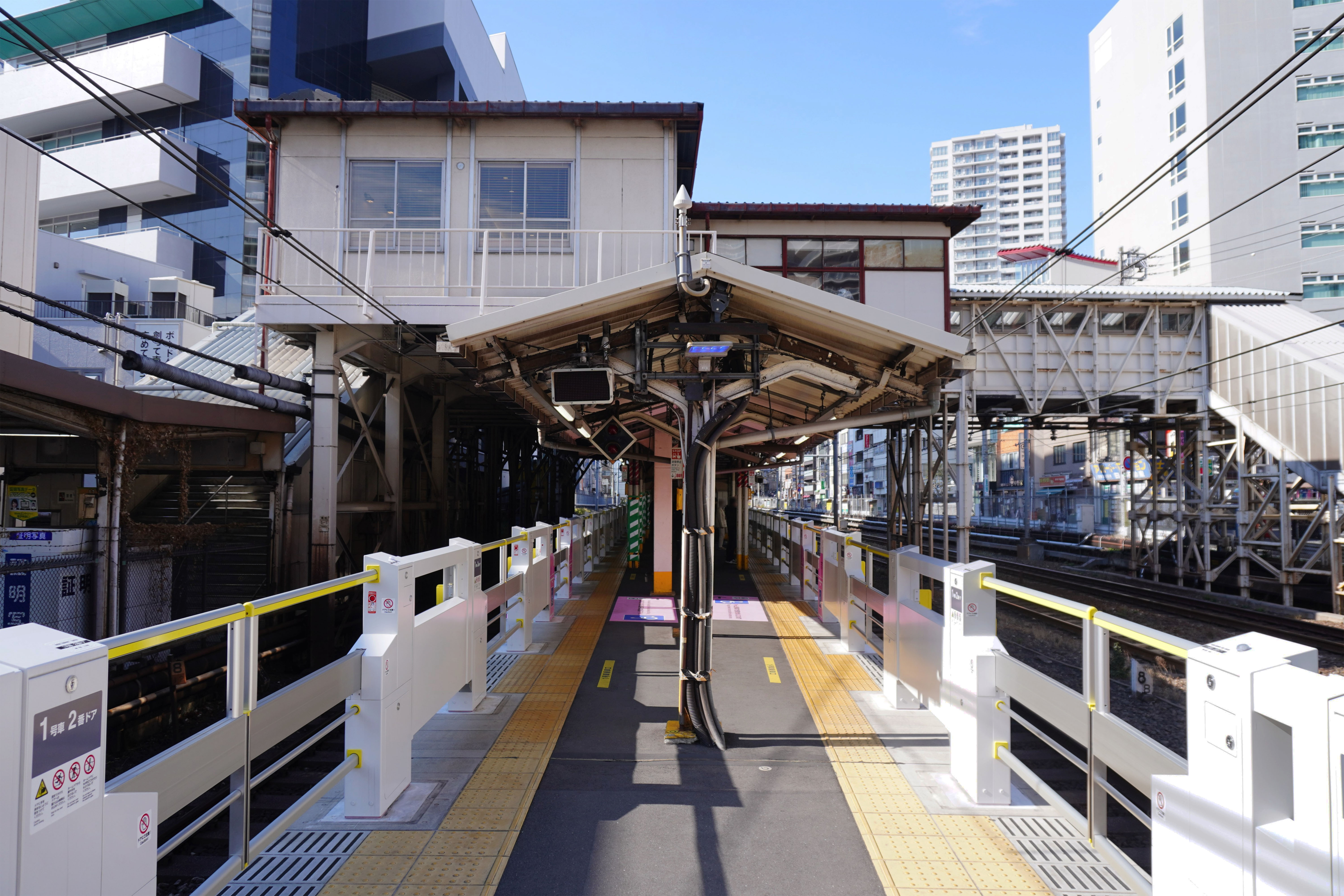
JR platforms, January 2024

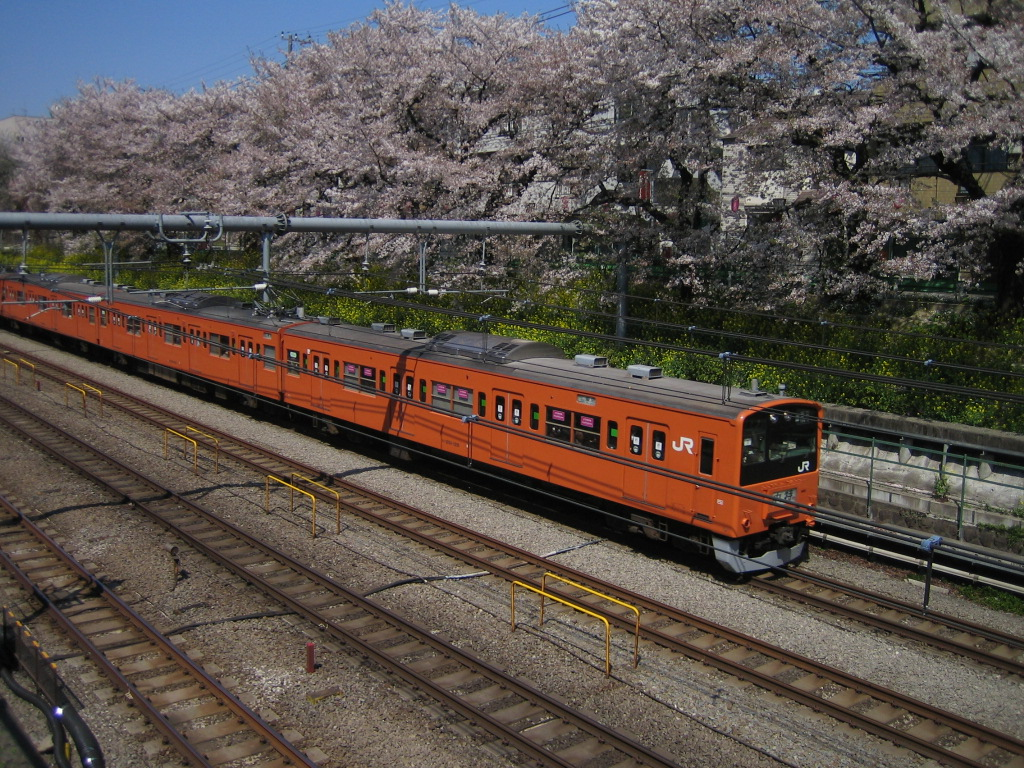
A Chuo Line Rapid 201 series train passes cherry trees alongside the bypass tracks near the station, April 2009

=== Toei ===
One island platform serving two tracks.

| 1 | Ōedo Line | for Tochōmae, Roppongi, and Daimon |
| 2 | Ōedo Line | for Nerima and Hikarigaoka |

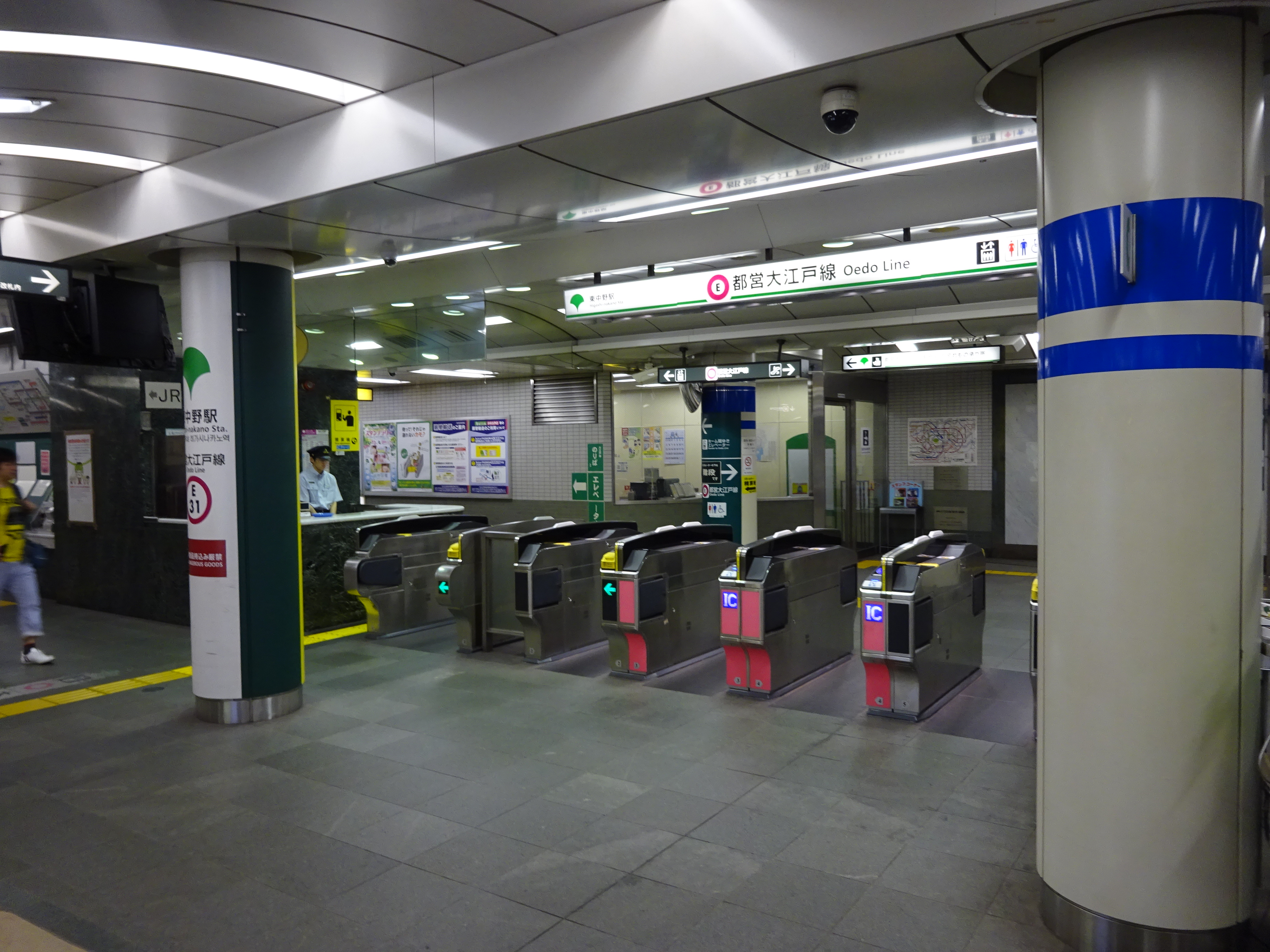
Toei gates

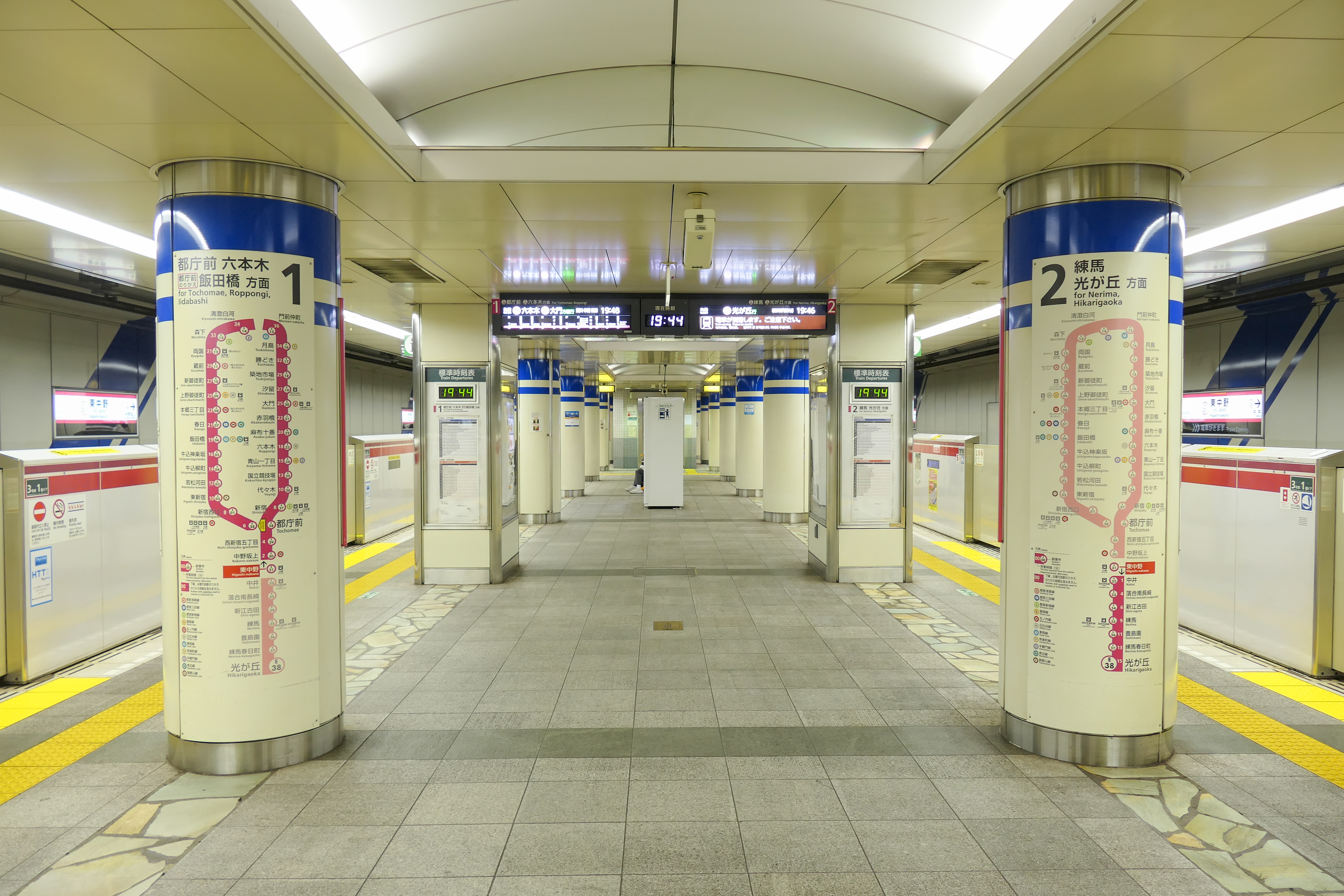
Toei platforms, December 2022

== History ==
The JR station opened on 14 June 1906 as Kashiwagi Station (柏木駅). It was renamed Higashi-Nakano in 1917. The Toei station opened on 19 December 1997.
