= Inage Station =

Railway station in Chiba, Japan

JO27 JB37 Inage Station 稲毛駅
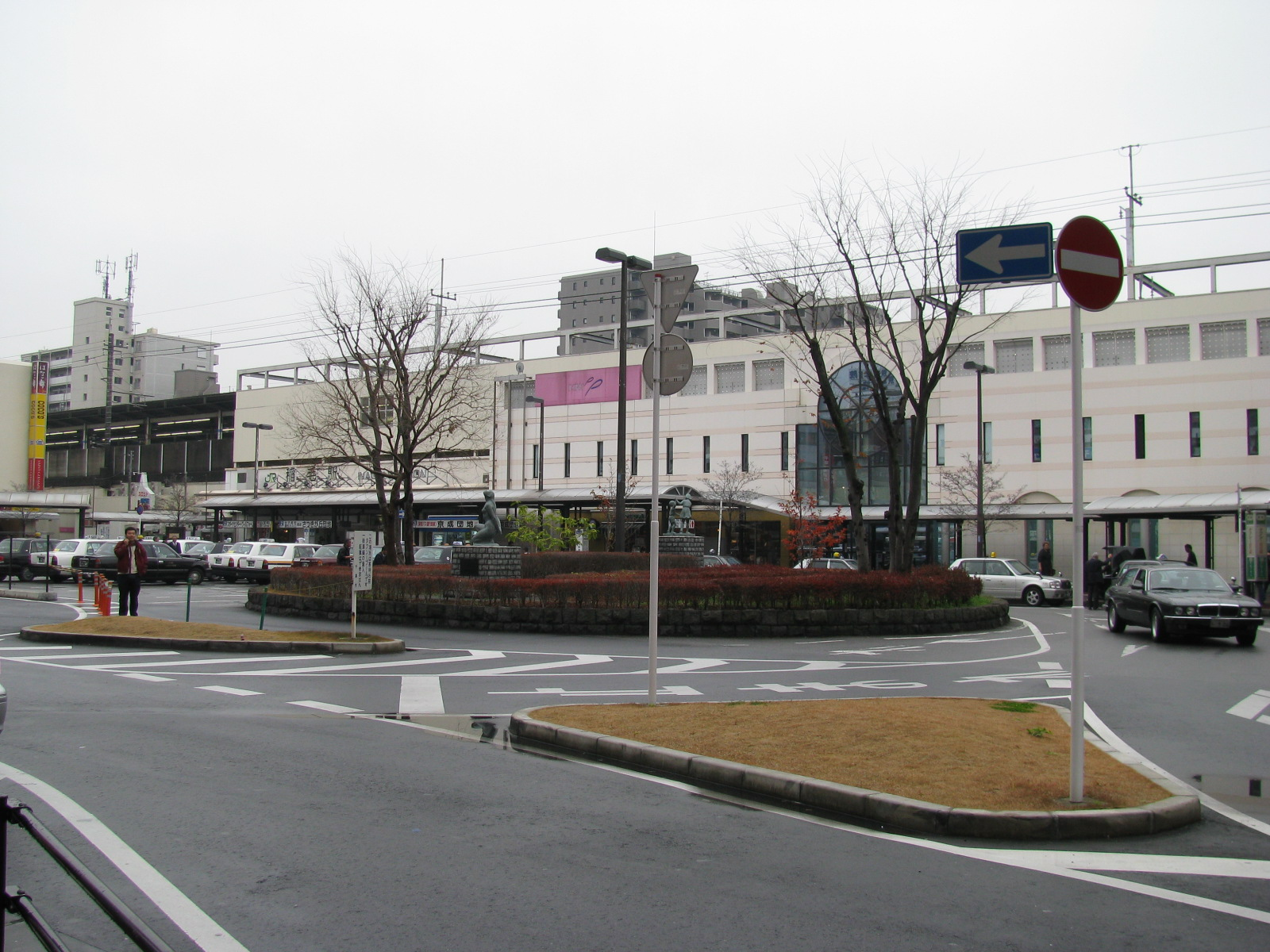
- The east side of the station in December 2007

General information
- Location: 3-chōme-19 Inagehigashi, Inage-ku, Chiba-shi, Chiba-ken, 263-0031; Japan
- Coordinates: 35°38′13.49″N 140°05′33.48″E
- Operator: JR East
- Lines: Sōbu Line (Rapid); Chūō-Sōbu Line
- Distance: 35.0 km from Tokyo
- Platforms: 2 island platforms

Other information
- Status: Staffed (Midori no Madoguchi )
- Station code: JO27 (Sōbu Line (Rapid)); JB37 (Chūō-Sōbu Line)
- Website: Official website

History
- Opened: 13 September 1899

Passengers
- FY2019: 49,966 daily

Services
Preceding station	JR East	Following station
Tsudanuma JO26 towards Tokyo	Sōbu Line Rapid	Chiba JO28 Terminus
Shin-Kemigawa JB36 towards Mitaka	Chūō–Sōbu Line	Nishi-Chiba JB38 towards Chiba
Location
- Location within Chiba Prefecture Location within Japan

Inage Station (稲毛駅, Inage-eki) is a junction passenger railway station located in Inage-ku, Chiba, Japan, operated by East Japan Railway Company (JR East).

== Lines ==
Inage Station is located on the Sōbu Main Line, 35.0 km from Tokyo Station, and is served by both Sōbu Line (Rapid) services and Chūō-Sōbu Line all-stations "Local" services.

== Station layout ==
The station consists of two elevated island platforms with the station building underneath. The station has a Midori no Madoguchi staffed ticket office and also a "View Plaza" travel agency.

=== Platforms ===
1	Chūō-Sōbu Line	for Nishi-Funabashi, Shinjuku, and Mitaka
2	Chūō-Sōbu Line	for Chiba
3	Sōbu Line (Rapid)	for Tsudanuma, Kinshicho and Tokyo; Yokosuka Line for Yokohama
4	Sōbu Line (Rapid)	for Chiba and Narita Airport (Terminal 2·3 and Terminal 1)

== History ==
The station opened on 13 September 1899. The station was absorbed into the JR East network upon the privatization of the Japan National Railways (JNR) on 1 April 1987.

== Passenger statistics ==
In fiscal 2019, the station was used by an average of 49,966 passengers daily (boarding passengers only).

== Surrounding area ==
- Inage Ward Office
- Inage Library
- Chiba City Konakadai Elementary School
- Chiba Municipal Chiba High School

== See also ==
- List of railway stations in Japan
