= Chūō-Sōbu Line =

Railway line in Japan

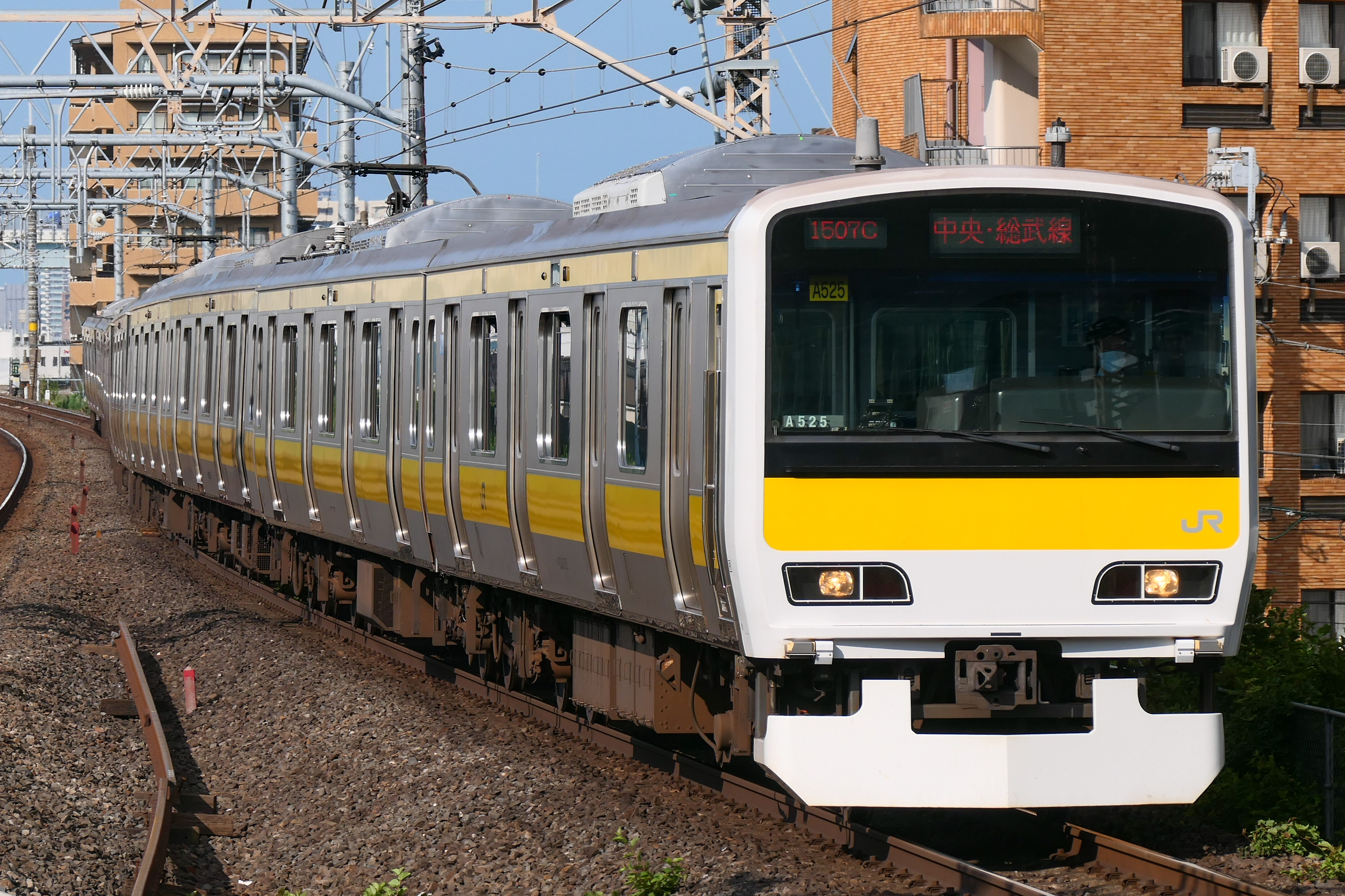
- An E231-500 series EMU on the Chuo-Sobu Line in August 2022

Overview
- Native name: 中央・総武緩行線
- Status: Operational
- Owner: JR East
- Line number: JB
- Locale: Tokyo, Chiba Prefecture
- Termini: Mitaka; Chiba
- Stations: 39
- Color on map: Yellow

Service
- Type: Commuter rail
- Depot: Mitaka
- Rolling stock: E231-0 series; E231-500 series; E231-800 series; E235-0 series (future)
- Daily ridership: 2,359,390 (2015)

History
- Opened: 1 July 1932; 94 years ago

Technical
- Line length: 60.2 km (37.4 mi)
- Track gauge: 1,067 mm (3 ft 6 in)
- Electrification: Overhead line, 1,500 V DC
Route map
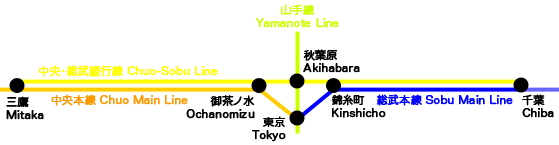

The Chūō-Sōbu Line (Japanese: 中央・総武緩行線, Hepburn: Chūō-Sōbu-kankō-sen) is a railway service that runs through Tokyo and Chiba Prefecture, Japan. Part of the East Japan Railway Company (JR East) network, the service operates on separate tracks along the right-of-way of the Chūō Main Line (Chūō Line (Rapid)) and Sōbu Main Line (Sōbu Line (Rapid)), providing continuous travel between Mitaka Station in the cities of Mitaka and Musashino and Chiba Station in Chiba.

The term Kankō (緩行, lit. "slow run") distinguishes local trains on the Chūō-Sōbu line from rapid service trains running on the Chūō Main Line between Mitaka and Ochanomizu and on the Sōbu Main Line between Kinshichō and Chiba.

== Service patterns ==
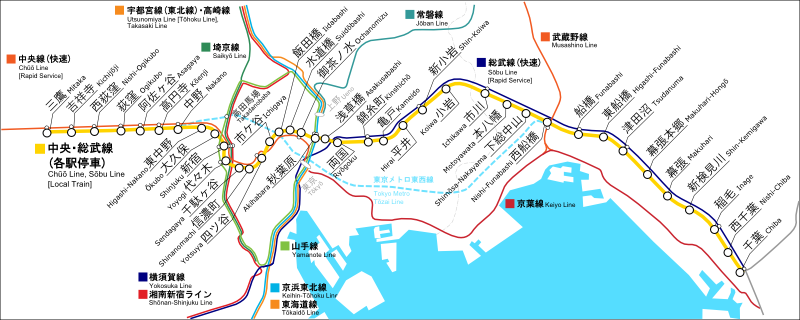

=== Chūō-Sōbu Line ===
- Regularly, trains terminate at Chiba or Tsudanuma at the east side, and terminate at Nakano or Mitaka at the west side
- All trains stop at every station.
  - For station information on the parallel rapid/express lines, see the Chūō Line (Rapid) and Sōbu Line (Rapid) articles.

=== Tōzai Line through service ===
All through service trains enter the Tōzai Line at either Nakano, or Nishi-Funabashi. These trains operate within the following routes:

- Mitaka – Nakano – (Tōzai Line) – Nishi-Funabashi – Tsudanuma (weekday mornings/evenings only)
- Nakano – (Tōzai Line) – Nishi-Funabashi – Tsudanuma (weekday mornings/evenings only)
- Mitaka – Nakano – (Tōzai Line) – Nishi-Funabashi
- Mitaka – Nakano – (Tōzai Line) – Nishi-Funabashi – (Tōyō Rapid Railway Line) – Tōyō-Katsutadai (mornings/evenings only)

=== Limited express ===
Prior to March 2024, seasonal Limited Express Shinjuku Wakashio and Shinjuku Sazanami trains stopped at Akihabara on the Chūō-Sōbu Line "mainly on weekends and holidays when service is heavy". As of March 2024, these trains no longer stop at Akihabara.

=== Former Early morning / Late night ===
At around 9 -10pm, a few westbound trains headed beyond Mitaka onto the Chūō Line (Rapid), with some terminating at Musashi-Koganei, and the others at Tachikawa. The other trains during the hour operated regularly.

At around 4 - 6am and 11pm - 1am, Chūō-Sōbu Line services were divided at Ochanomizu Station, into two sections.

- At the western section (Mitaka – Ochanomizu), Chūō Line (Rapid) trains ran through the Chūō-Sōbu Line tracks between Nakano and Ochanomizu, with services serving between Tokyo and as far as Takao, or even Ōme, which stops at all stations.
- At the eastern section (Ochanomizu – Chiba), local trains operated and terminated at the two ends of the section.

This service pattern last operated on 13 March 2020. To prepare for the eventual installation of platform doors on Chūō-Sōbu Line platforms and the future addition of Green Cars on the Rapid line, Chūō Line Rapid service trains no longer regularly operate on the Chūō-Sōbu Line tracks.

== Station list ==
Legend

- ●: All trains stop
- ■: Some trains pass
- ▲: All trains pass on weekends and holidays
- ｜: All trains pass

Line	No.	Station	Distance in km (mi)			Local		Rapid		Transfers	Location	
Line	No.	Station	Between stations	Total		Chūō-Sōbu	Tozai	Chūō	Sōbu	Transfers	Location	
Sōbu	JB39	Chiba 千葉	—N/a	From; Chiba: 0 (0)	From; Tokyo: 39.2 (24.4)	●		↑ To Tokyo	●	Sōbu Line (JO28); ■ Uchibō Line; ■ Sotobō Line; ■ Narita Line; ■ Sōbu Main Line; Chiba Line (Keisei Chiba: KS59); Chiba Urban Monorail (CM03)	Chūō-ku, Chiba	Chiba
Sōbu	JB38	Nishi-Chiba 西千葉	1.4 (0.87)		37.8 (23.5)	●		↑ To Tokyo	｜		Chūō-ku, Chiba	Chiba
Sōbu	JB37	Inage 稲毛	1.9 (1.2)	3.3 (2.1)	35.9 (22.3)	●		↑ To Tokyo	●	Sōbu Line (JO27)	Inage-ku, Chiba	Chiba
Sōbu	JB36	Shin-Kemigawa 新検見川	2.7 (1.7)	6.0 (3.7)	33.2 (20.6)	●		↑ To Tokyo	｜		Hanamigawa-ku, Chiba	Chiba
Sōbu	JB35	Makuhari 幕張	1.6 (0.99)	7.6 (4.7)	31.6 (19.6)	●		↑ To Tokyo	｜	Chiba Line (Keisei Makuhari: KS53)	Hanamigawa-ku, Chiba	Chiba
Sōbu	JB34	Makuharihongō 幕張本郷	2.0 (1.2)	9.6 (6.0)	29.6 (18.4)	●		↑ To Tokyo	｜	Chiba Line (Keisei Makuharihongō: KS52)	Hanamigawa-ku, Chiba	Chiba
Sōbu	JB33	Tsudanuma 津田沼	2.9 (1.8)	12.5 (7.8)	26.7 (16.6)	●	●	↑ To Tokyo	●	Sōbu Line (JO26); Matsudo Line (Shin-Tsudanuma: KS66)	Narashino	Chiba
Sōbu	JB32	Higashi-Funabashi 東船橋	1.7 (1.1)	14.2 (8.8)	25.0 (15.5)	●	●	↑ To Tokyo	｜		Funabashi	Chiba
Sōbu	JB31	Funabashi 船橋	1.8 (1.1)	16.0 (9.9)	23.2 (14.4)	●	●	↑ To Tokyo	●	Sōbu Line (JO25); Tōbu Urban Park Line (TD35); Main Line (Keisei Funabashi: KS22)	Funabashi	Chiba
Sōbu	JB30	Nishi-Funabashi 西船橋	2.6 (1.6)	18.6 (11.6)	20.6 (12.8)	●	●	↑ To Tokyo	｜	Musashino Line (JM10); Keiyō Line (JM10); Tōzai Line (T-23; some trains through to Tsudanuma); Tōyō Rapid Railway Line (TR01)	Funabashi	Chiba
Sōbu	JB29	Shimōsa-Nakayama 下総中山	1.6 (0.99)	20.2 (12.6)	19.0 (11.8)	●	Through to Tōzai Line	↑ To Tokyo	｜		Funabashi	Chiba
Sōbu	JB28	Moto-Yawata 本八幡	1.6 (0.99)	21.8 (13.5)	17.4 (10.8)	●	Through to Tōzai Line	↑ To Tokyo	｜	Shinjuku Line (S-21)	Ichikawa	Chiba
Sōbu	JB27	Ichikawa 市川	2.0 (1.2)	23.8 (14.8)	15.4 (9.6)	●	Through to Tōzai Line	↑ To Tokyo	●	Sōbu Line (JO24)	Ichikawa	Chiba
Sōbu	JB26	Koiwa 小岩	2.6 (1.6)	26.4 (16.4)	12.8 (8.0)	●	Through to Tōzai Line	↑ To Tokyo	｜		Edogawa	Tokyo
Sōbu	JB25	Shin-Koiwa 新小岩	2.8 (1.7)	29.2 (18.1)	10.0 (6.2)	●	Through to Tōzai Line	↑ To Tokyo	●	Sōbu Line (JO23)	Katsushika	Tokyo
Sōbu	JB24	Hirai 平井	1.8 (1.1)	31.0 (19.3)	8.2 (5.1)	●	Through to Tōzai Line	↑ To Tokyo	｜		Edogawa	Tokyo
Sōbu	JB23	Kameido 亀戸	1.9 (1.2)	32.9 (20.4)	6.3 (3.9)	●	Through to Tōzai Line	↑ To Tokyo	｜	Kameido Line (TS44)	Kōtō	Tokyo
Sōbu	JB22	Kinshichō 錦糸町	1.5 (0.93)	34.4 (21.4)	4.8 (3.0)	●	Through to Tōzai Line	↑ To Tokyo	●	Sōbu Line (JO22; for Tokyo, Zushi, Kurihama); Hanzōmon Line (Z-13)	Sumida	Tokyo
Sōbu Branch	JB22	Kinshichō 錦糸町	1.5 (0.93)	34.4 (21.4)	From; Kinshichō: 0 (0)	●	Through to Tōzai Line	↑ To Tokyo	●	Sōbu Line (JO22; for Tokyo, Zushi, Kurihama); Hanzōmon Line (Z-13)	Sumida	Tokyo
Sōbu Branch	JB21	Ryōgoku 両国	1.5 (0.93)	35.9 (22.3)	1.5 (0.93)	●	Through to Tōzai Line	↑ To Tokyo	To Tokyo and Yokosuka Line ↓	Ōedo Line (E-12)	Sumida	Tokyo
Sōbu Branch	JB20	Asakusabashi 浅草橋	0.8 (0.50)	36.7 (22.8)	2.3 (1.4)	●	Through to Tōzai Line	↑ To Tokyo	To Tokyo and Yokosuka Line ↓	Asakusa Line (A-16)	Taitō	Tokyo
Sōbu Branch		Akihabara 秋葉原	1.1 (0.68)	37.8 (23.5)	3.4 (2.1)	●	Through to Tōzai Line	↑ To Tokyo	To Tokyo and Yokosuka Line ↓	Yamanote Line (JY03); Keihin–Tōhoku Line (JK28); Hibiya Line (H-16); Tsukuba Express (TX01); Shinjuku Line (Iwamotocho: S-08)	Chiyoda	Tokyo
Sōbu Branch	JB18	Ochanomizu 御茶ノ水	0.9 (0.56)	38.7 (24.0)	4.3 (2.7)	●	Through to Tōzai Line	●	To Tokyo and Yokosuka Line ↓	Chūō Line (JC03; for Tokyo); Marunouchi Line (M-20); Chiyoda Line (Shin-ochanomizu: C-12)	Chiyoda	Tokyo
Chūō	JB18	Ochanomizu 御茶ノ水	0.9 (0.56)	38.7 (24.0)	From; Tokyo: 2.6 (1.6)	●	Through to Tōzai Line	●	To Tokyo and Yokosuka Line ↓	Chūō Line (JC03; for Tokyo); Marunouchi Line (M-20); Chiyoda Line (Shin-ochanomizu: C-12)	Chiyoda	Tokyo
Chūō	JB17	Suidōbashi 水道橋	0.8 (0.50)	39.5 (24.5)	3.4 (2.1)	●	Through to Tōzai Line	｜	To Tokyo and Yokosuka Line ↓	Mita Line (I-11)	Chiyoda	Tokyo
Chūō	JB16	Iidabashi 飯田橋	1.1 (0.68)	40.6 (25.2)	4.5 (2.8)	●	Through to Tōzai Line	｜	To Tokyo and Yokosuka Line ↓	Tōzai Line (T-06); Yūrakuchō Line (Y-13); Namboku Line (N-10); Ōedo Line (E-06)	Chiyoda	Tokyo
Chūō	JB15	Ichigaya 市ケ谷	1.3 (0.81)	41.9 (26.0)	5.8 (3.6)	●	Through to Tōzai Line	｜	To Tokyo and Yokosuka Line ↓	Yūrakuchō Line (Y-14); Namboku Line (N-09); Shinjuku Line (S-04)	Chiyoda	Tokyo
Chūō	JB14	Yotsuya 四ツ谷	0.8 (0.50)	42.7 (26.5)	6.6 (4.1)	●	Through to Tōzai Line	●	To Tokyo and Yokosuka Line ↓	Chūō Line (JC04); Marunouchi Line (M-12); Namboku Line (N-08)	Shinjuku	Tokyo
Chūō	JB13	Shinanomachi 信濃町	1.3 (0.81)	44.0 (27.3)	7.9 (4.9)	●	Through to Tōzai Line	｜	To Tokyo and Yokosuka Line ↓		Shinjuku	Tokyo
Chūō	JB12	Sendagaya 千駄ケ谷	0.7 (0.43)	44.7 (27.8)	8.6 (5.3)	●	Through to Tōzai Line	｜	To Tokyo and Yokosuka Line ↓	Ōedo Line (Kokuritsu-kyogijo: E-25)	Shibuya	Tokyo
Chūō	JB11	Yoyogi 代々木	1.0 (0.62)	45.7 (28.4)	9.6 (6.0)	●	Through to Tōzai Line	｜	To Tokyo and Yokosuka Line ↓	Yamanote Line (JY18); Ōedo Line (E-26)	Shibuya	Tokyo
Yamanote	JB11	Yoyogi 代々木	1.0 (0.62)	45.7 (28.4)	9.6 (6.0)	●	Through to Tōzai Line	｜	To Tokyo and Yokosuka Line ↓	Yamanote Line (JY18); Ōedo Line (E-26)	Shibuya	Tokyo
Yamanote		Shinjuku 新宿	0.7 (0.43)	46.4 (28.8)	10.3 (6.4)	●	Through to Tōzai Line	●	To Tokyo and Yokosuka Line ↓	Chūō Line (JC05); Yamanote Line (JY17); Saikyō Line (JA11); Shōnan–Shinjuku Line (JS20); Odawara Line (OH01); Keiō Line/Keiō New Line (KO01); Marunouchi Line (M-08); Shinjuku Line (S-01); Ōedo Line (E-27, Shinjuku-nishiguchi: E-01); Seibu Shinjuku Line (Seibu-Shinjuku: SS01)	Shinjuku	Tokyo
Chūō		Shinjuku 新宿	0.7 (0.43)	46.4 (28.8)	10.3 (6.4)	●	Through to Tōzai Line	●	To Tokyo and Yokosuka Line ↓	Chūō Line (JC05); Yamanote Line (JY17); Saikyō Line (JA11); Shōnan–Shinjuku Line (JS20); Odawara Line (OH01); Keiō Line/Keiō New Line (KO01); Marunouchi Line (M-08); Shinjuku Line (S-01); Ōedo Line (E-27, Shinjuku-nishiguchi: E-01); Seibu Shinjuku Line (Seibu-Shinjuku: SS01)	Shinjuku	Tokyo
Chūō	JB09	Ōkubo 大久保	1.4 (0.87)	47.8 (29.7)	11.7 (7.3)	●	Through to Tōzai Line	｜	To Tokyo and Yokosuka Line ↓	Yamanote Line (Shin-Ōkubo: JY16)	Shinjuku	Tokyo
Chūō	JB08	Higashi-Nakano 東中野	1.1 (0.68)	48.9 (30.4)	12.8 (8.0)	●	Through to Tōzai Line	｜	To Tokyo and Yokosuka Line ↓	Ōedo Line (E-31)	Nakano	Tokyo
Chūō	JB07	Nakano 中野	1.9 (1.2)	50.8 (31.6)	14.7 (9.1)	●	●	■	To Tokyo and Yokosuka Line ↓	Chūō Line (JC06); Tōzai Line (T-01; some trains through to Mitaka)	Nakano	Tokyo
Chūō	JB06	Kōenji 高円寺	1.4 (0.87)	52.2 (32.4)	16.1 (10.0)	●	●	▲	To Tokyo and Yokosuka Line ↓	Chūō Line (JC07)	Suginami	Tokyo
Chūō	JB05	Asagaya 阿佐ケ谷	1.2 (0.75)	53.4 (33.2)	17.3 (10.7)	●	●	▲	To Tokyo and Yokosuka Line ↓	Chūō Line (JC08)	Suginami	Tokyo
Chūō	JB04	Ogikubo 荻窪	1.4 (0.87)	54.8 (34.1)	18.7 (11.6)	●	●	■	To Tokyo and Yokosuka Line ↓	Chūō Line (JC09); Marunouchi Line (M-01)	Suginami	Tokyo
Chūō	JB03	Nishi-Ogikubo 西荻窪	1.9 (1.2)	56.7 (35.2)	20.6 (12.8)	●	●	▲	To Tokyo and Yokosuka Line ↓	Chūō Line (JC10)	Suginami	Tokyo
Chūō	JB02	Kichijōji 吉祥寺	1.9 (1.2)	58.6 (36.4)	22.5 (14.0)	●	●	■	To Tokyo and Yokosuka Line ↓	Chūō Line (JC11); Inokashira Line (IN17)	Musashino	Tokyo
Chūō	JB01	Mitaka 三鷹	1.6 (0.99)	60.2 (37.4)	24.1 (15.0)	●	●	■	To Tokyo and Yokosuka Line ↓	Chūō Line (JC12; for Takao)	Mitaka	Tokyo

== Rolling stock ==
=== Chūō-Sōbu Line ===
Trains used on the line are based at Mitaka Depot.

- E231-0 series 10-car EMUs (yellow stripe) (since February 2000)
- E231-500 series 10-car EMUs (yellow stripe) (since 1 December 2014)

=== Tozai Line - Toyo Rapid Line through service ===
Trains run between Mitaka and Tsudanuma (Chūō-Sōbu Line) or Toyo-Katsutadai (Toyo Rapid Line), all via the Tokyo Metro Tozai Line between Nakano and Nishi-Funabashi.

- E231-800 series 10-car EMUs (light blue and blue stripe) (Does not run on the Toyo Rapid Line)
- Tokyo Metro 05 series 10-car EMUs (light blue stripe)
- Tokyo Metro 07 series 10-car EMUs (light blue stripe)
- Tokyo Metro 15000 series 10-car EMUs (light blue stripe)
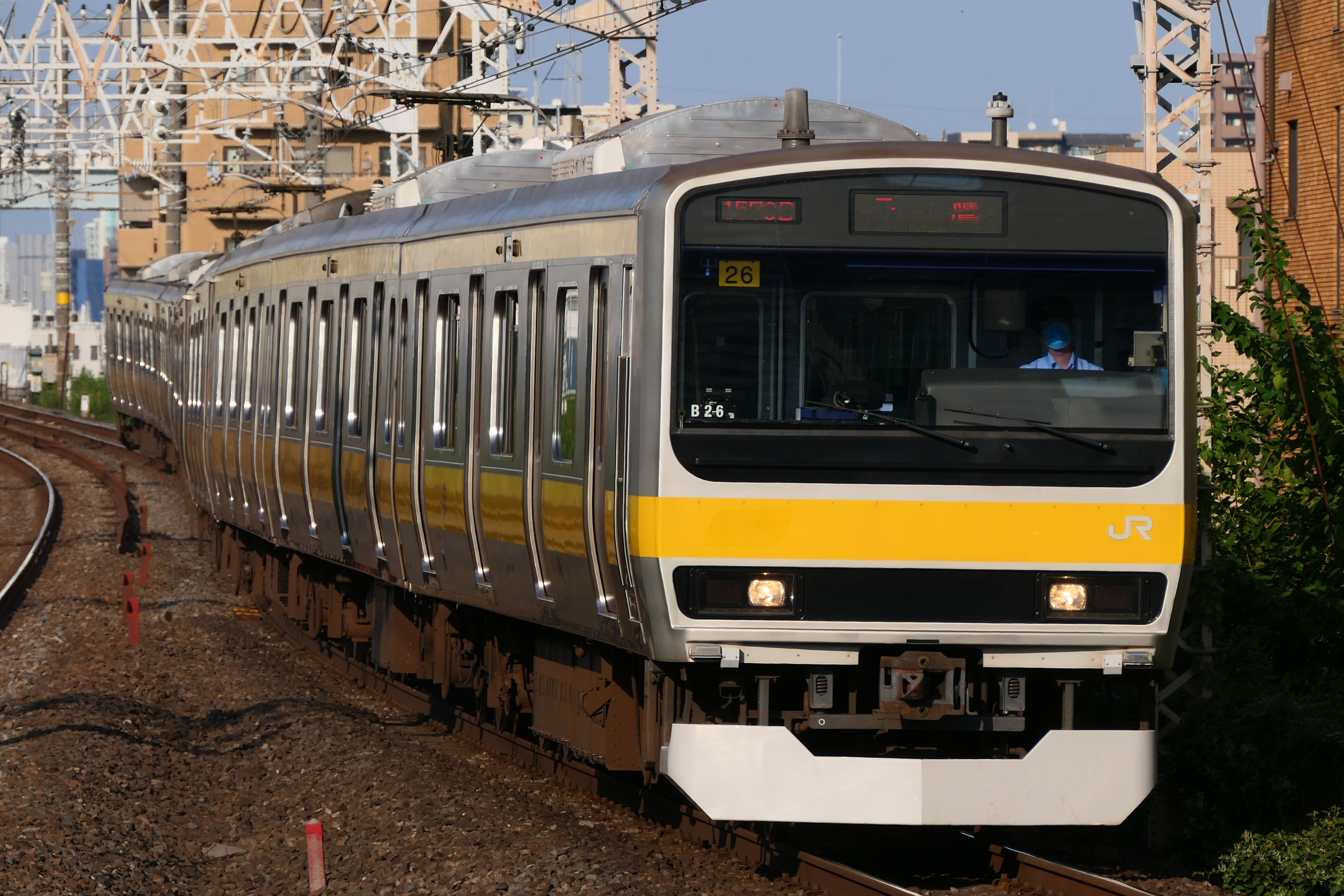
JR East E231-0 series

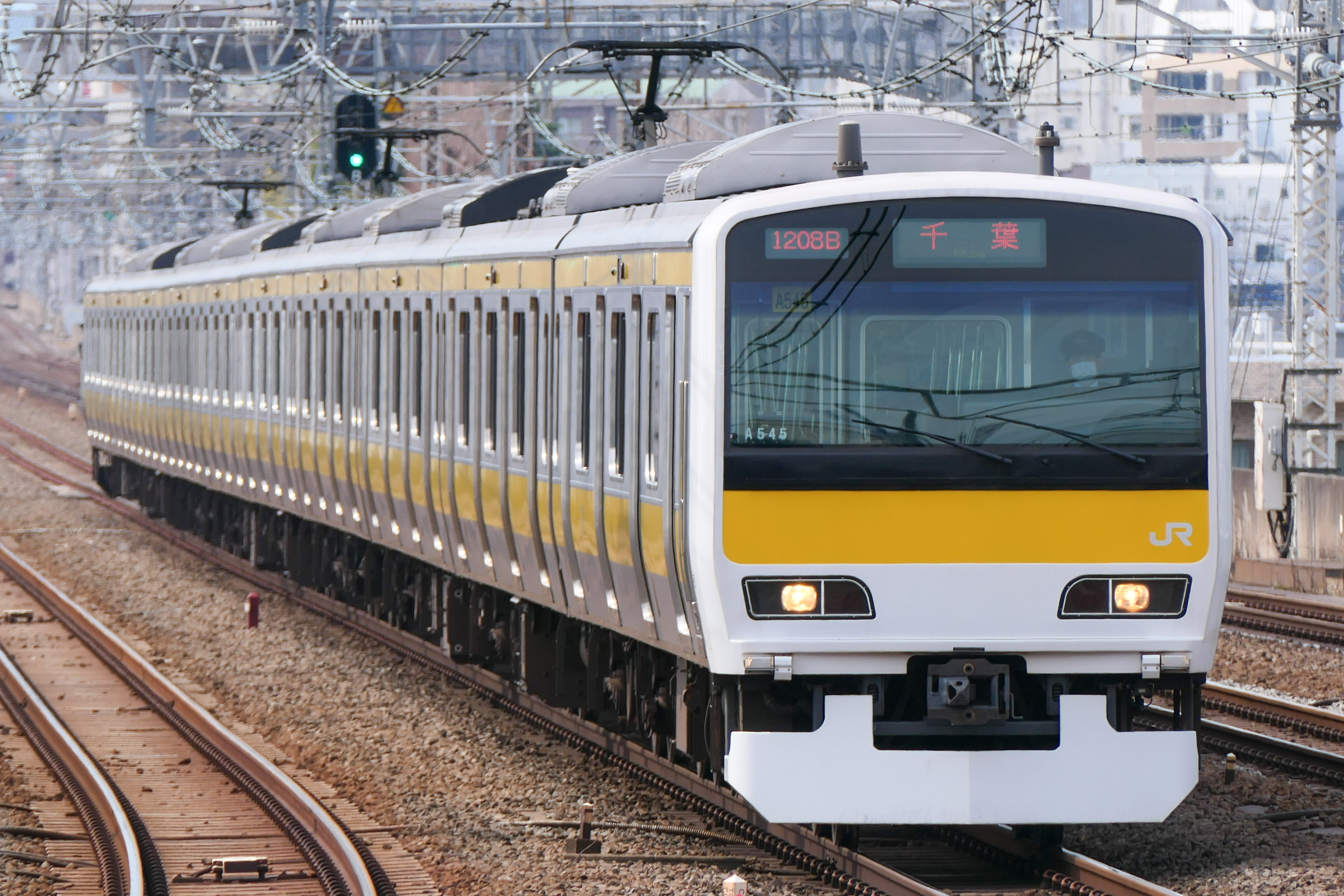
JR East E231-500 series

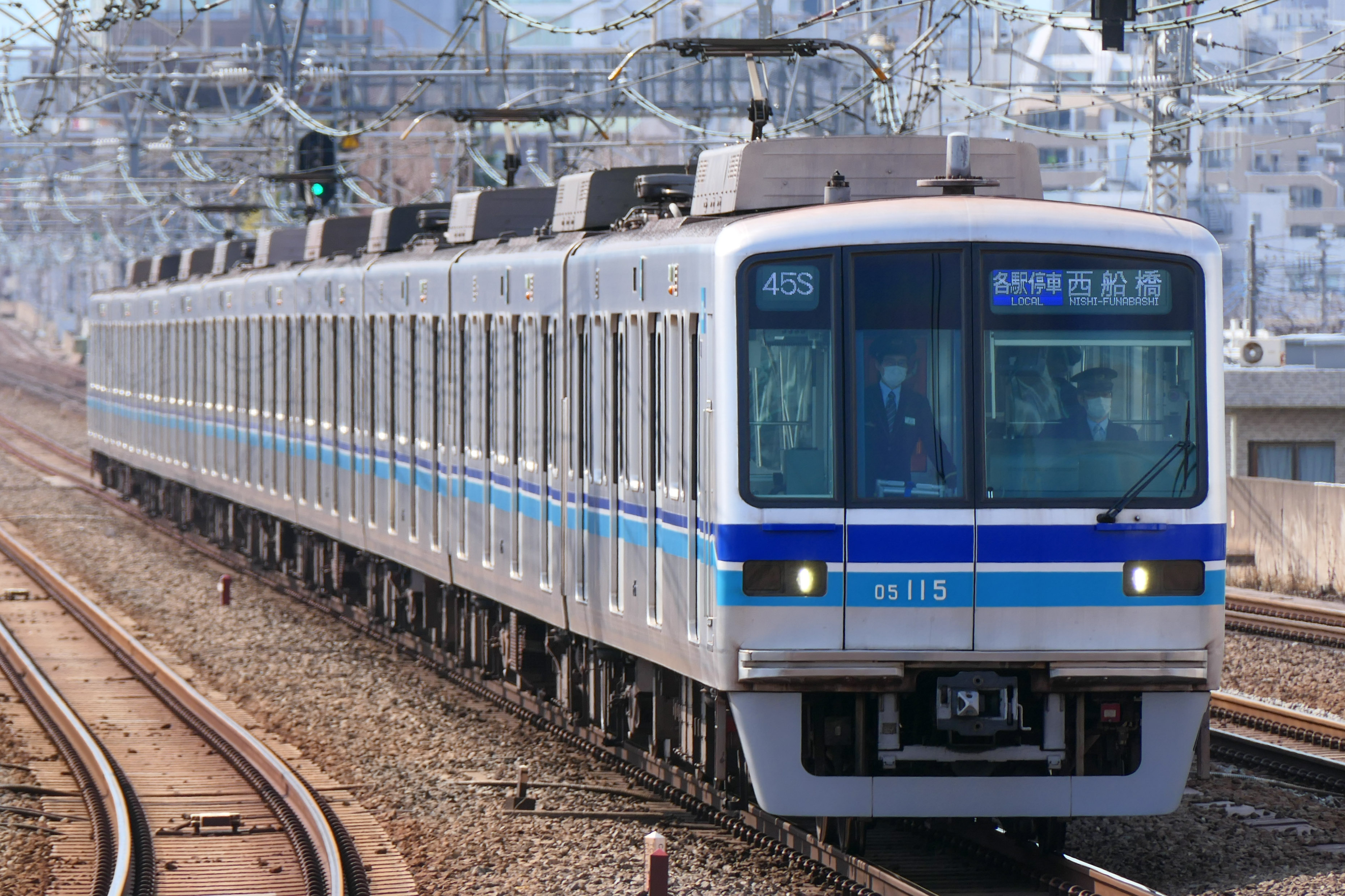
Tokyo Metro 05 series

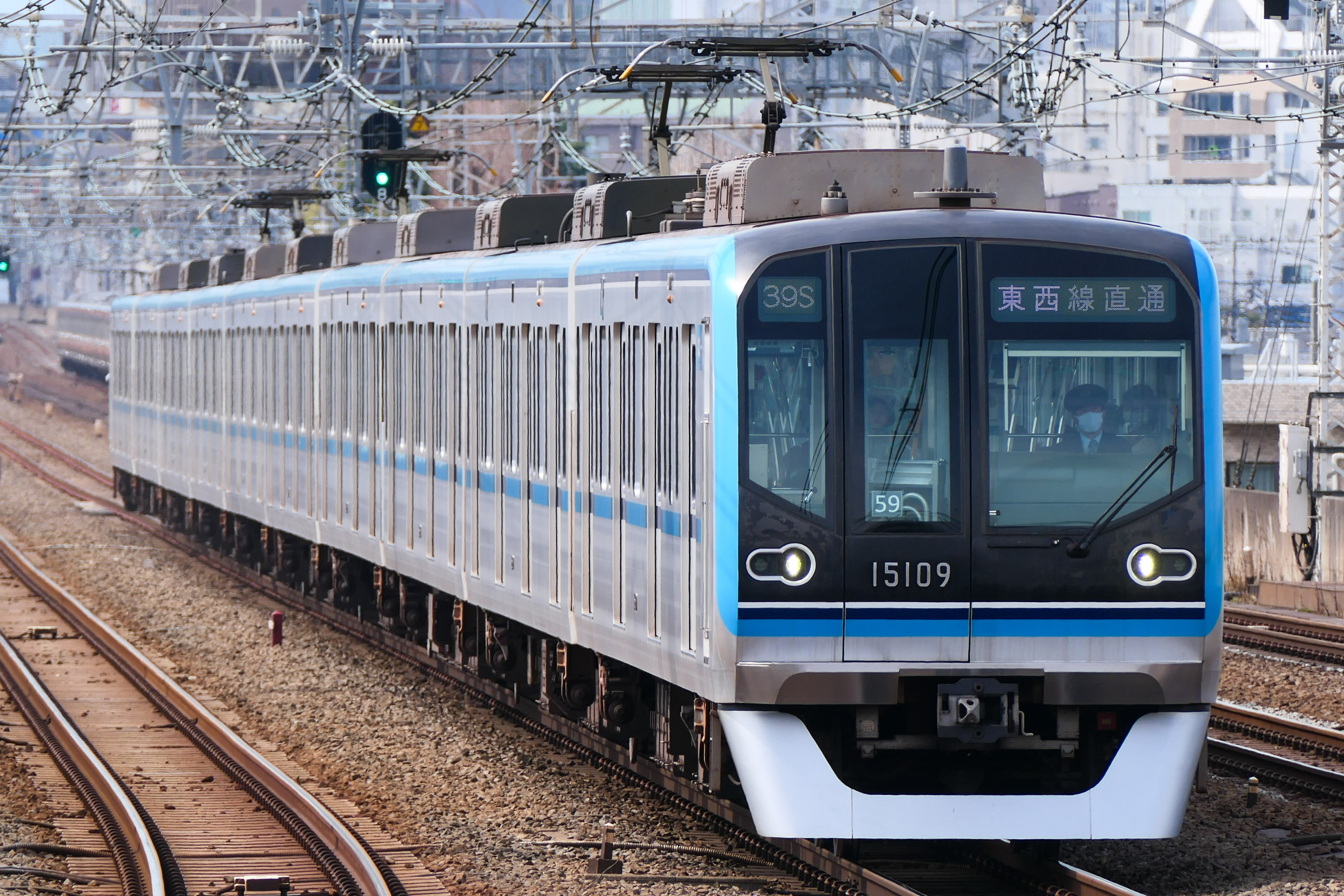
Tokyo Metro 15000 series

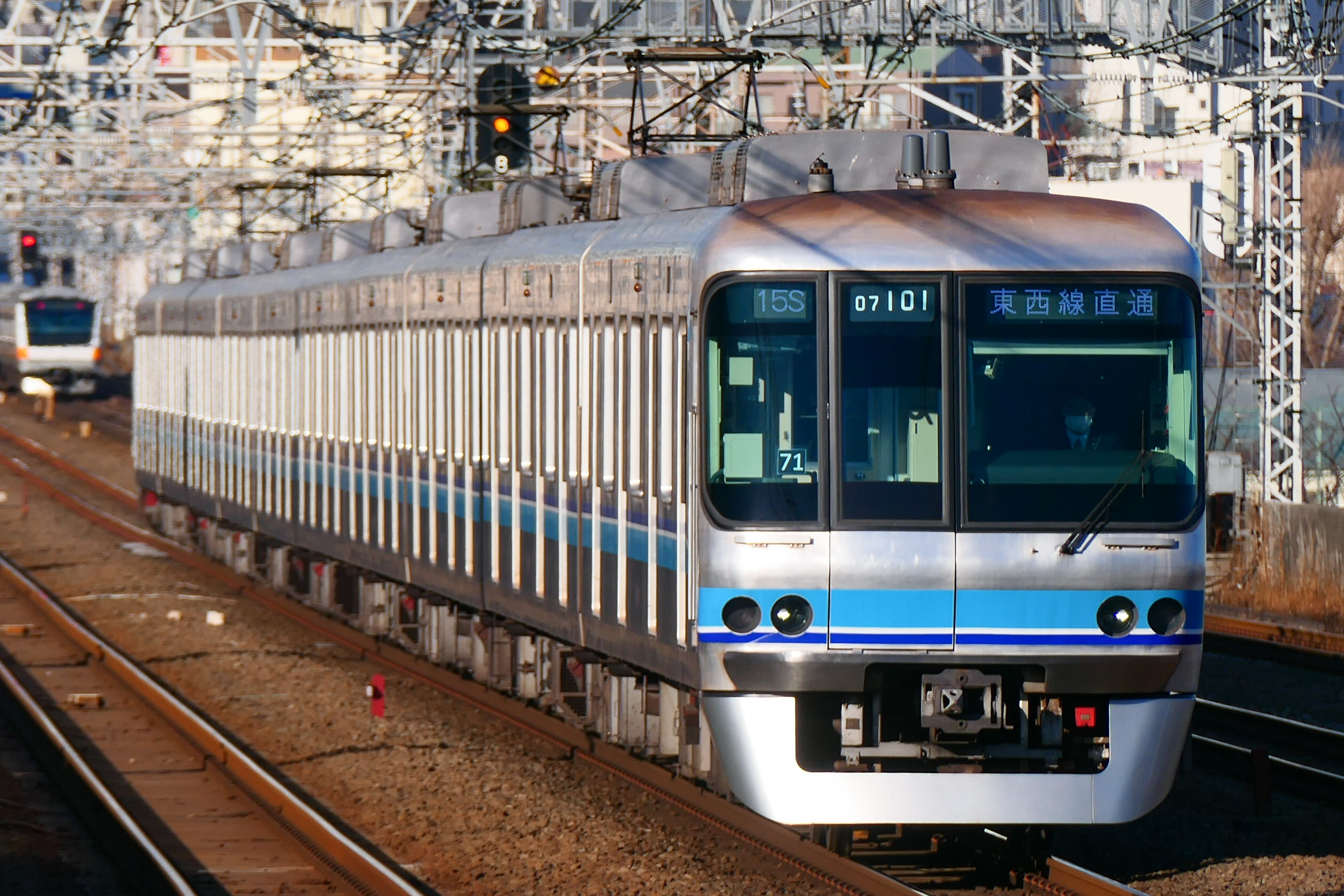
Tokyo Metro 07 series

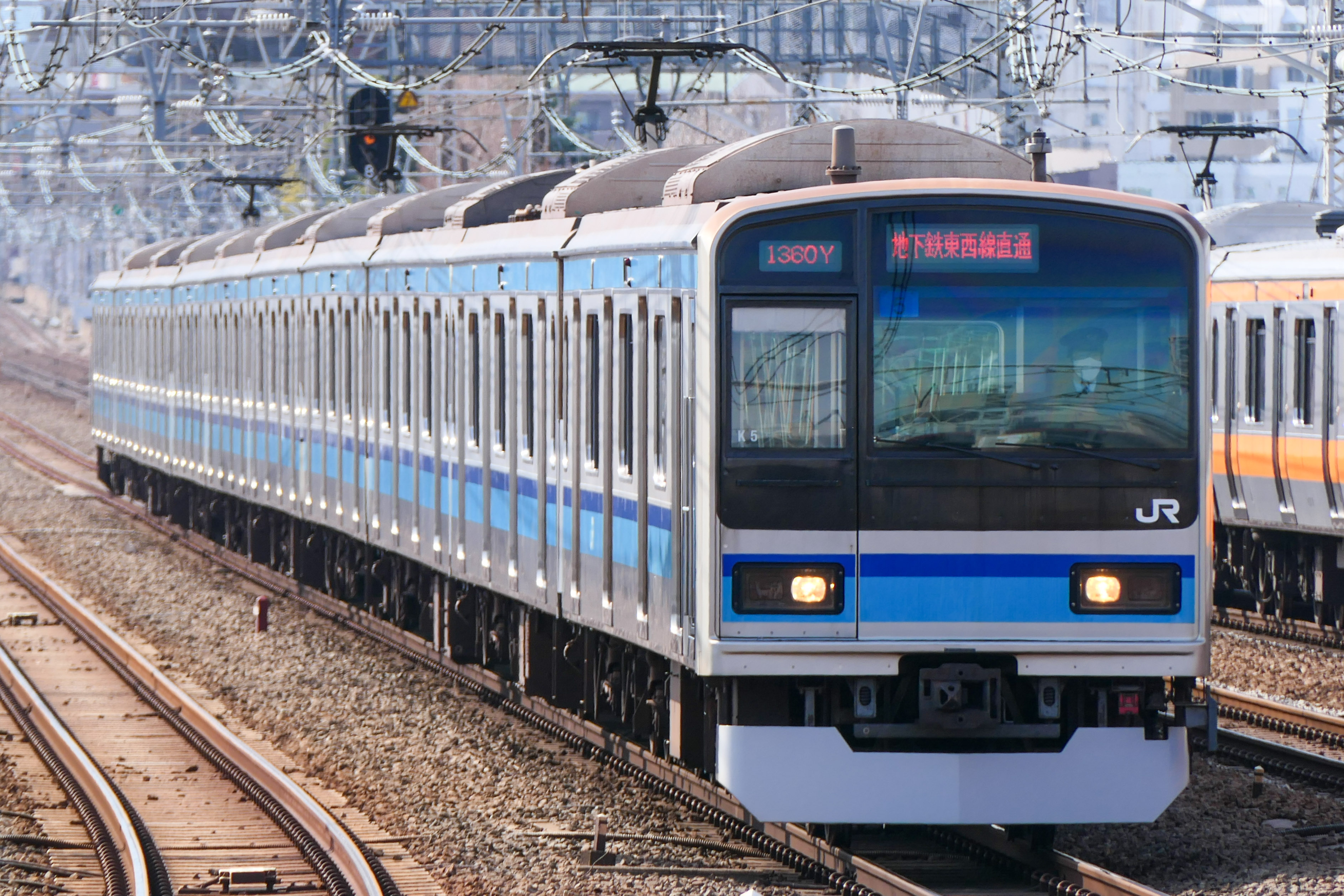
JR East E231-800 series

=== Former rolling stock ===
==== Chūō-Sōbu Line ====
- 101 series EMUs (yellow livery) (from 1963 until November 1988)
- 103 series 10-car EMUs (yellow livery) (from 1979 until March 2001)
- 201 series 10-car EMUs (yellow livery) (from 1982 until November 2001)
- 205 series 10-car EMUs (yellow stripe) (from August 1989 until November 2001)
- 209-500 series 10-car EMUs (yellow stripe) (from December 1998 until 19 April 2019)
- E231-900 series 10-car EMU (yellow stripe) (from 27 March 1999 as 209-950 series, until 25 February 2020)

==== Tozai Line - Toyo Rapid Line through service ====
- 301 series 10-car EMUs (light blue stripe) (on Tozai Line inter-running services from 1966 until 2003)

==== Chūō Line (Early morning / Late night) ====
- See Chūō Line (Rapid)#Rolling stock for the train types which operated this service until 13 March 2020.
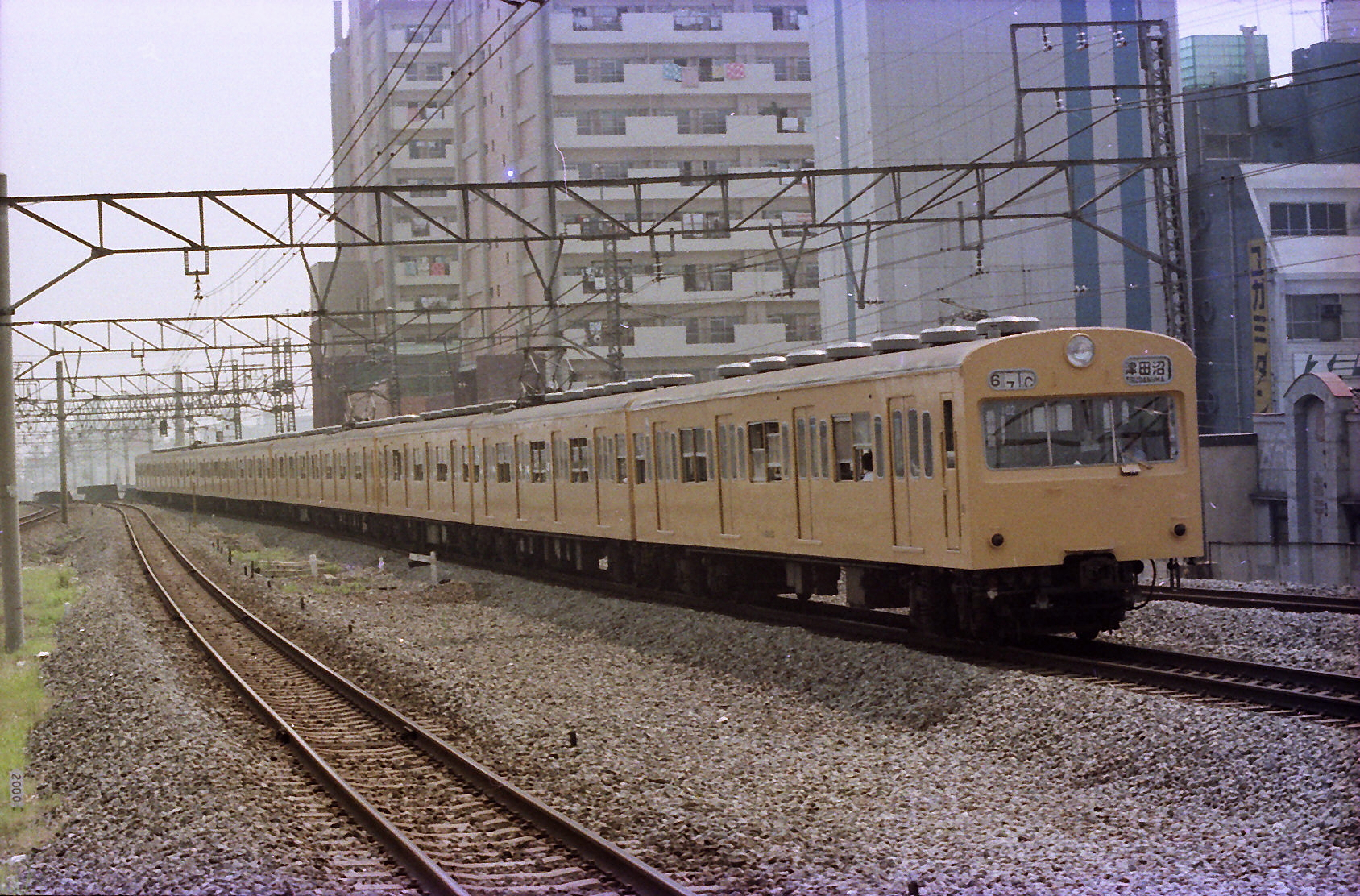
A Chūō-Sōbu Line 101 series EMU in August 1978

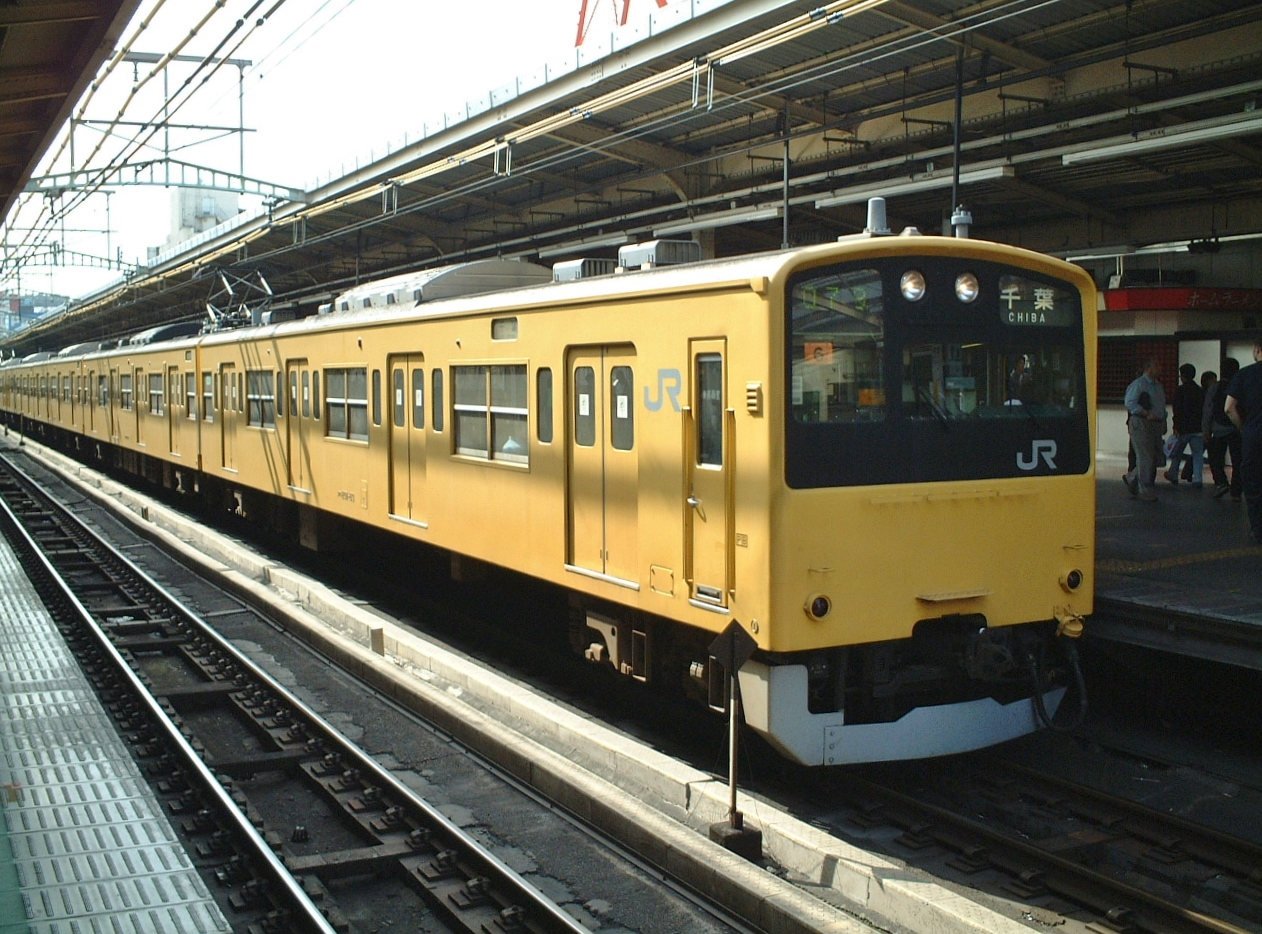
A Chūō-Sōbu Line 201 series EMU in May 2001

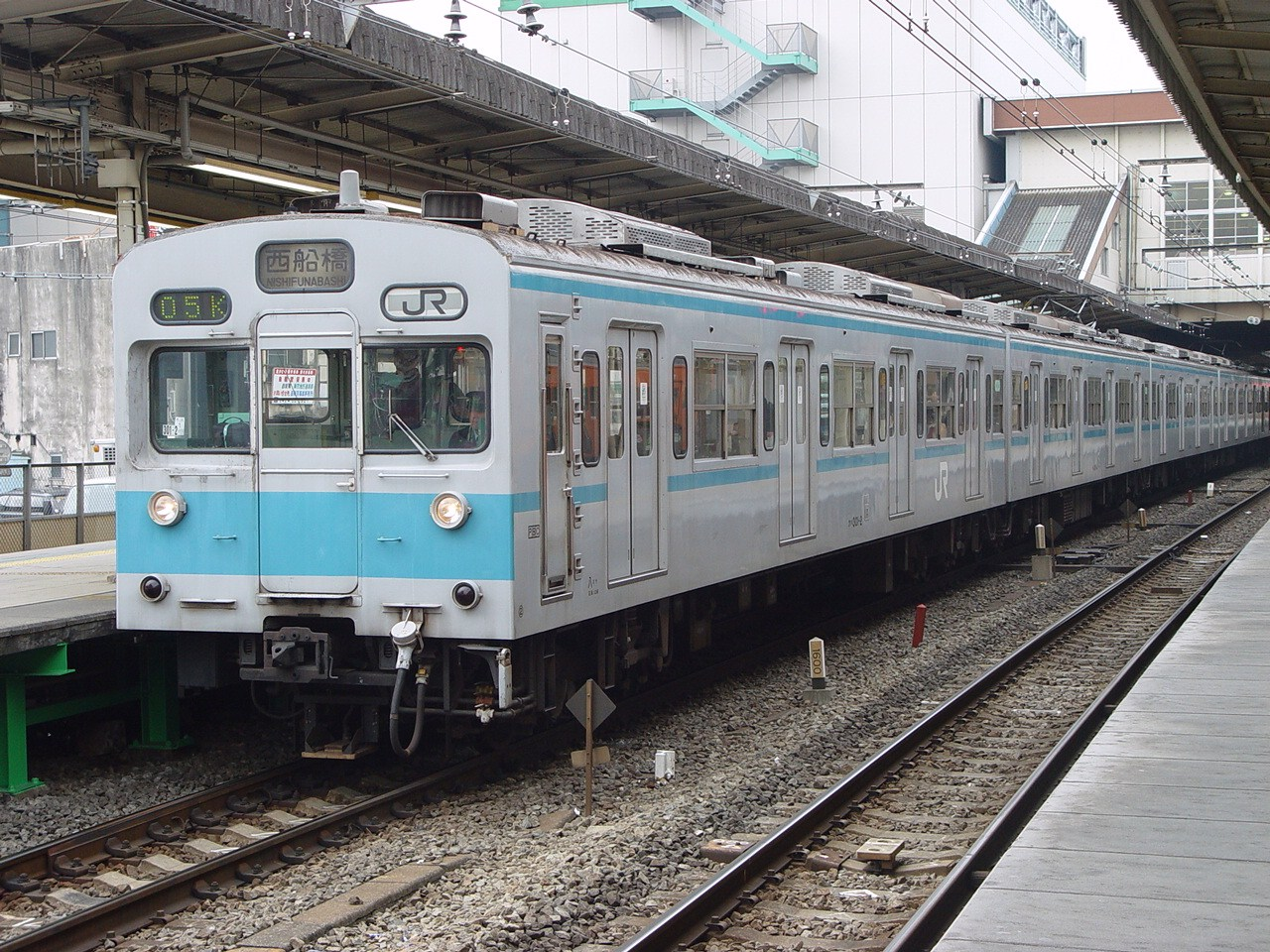
A Chūō-Sōbu Line 301 series EMU in February 2003

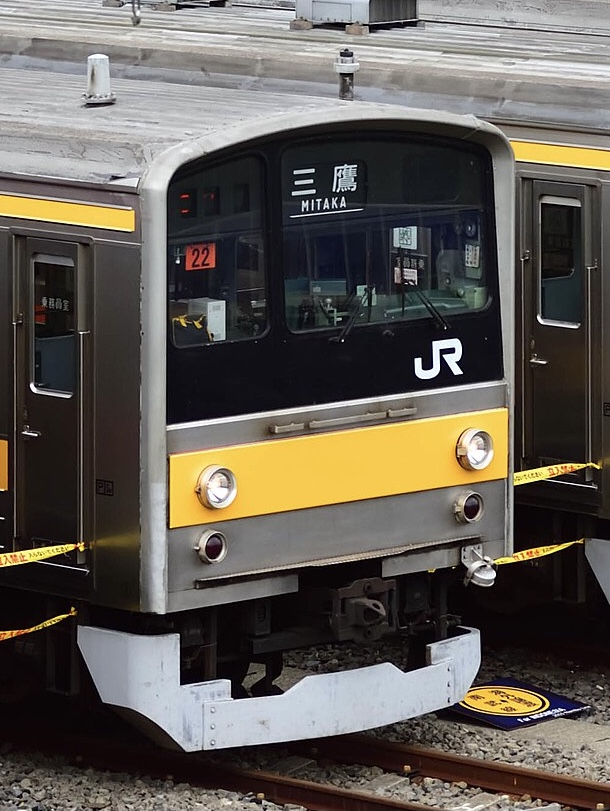
A Chūō-Sōbu Line 205 series EMU

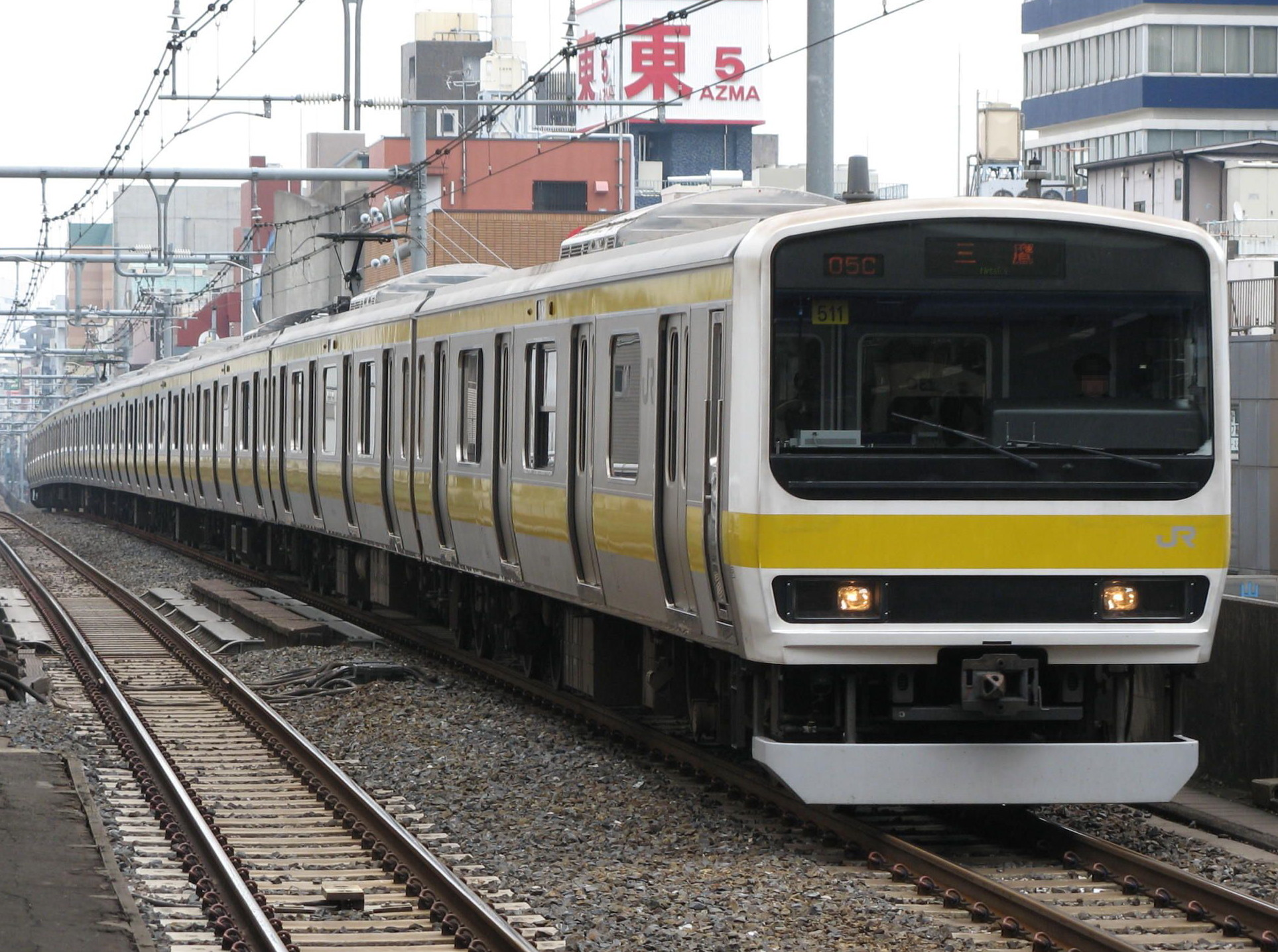
A Chūō-Sōbu Line 209-500 series EMU in April 2009

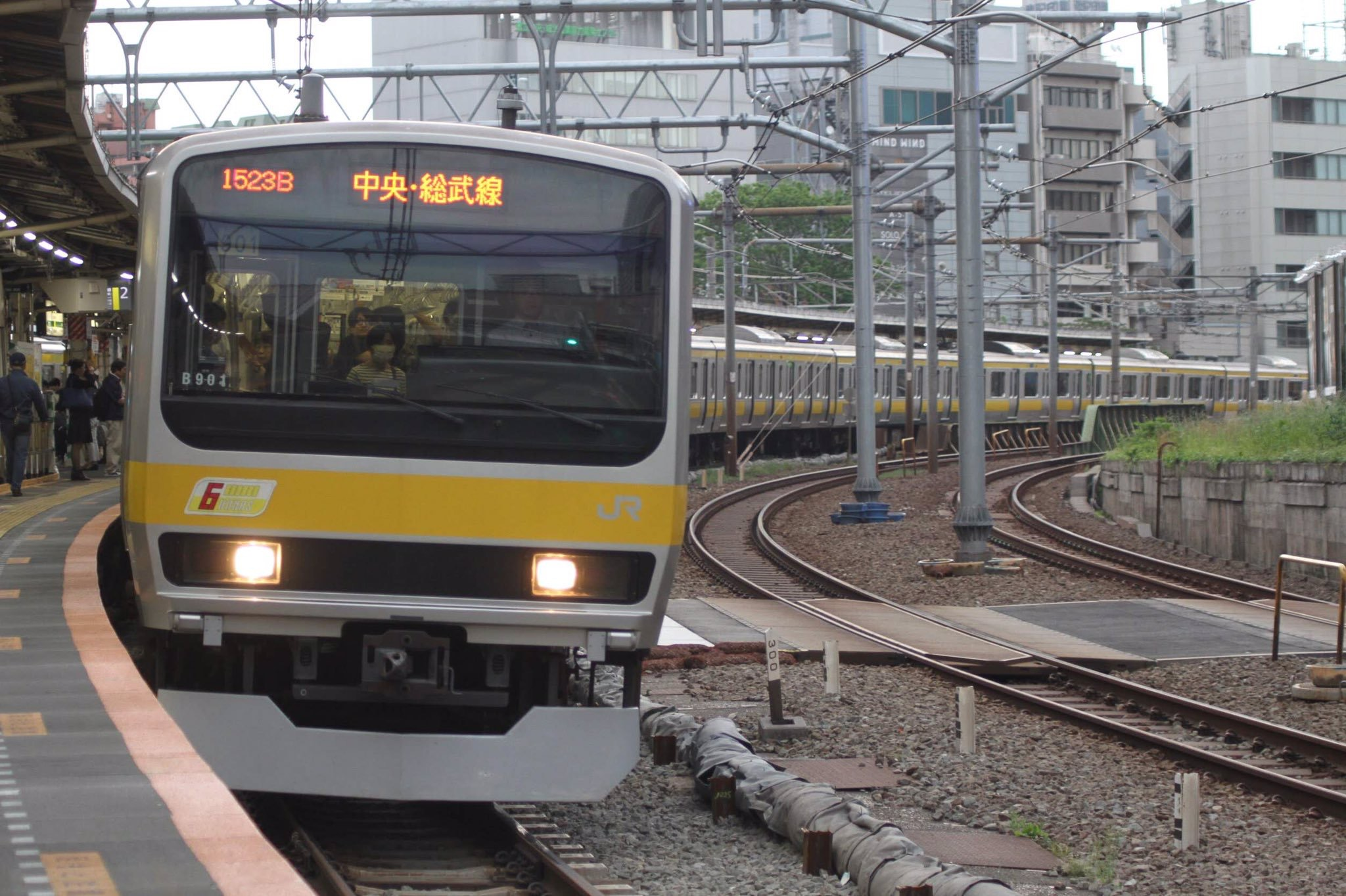
The sole E231-900 series EMU in June 2019

=== Future rolling stock ===
- E235-0 series 10-car EMUs (yellow stripe) (since March 2027)
  - E231-0 series which is not corresponded to one-person operation will have withdrew from Chuo-Sobu Line until 2027. Because one-person operation commences since March 2027.

=== Timeline ===
101 series
103 series
201 series
205 series
209-500 series
209-950 / E231-900 series
E231-0 series
E231-500 series
301 series
103-1000, 103-1200 series
E231-800 series
TRTA/Tokyo Metro 5000 series
TRTA 8000 series
TRTA/Tokyo Metro 05 series
Tokyo Metro 07 series
Tokyo Metro 15000 series
│
1965
│
1970
│
1975
│
1980
│
1985
│
1990
│
1995
│
2000
│
2005
│
2010
│
2015
│
2020
Rolling stock transitions since 1965

== History ==
A Chūō–Sōbu Line train crosses a bridge in Chiyoda, Tokyo, 2021

Women-only cars, designed to prevent gropers, were introduced on this line during morning peak periods starting on 20 November 2006.

On 20 August 2016, station numbering was introduced to the Chuo-Sobu line with stations being assigned station numbers between JB01 and JB39. Numbers increase towards in the eastbound direction towards Chiba.

On March 2027, one-person operation commences on a wholy line excluding Tozai Line trains which run as though-service between Funabashi and Tsudanuma, and between Nakano and Mitaka. Therefore, E231-0 series which is not corresponded to one-person operation will withdraw from Chuo-Sobu Line.
