= Tsudanuma Station =

Railway station in Narashino, Chiba Prefecture, Japan

JO26 JB33 Tsudanuma Station 津田沼駅
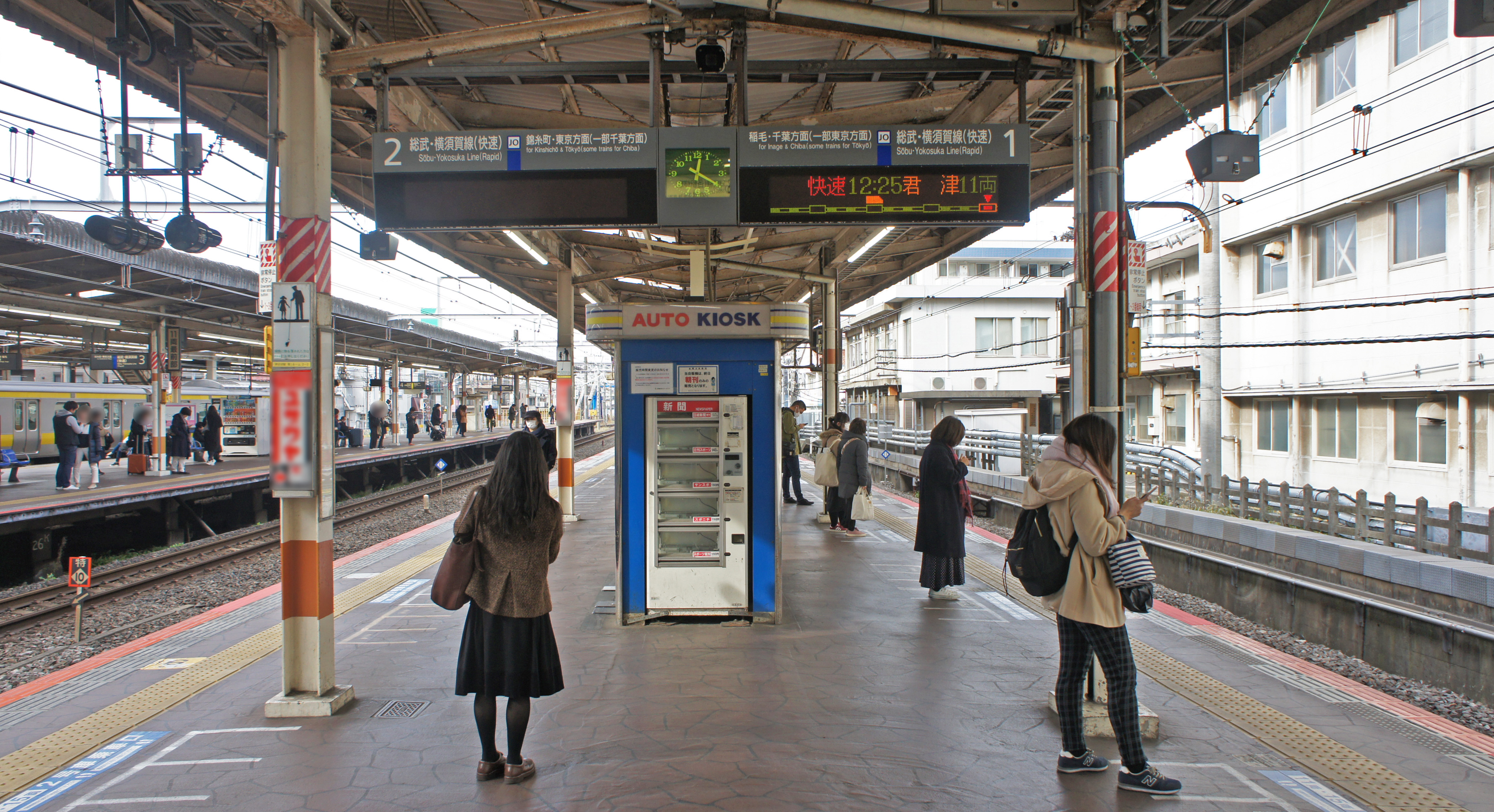
- Platform 1・2 (Rapid Line) of JR Sobu-Main-Line Tsudanuma Station

General information
- Location: 1-Tsudanuma, Narashino-shi, Chiba-ken; Japan
- Coordinates: 35.691221°N 140.020478°E
- Operator: JR East
- Lines: Chūō-Sōbu Line; Sōbu Line (Rapid)
- Platforms: 3 island platforms
- Connections: Shin-Tsudanuma Station

Other information
- Status: Staffed (Midori no Madoguchi)
- Station code: JB33 (Chūō-Sōbu Line); JO26 (Sōbu Line (Rapid))
- Website: Official website

History
- Opened: September 21, 1895

Passengers
- FY2019: 102,846 daily

Services
Preceding station	JR East	Following station
Funabashi JO25 towards Tokyo	Sōbu Line Rapid	Inage JO27 towards Chiba
Higashi-Funabashi JB32 towards Mitaka	Chūō–Sōbu Line	Makuharihongō JB34 towards Chiba
Higashi-Funabashi JB32 towards Mitaka	Chūō–Sōbu Line via Tōzai Line	Terminus
Location
- Location within Chiba Prefecture Location within Japan

Tsudanuma Station (津田沼駅, Tsudanuma-eki) is a junction passenger railway station located in the city of Narashino, Chiba, Japan, operated by the East Japan Railway Company (JR East).

== Lines ==
Tsudanuma Station is served by the Sōbu Main Line (rapid service and local service). It is 26.7 kilometers from the starting point of both lines at Tokyo Station.

== Station layout ==
Tsudanuma Station consists of three island platforms serving six tracks, with an elevated station building. The station has a Midori no Madoguchi staffed ticket office.

=== Platforms ===
1, 2	Sōbu Line (Rapid)	for Chiba and Narita Airport (Terminal 2·3 and Terminal 1)
2, 3	Sōbu Line (Rapid)	for Kinshichō and Tokyo; Yokosuka Line for Shinagawa
4	Chūō-Sōbu Line	for Makuharihongō and Chiba
5	Chūō-Sōbu Line	for Nishi-Funabashi, Akihabara and Shinjuku; Tokyo Metro Tozai Line for Urayasu, Nihombashi and Otemachi
6	Chūō-Sōbu Line	for Nishi-Funabashi, Akihabara and Shinjuku

== History ==
The station opened on September 21, 1895.

== Passenger statistics ==
In fiscal 2019, the station was used by an average of 102,846 passengers daily (boarding passengers only).

The daily passenger figures (boarding passengers only) in previous years are as shown below.

Fiscal year	Daily average
2000	105,205
2005	103,922
2010	101,247
2015	103,404

== Surrounding area ==
- Shin-Tsudanuma Station (Keisei Matsudo Line)
- Chiba Institute of Technology

== See also ==
- List of railway stations in Japan
