= Mitaka Station =

Railway station in Mitaka, Tokyo, Japan

JC12 JB01 Mitaka Station 三鷹駅
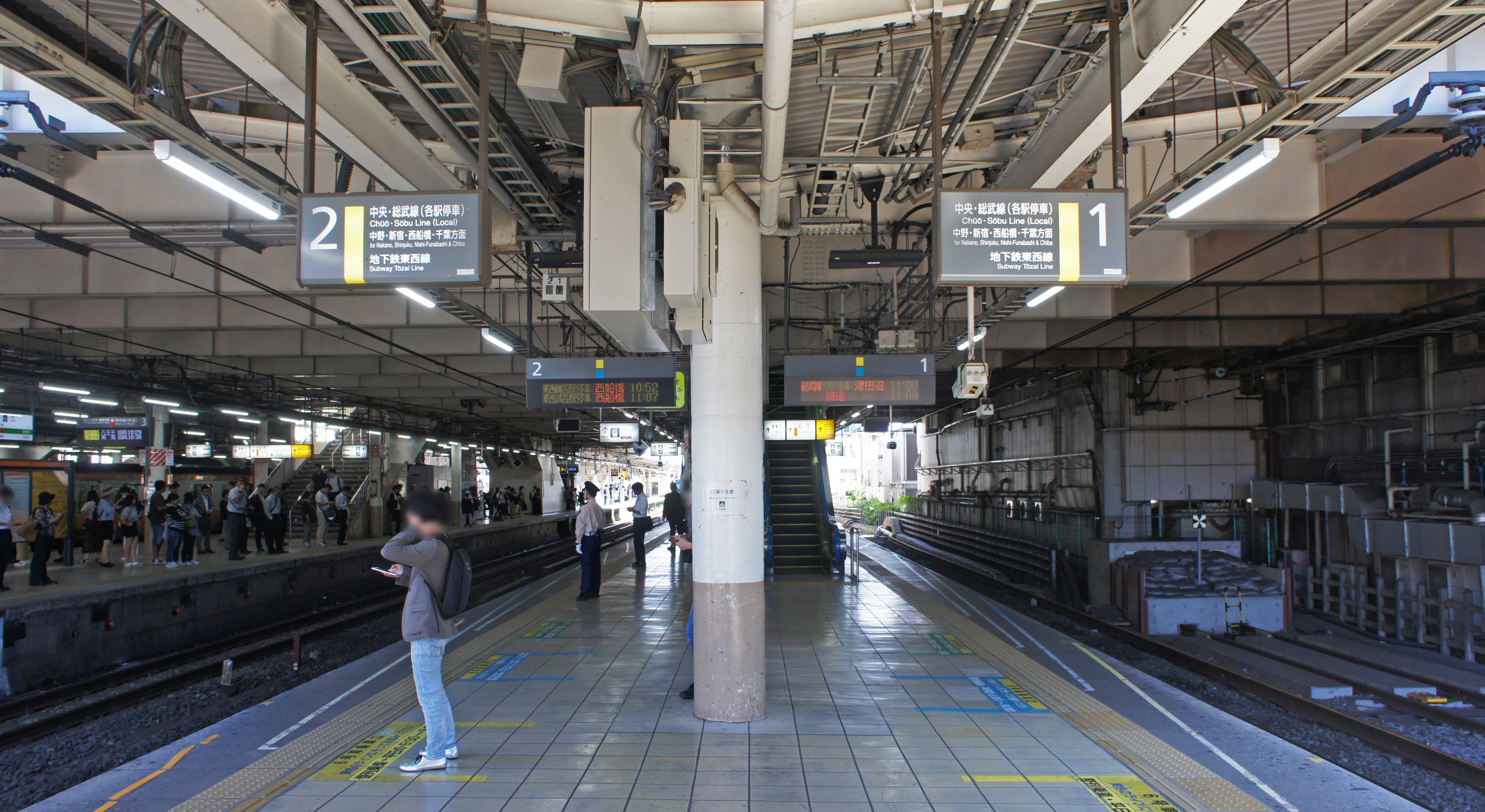
- Platform 1・2 (Chuo-Sobu Line) of JR Chuo-Main-Line Mitaka Station

General information
- Location: 3-46-1 Shimorenjaku, Mitaka-shi, Tokyo 181-0013; Japan
- Coordinates: 35°42′10″N 139°33′39″E
- Operator: JR East
- Line: ■ Chūō Main Line
- Distance: 24.1 km from Tokyo
- Platforms: 3 island platforms
- Connections: Bus stop

Other information
- Status: Staffed (Midori no Madoguchi)
- Website: Official website

History
- Opened: 25 June 1930

Passengers
- FY2024: 173,686 (daily)

Services
Preceding station	JR East	Following station
Kokubunji JC16 towards Ōtsuki	Chūō Line Chūō Special Rapid	Nakano JC06 towards Tokyo
Kokubunji JC16 towards Tachikawa	Chūō Line Ōme Special Rapid	Nakano JC06 towards Tokyo
Kokubunji JC16 towards Ōtsuki	Chūō Line Commuter Rapid	Kichijōji One-way operation
Musashi-Sakai JC13 towards Ōtsuki	Chūō Line Rapid	Kichijōji JC11 towards Tokyo
Terminus	Chūō–Sōbu Line	Kichijōji JB02 towards Chiba
Terminus	Chūō–Sōbu Line via Tōzai Line	Kichijōji JB02 towards Tsudanuma
Location
- Location within Tokyo Location within Japan

Mitaka Station (三鷹駅, Mitaka-eki) is a passenger railway station located in the city of Mitaka, Tokyo, Japan, operated by the East Japan Railway Company (JR East). Part of the station (north of the Tamagawa Aqueduct) is located in the Nakacho neighborhood of Musashino, Tokyo.

== Lines ==
Mitaka Station is served by the Chūō Main Line, acting as the terminus for all-stations Chūō-Sōbu Line services from Chiba, with Chūō Line (Rapid) limited stop services from Tokyo. Some Tokyo Metro Tōzai Line inter-running services also originate and terminate here. The station is 24.1 kilometers from Tokyo Station.

== Station layout ==
The station comprises three island platforms serving six tracks, with the station building located above and perpendicular to the platforms. The station has a "Midori no Madoguchi" staffed ticket office.

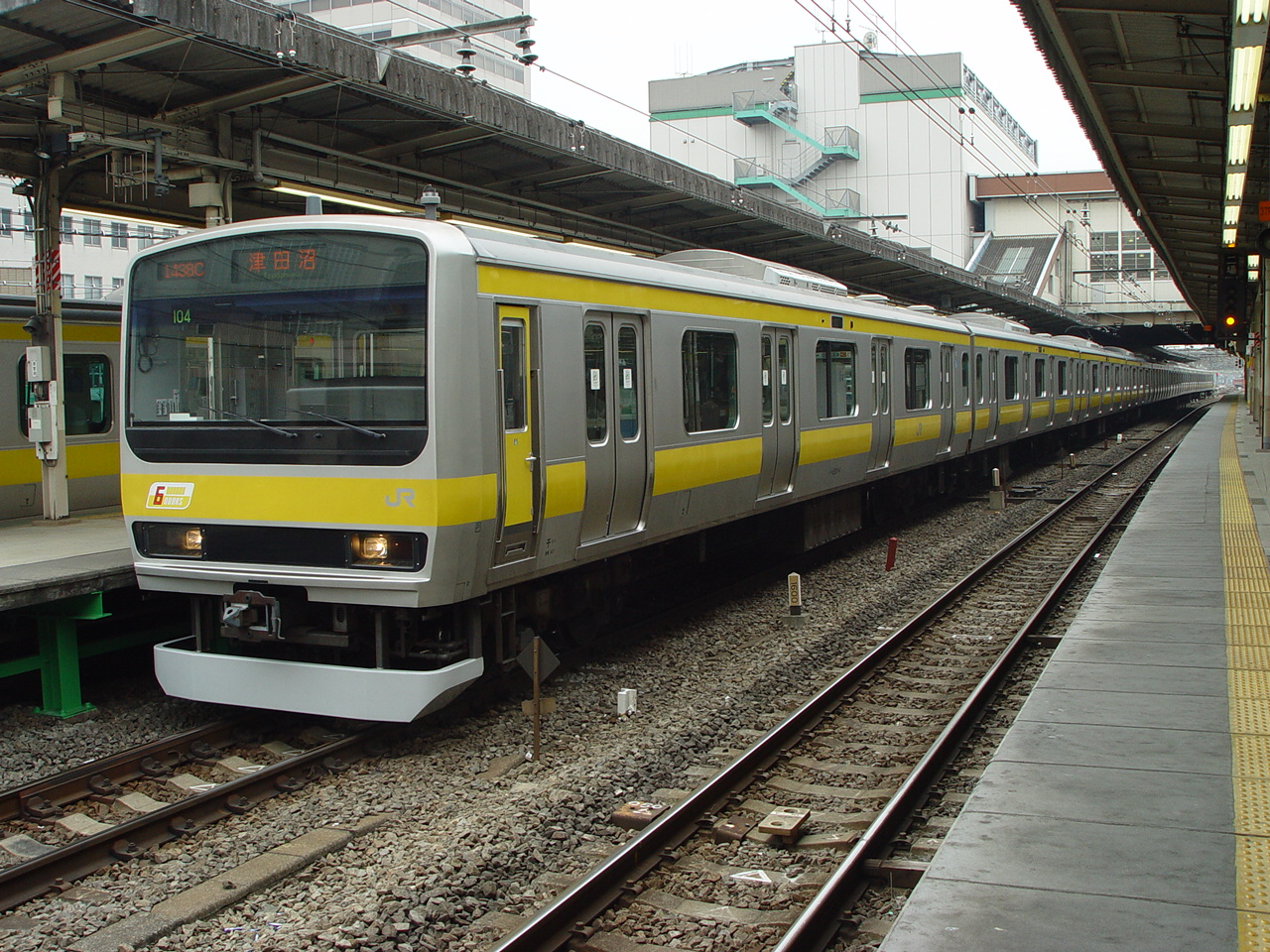
A Chūō-Sōbu Line train at Mitaka Station, February 2003

=== Platforms ===
1/2	Chūō-Sōbu Line	for Nakano, Shinjuku, Akihabara, Tsudanuma, and Chiba; Tokyo Metro Tōzai Line for Nishi-Funabashi
3/4	Chūō Line (Rapid)	for Tachikawa, Hachiōji, Takao; Ome Line for Ōme
5/6	Chūō Line (Rapid)	for Shinjuku and Tokyo

== History ==
Mitaka Station opened on 25 June 1930. On 15 July 1949, an unmanned train, with its controls tied down, crashed into the station, killing 6 and injuring 20. The incident remains shrouded in mystery.

== Passenger statistics ==
In fiscal 2019, the JR station was used by an average of 98,796 passengers daily (boarding passengers only) making it the 44th busiest JR East station. The daily passenger figures (boarding passengers only) in previous years are as shown below.

Fiscal year	Daily average
2000	82,335
2005	85,602
2010	90,214
2015	94,805

== Surrounding area ==
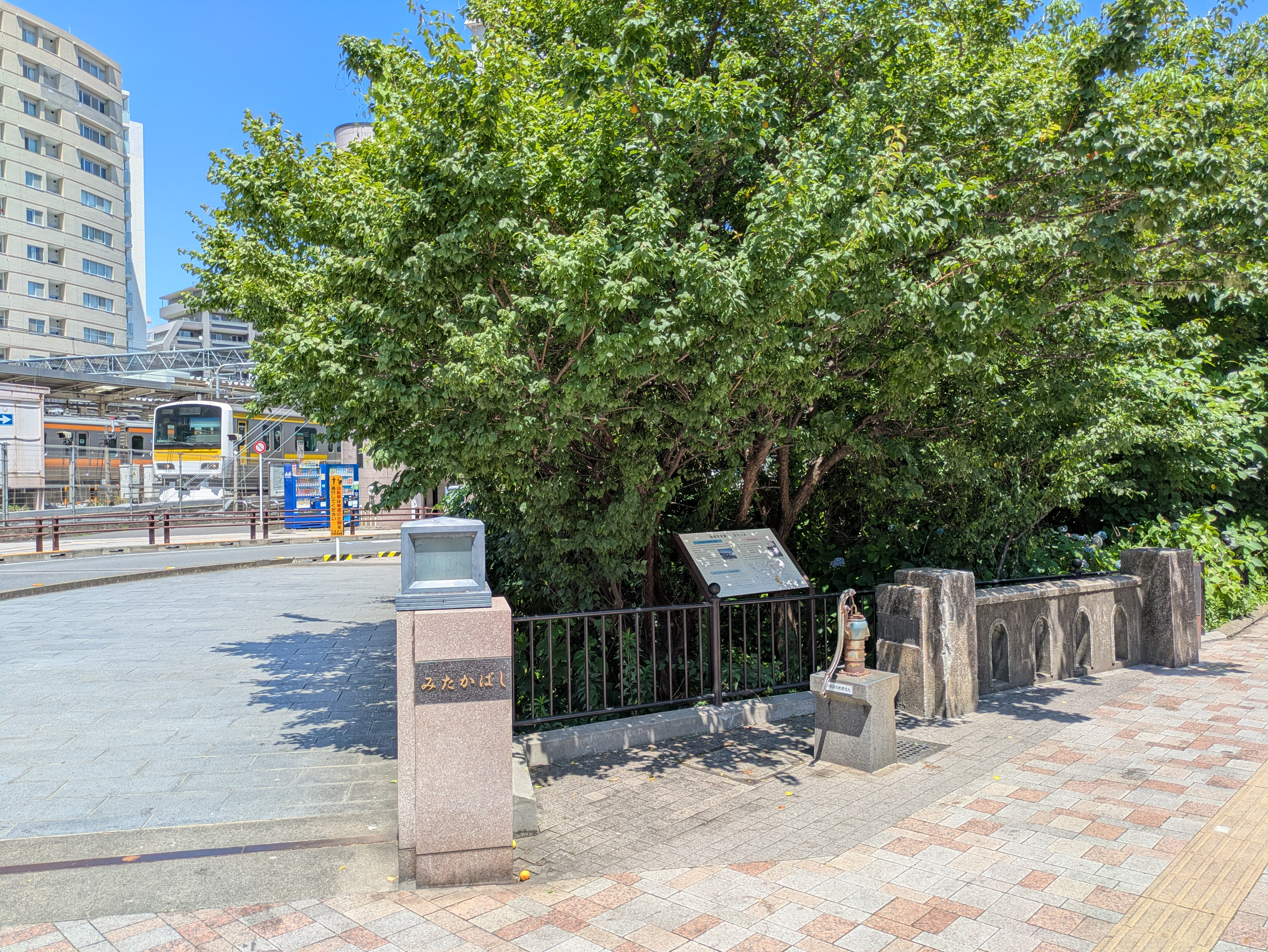
Tamagawa Aqueduct（2025）

- Tamagawa Aqueduct
- Musashino Municipal Athletic Stadium
- Musashino Sports Complex
- Musashino Chuo Park
- Mitaka City Office
- Musashino City Office
- Musashino Police Station
- Zenrinji Temple
- Inokashira Park
- Ghibli Museum

== See also ==
- List of railway stations in Japan
