= Chūō Line (Rapid) =

Rapid service railway line in Tokyo, Japan

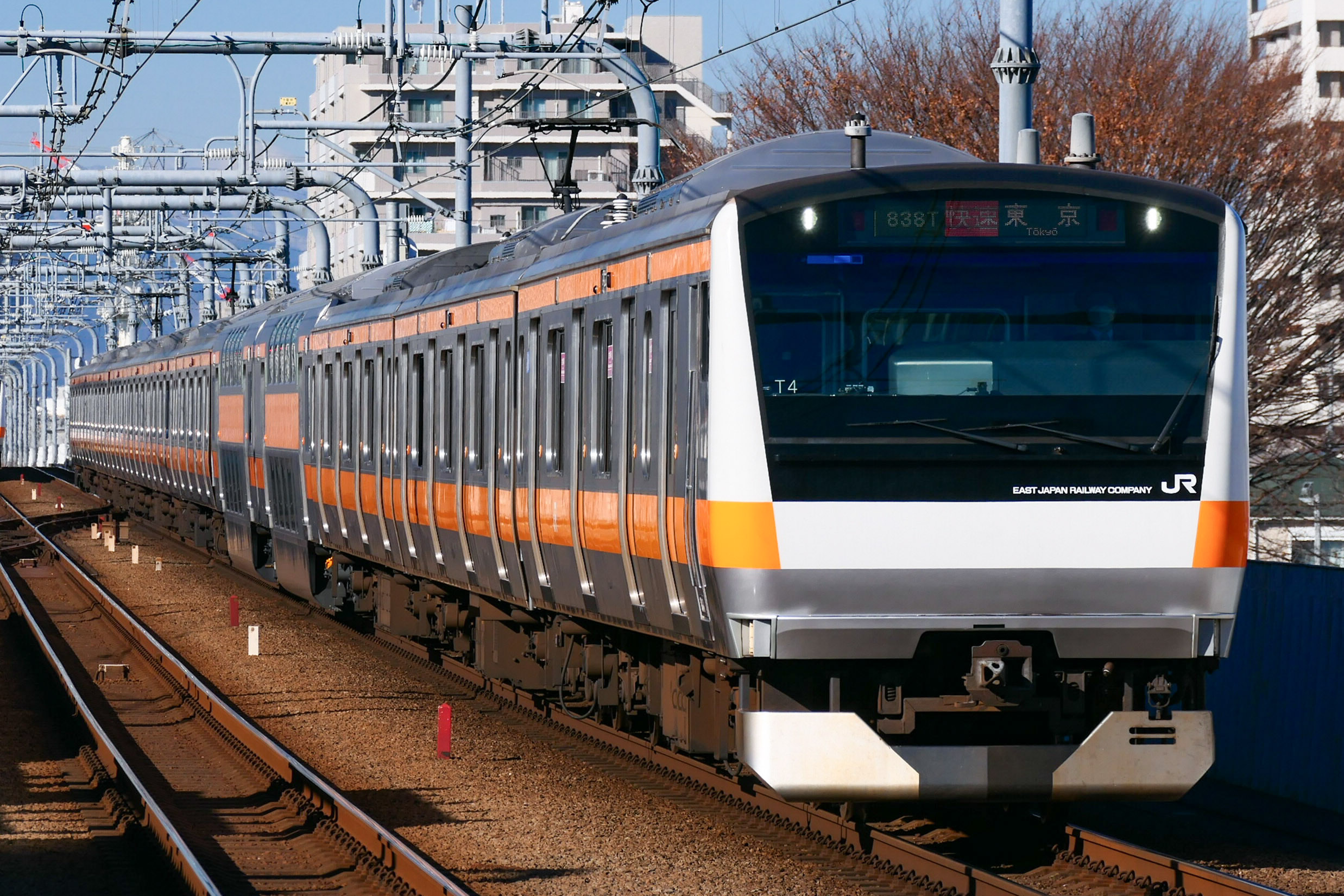
- A Chūō Line (Rapid) E233-0 series train heads towards Tokyo, February 2025

Overview
- Other name: JC
- Native name: 中央線快速 (Chūō-sen kaisoku)
- Owner: JR East
- Locale: Tokyo
- Termini: Tōkyō; Takao
- Stations: 24
- Color on map: Orange Vermillion

Service
- Type: Commuter rail
- Operator: JR East
- Depot(s): Musashi-Koganei, Toyoda
- Rolling stock: E233-0 series

History
- Opened: 11 April 1889; 137 years ago

Technical
- Line length: 53.1 km (33.0 mi)
- Num of tracks: 2
- Track gauge: 1,067 mm (3 ft 6 in)
- Electrification: Overhead line, 1,500 V DC
- Operating speed: 100 km/h (62 mph)
- Signalling: Automatic closed block
- Train protection system: ATS-P

The Chūō Line (Rapid) (Japanese: 中央線快速, Hepburn: Chūō-sen kaisoku) is the name given to a rapid train service in Greater Tokyo, operating between Tōkyō in Chiyoda, and Takao in Hachioji by the East Japan Railway Company (JR East). Some trains extend west beyond Takao to Ōtsuki in neighboring Yamanashi Prefecture. Other trains travel onward towards Ōme via the Ōme Line. It has been operating continuously in some form since April 1889 from its origins as part of the Kōbu Railway.

Chūō Line (Rapid) trains often rank among the most overcrowded in the Tokyo metropolitan area. It is the only mainline service to operate directly into the core of Tokyo without traveling through another company's tracks or customers having to change trains, and serves highly desirable communities in western Tokyo.

For station numbering, it is identified with the code JC. It is colored orange vermillion on railway maps, and E233-0 series trains assigned to the service have stripes with this color.

== History ==
=== Early history ===
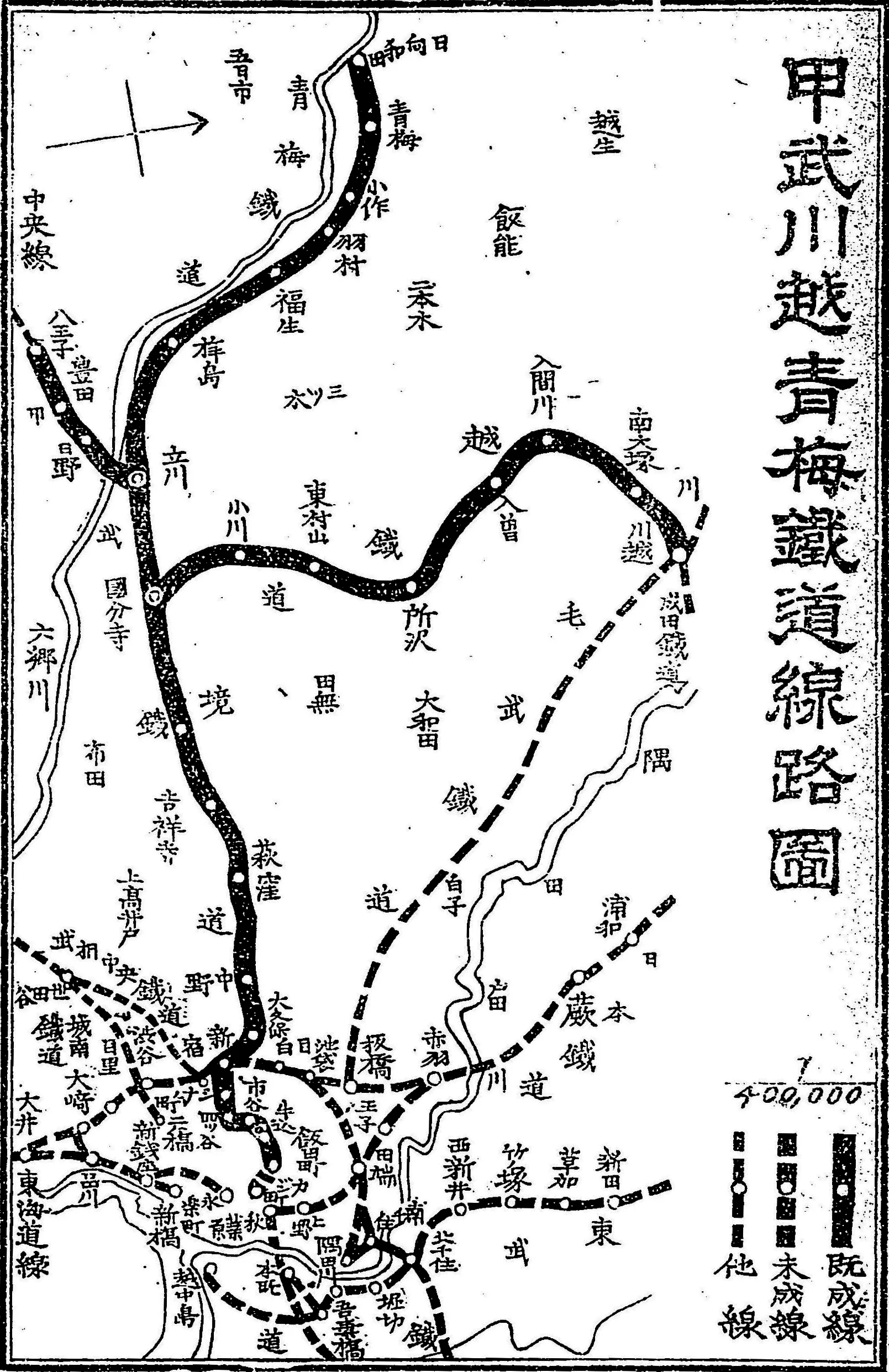
A route map of the Kobu Railway, dating from 1903

Most of the route of the Chūō Line (Rapid) was built by the Kōbu Railway during the Meiji era and entered service in two phases as the Kōbu Line. The first was between Tachikawa and Shinjuku, opening on 11 April 1889. Trains took one hour to travel between those two points and only went as fast as 30 km/h (18.64 mph). The second section between Tachikawa and Hachioji opened later on 11 August. Around the time of opening, there were only four round trips per day, and only one of them traveled the full route between Hachioji and Shinjuku. Additionally, as most of west Tokyo was not yet developed or populated, stations were only located at Nakano, Sakai (now Musashi-Sakai), Kokubunji, and Tachikawa. This was expanded to six round trips with an extension to Iidamachi (near today's Iidabashi) in April 1895.

In response to high ridership, the line was electrified in August 1904 between Nakano and Iidamachi, becoming the first rapid electric railway in Tokyo and electric powered De-968 cars were brought into service. Service was extended to Ochanomizu on 31 December 1904. Kōbu Railway was later acquired by Japanese Government Railways (JGR), and was nationalized on 1 October 1906. At that time, the line adopted its current name, the Chūō Line.

In the 1910s, service was extended further eastwards into central Tokyo, first to Manseibashi in April 1912, and then to the current Tōkyō terminus in March 1919.

By 1930, the line had been electrified between Tōkyō to the east, and Asakawa (now Takao) to the west. In 1933, two additional tracks were added to the existing double-tracked section between Ochanomizu and Iidamachi stations to complete the four-track line between Ochanomizu and Nakano. This allowed the introduction of express trains (急行電車, kyūkō densha), a precursor to current rapid service, on 15 September. These trains only stopped at Tōkyō, Kanda, Manseibashi, Ochanomizu, Yotsuya, Shinjuku, and Nakano. Express service only operated during peak hours on weekdays.

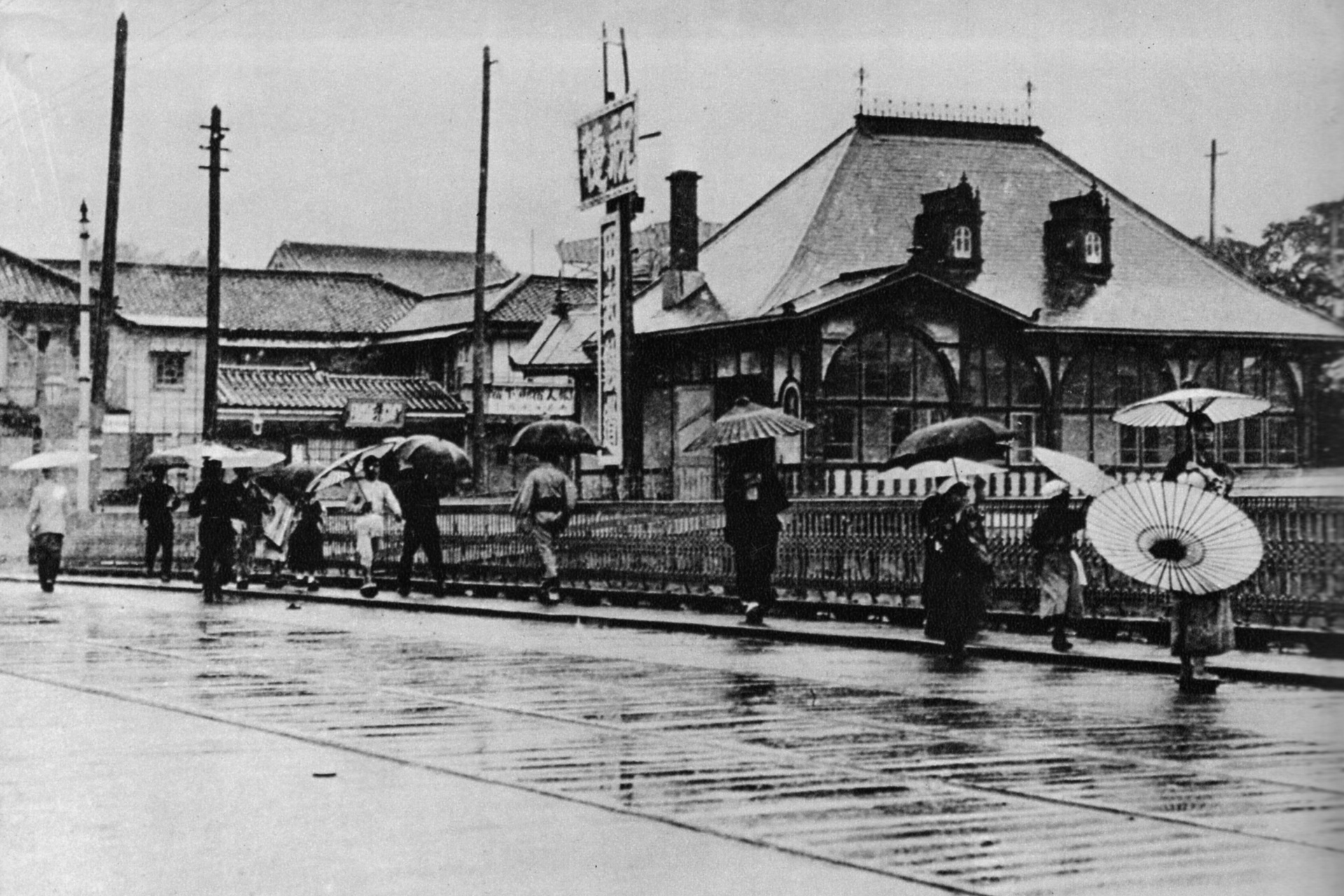
Ochanomizu station in 1905.

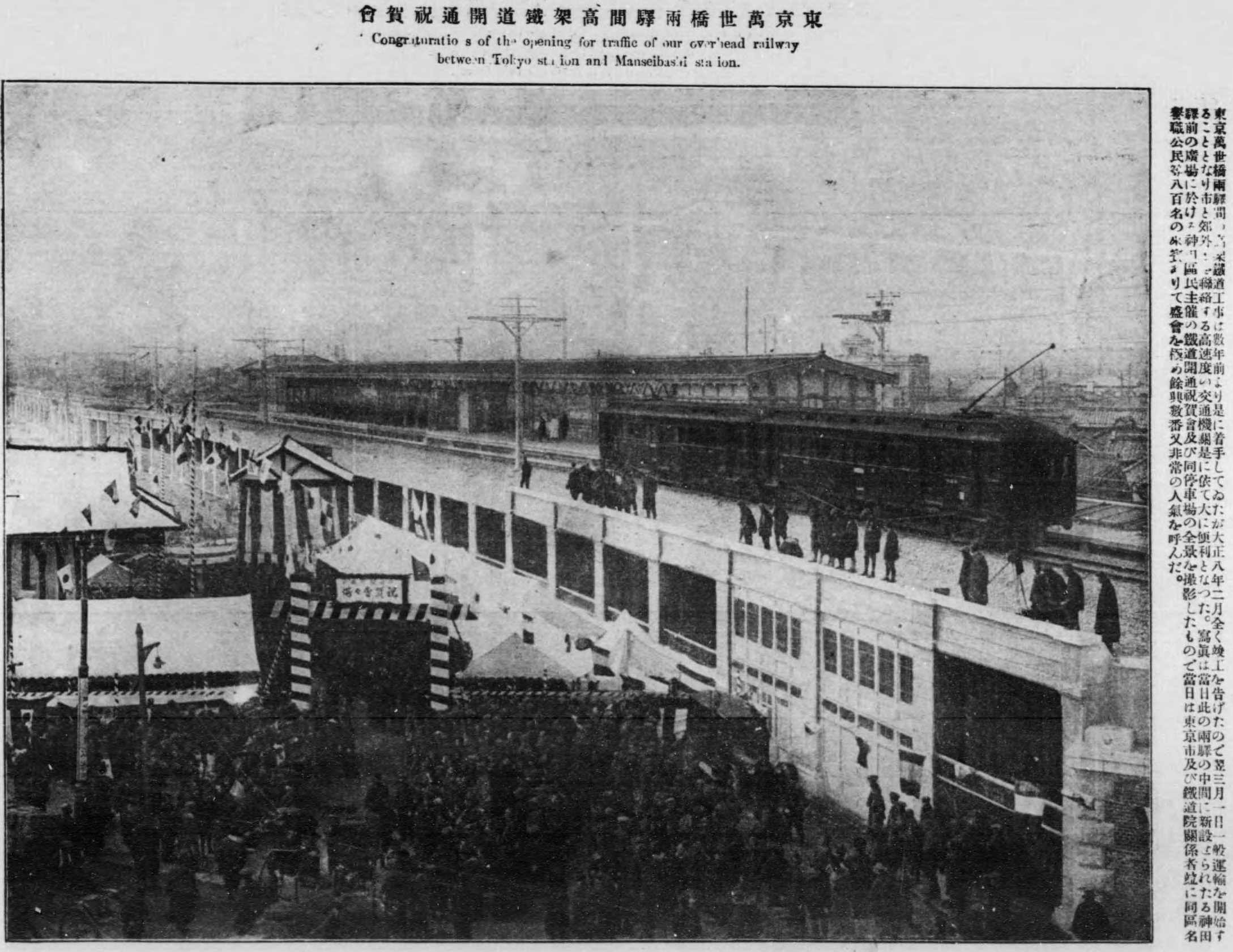
Kanda station in 1919.

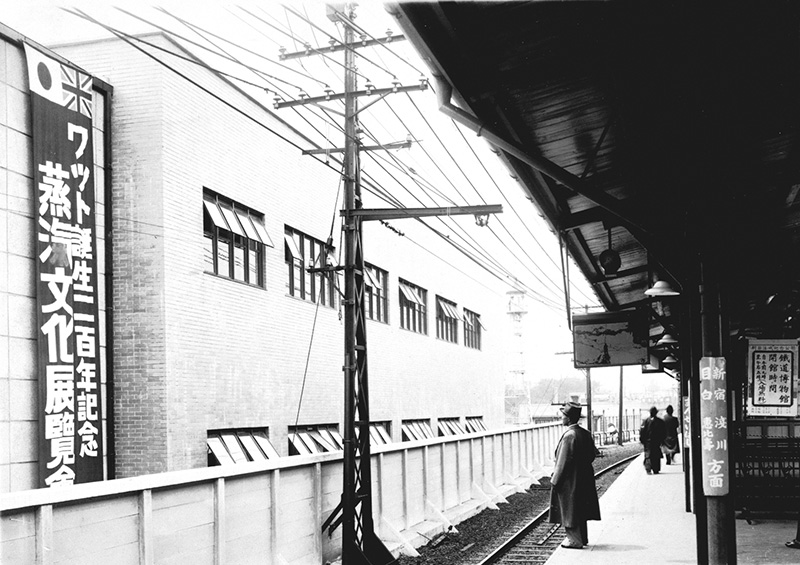
Manseibashi station in 1936.

=== Post-war ===
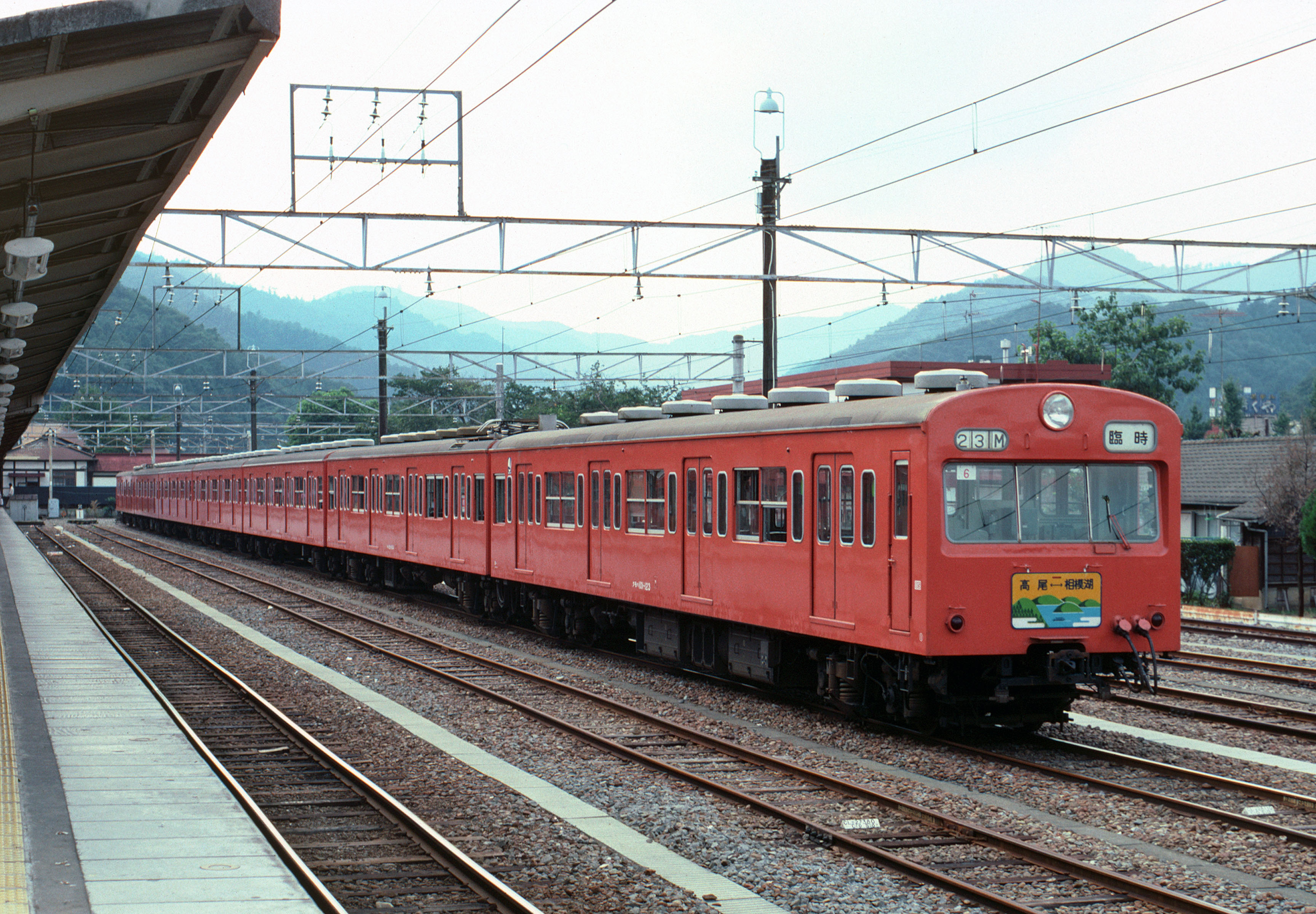
A JNR 101 series train at Takao in September 1983

After World War II, JGR became Japanese National Railways (JNR). Areas of west Tokyo experienced large population growth during the post-war boom, and in turn resulted in very crowded trains, some operating at 300% above full capacity.

JNR 101 Series trains were introduced starting in December 1957 with a prototype unit. Production trains were delivered to Mitaka Depot and entered service a year later. These electric trains had four double-leafed doors per side, featured quicker acceleration, and were 10 cars long, ideally accommodating as much as 1,400 passengers per train. They were colored ◼︎ orange vermillion (officially JNR Vermillion No. 1), which became the trademark color for the Chūō Line and all its future rolling stock.

In November 1959, all-day express service was introduced on weekdays.

On 17 March 1961, the Chūō Line express trains were rebranded as "Rapid" (快速, kaisoku). This was done to reduce confusion, as a limited express service, the Azusa, was being extended to Shinjuku, but required higher fares than the conventional rapid trains on the line. Weekend and holiday rapid service commenced in April 1966, though some trains during the first and last hours of service continue to make all local stops. On 3 July 1967, a Special Rapid service variant was introduced, stopping at fewer stations than normal Rapid service. These trains generally operated between Tōkyō and Takao or Ōme, and made all normal Rapid service stops east of Nakano. Between Nakano and Tachikawa, these trains operated as a super-express service, only stopping (from east to west) at Mitaka, Kokubunji, and Tachikawa. Kokubunji was skipped on these trains until 1993.

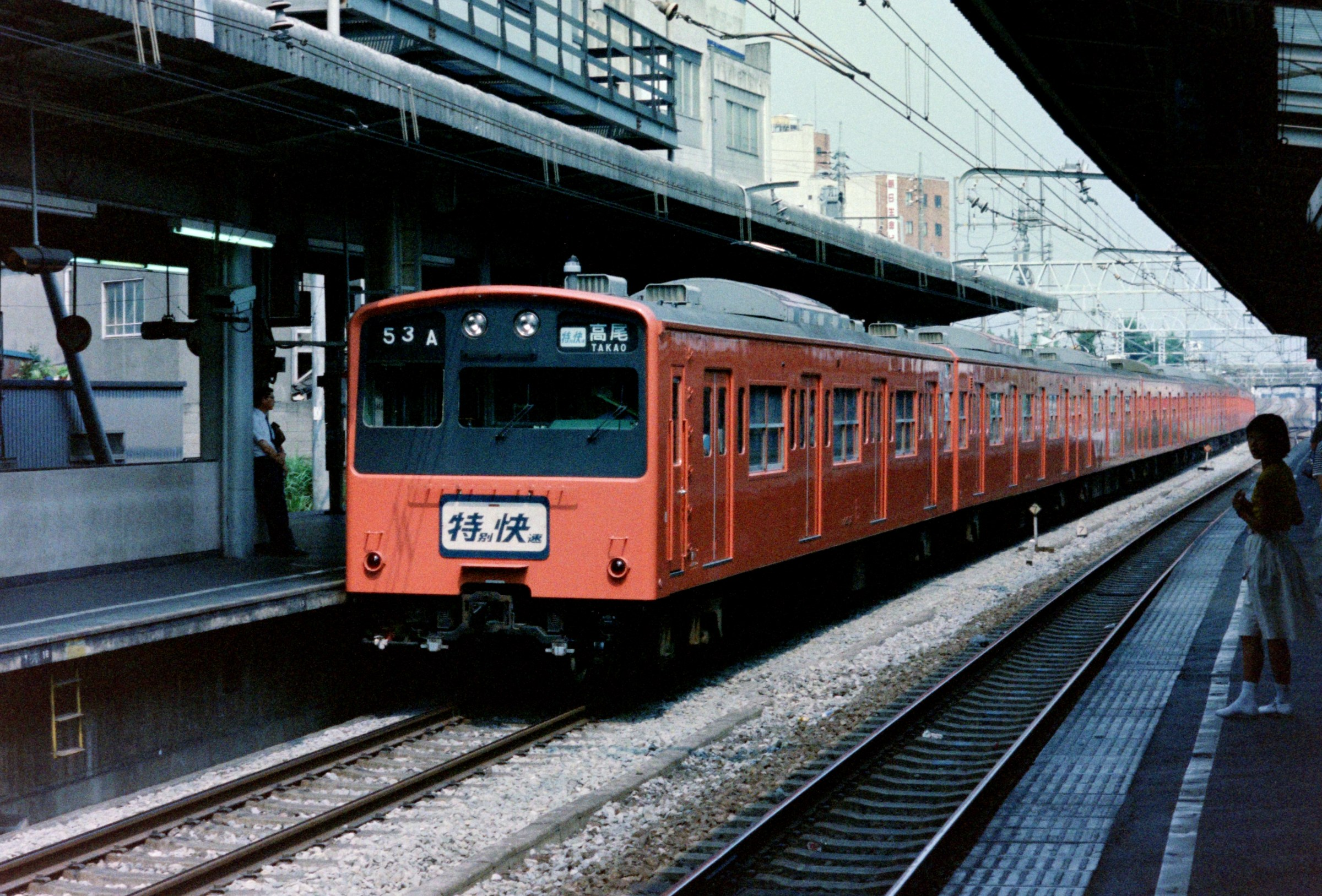
A 201 series signed up as a Special Rapid service train for Takao makes a stop at Ogikubo in August 1984.

Prototype 201 series trains began operating on 20 August 1979, with full service starting in August 1981, replacing the 101 series cars.

By 1987, Japanese National Railways had incurred a large amount of debt – ¥27 million. It was broken up and privatized into seven separate companies within the Japan Railways Group. The Chūō Line (Rapid) and other lines in the Kantō region fell under control of the East Japan Railway Company, or JR East.

In December 1988, another variant of rapid service began operation, the Commuter Rapid. These trains only operate outbound from Tōkyō during the afternoon peak and continue through the mid-evening. Between Nakano and Tachikawa, these trains only stop at Ogikubo, Kichijōji, Mitaka, and Kokubunji.

In April 1993, another Rapid variant began service, the Commuter Special Rapid. These trains only operate towards Tōkyō during the morning rush hour. By this point, direct Rapid service trains were also operating to and from Ōtsuki.

=== 2000s to the present ===
Grade separation at Musashi-Koganei

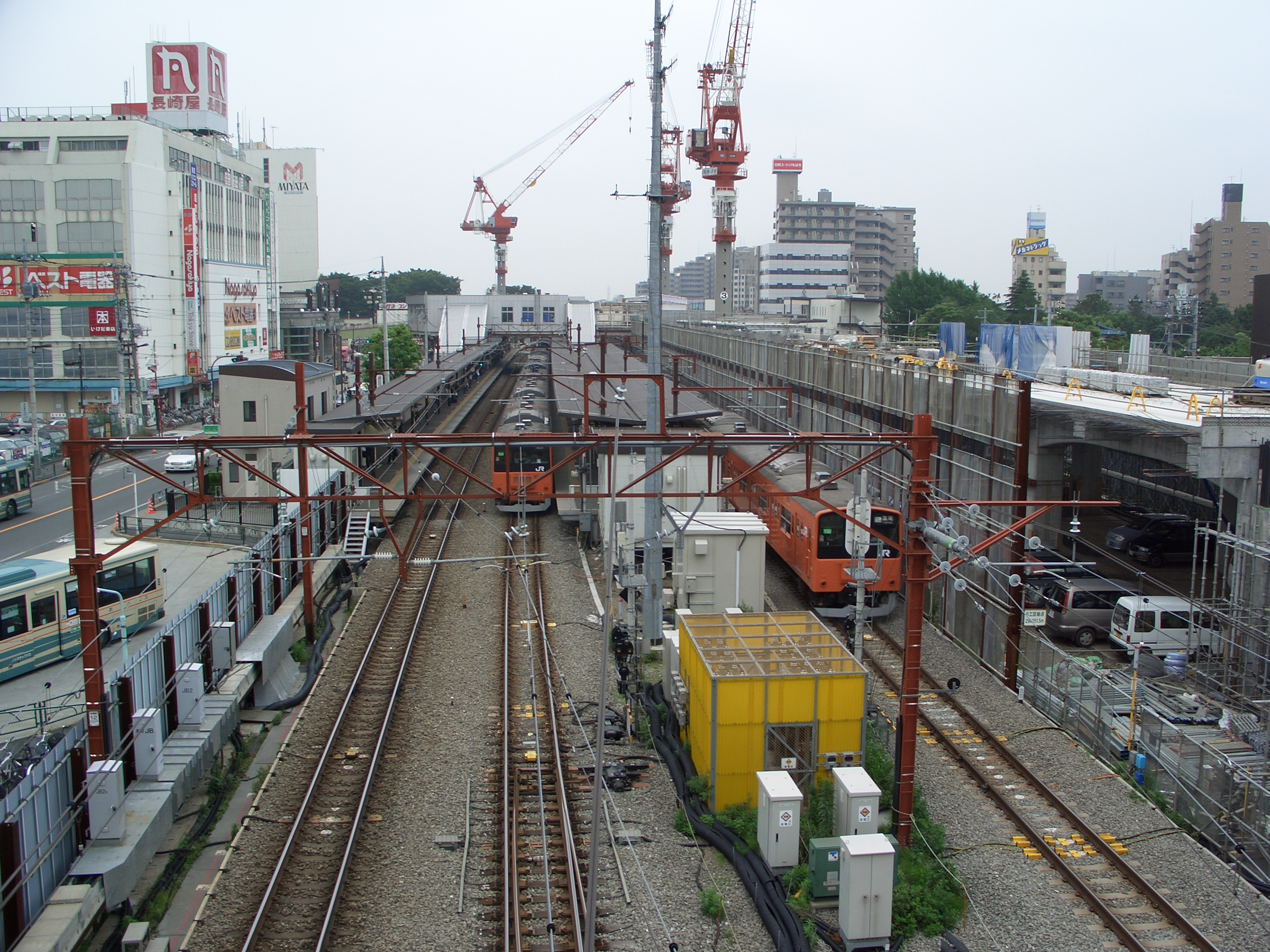
Grade separation getting underway in June 2006...

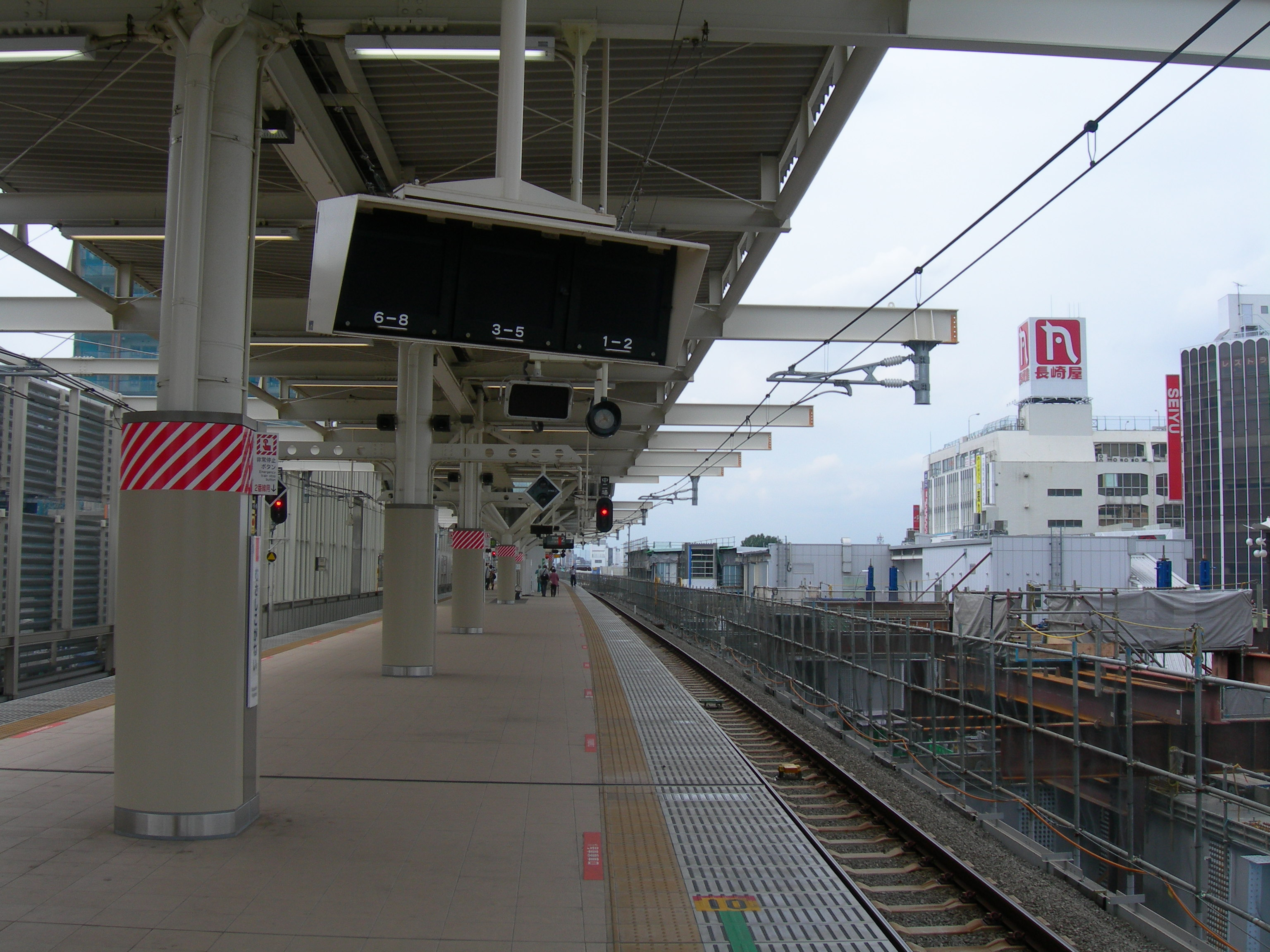
opening partially in August 2008...

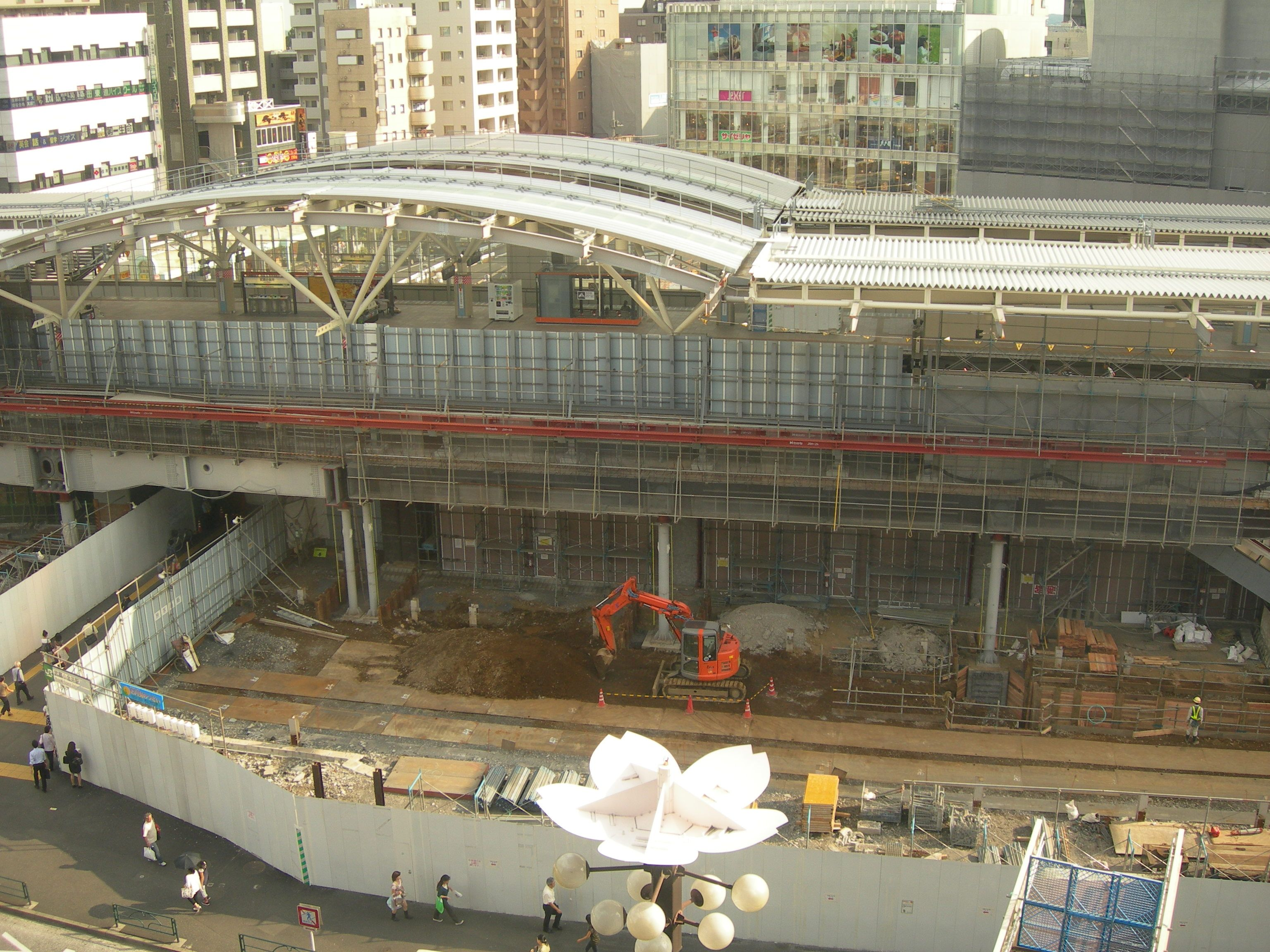
all tracks elevated in 2010...

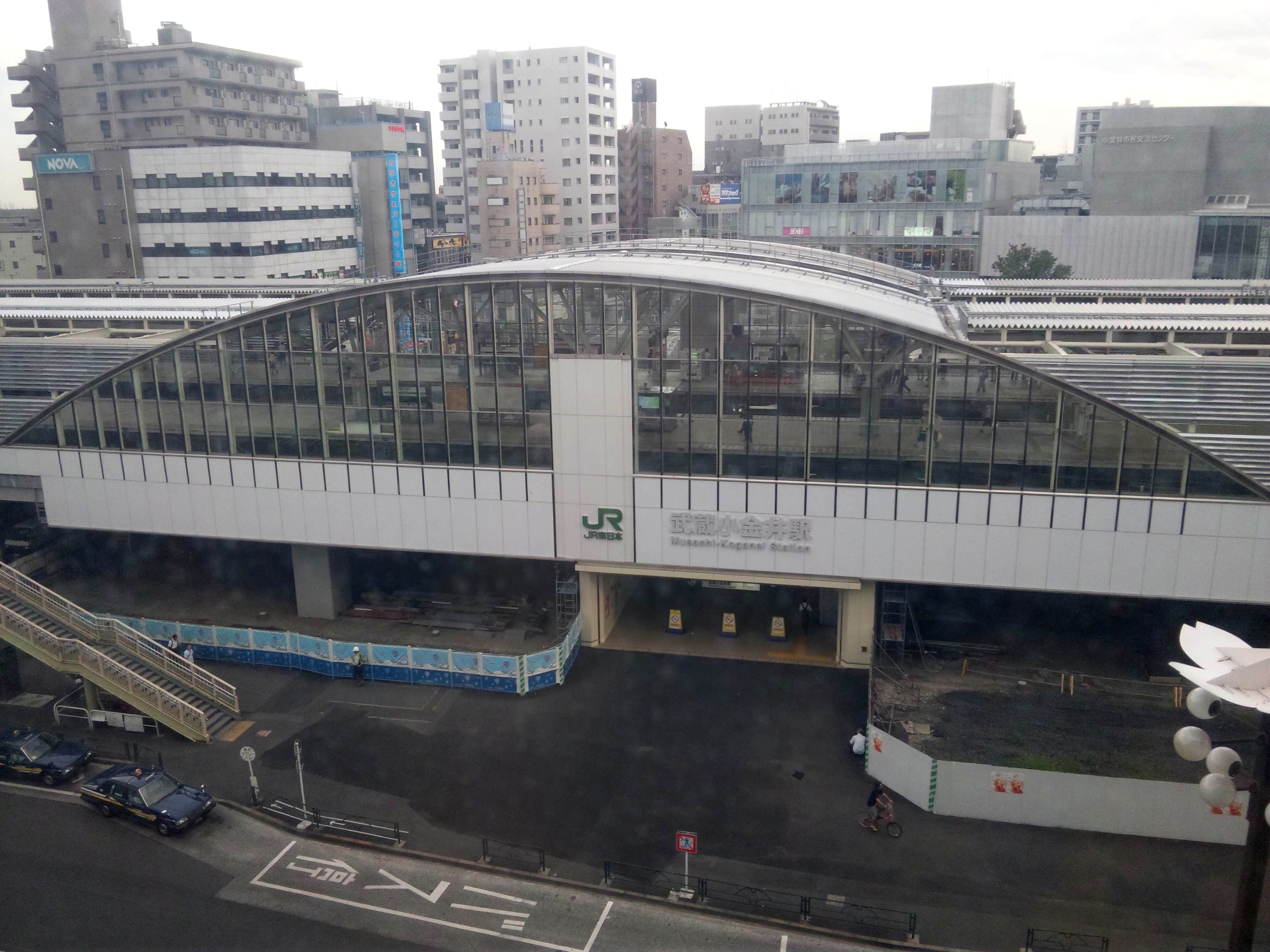
and mostly cleaned up in August 2012.

The 2000s brought on a major project to grade separate the line between Mitaka and Tachikawa at the cost of ¥180 billion. There were multiple grade crossings along the right-of-way, and as a result of frequent train service, gates were often closed. This led to high levels of traffic congestion, accidents, and a feeling amongst nearby residents of being disconnected from one another. The work along this 9 km (5.59 mi) section was done in phases, two tracks at a time starting in 1999, with trains using the two remaining tracks. The project was substantially completed in November 2010.

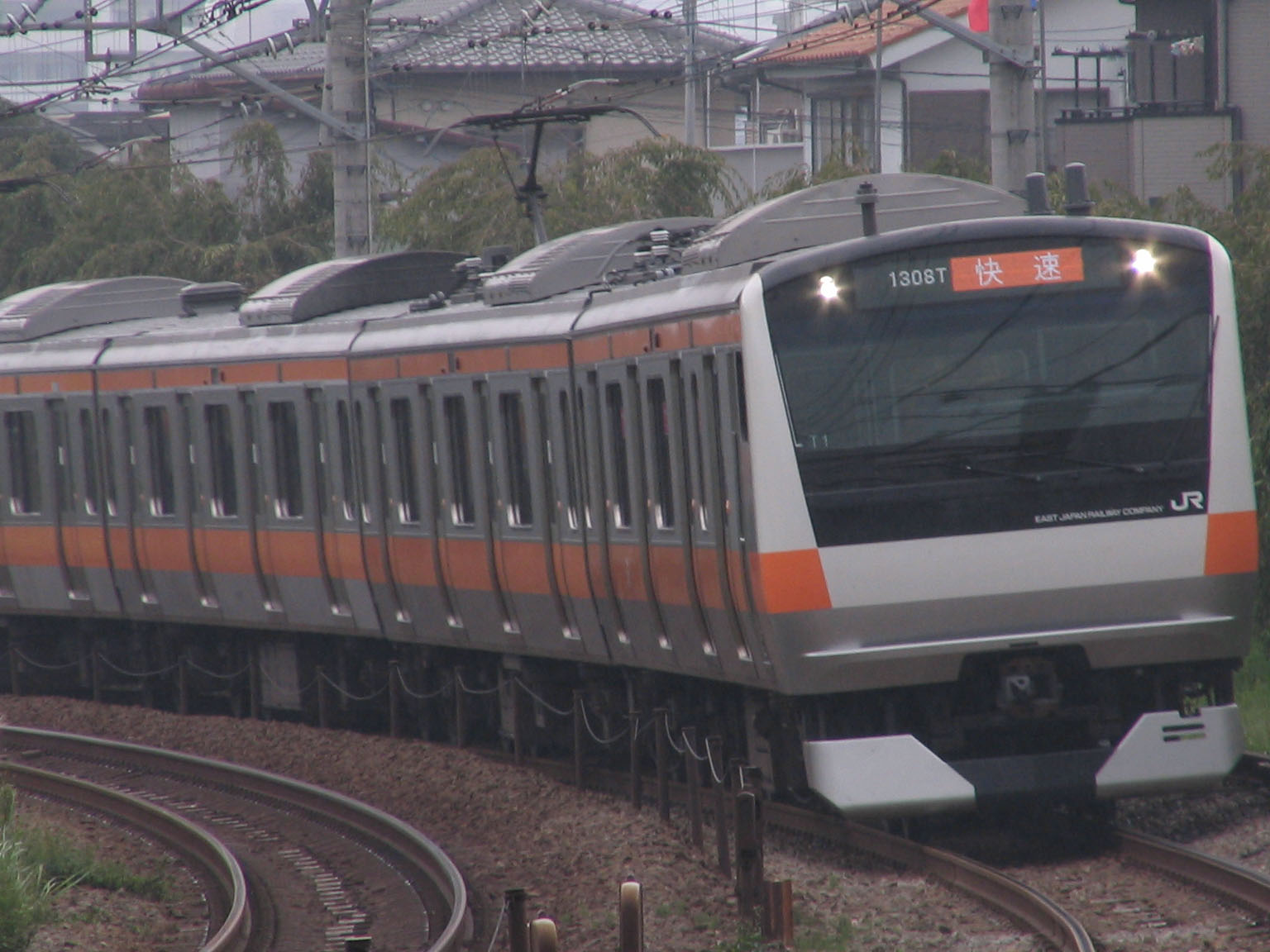
E233-0 series set T1 on a Chūō Line (Rapid) service run in September 2007

Women-only cars were introduced on 5 September 2005, they were offered during various periods in the past, even during the early days of the Chūō Line. Some iterations of this policy also allowed children of any gender to ride in these cars. On Chūō Line (Rapid) trains, this is car number #1, the first car on all trains towards Tōkyō. The policy is only in effect during the height of the morning peak on weekdays.

On 26 December 2006, E233 series trains entered service, and remains the current rolling stock on the line. 688 cars were initially ordered to replace the older 201 series trains, which operated until 14 October 2010. The E233s were built with universal design in mind, and JR East surveyed customers to gather further input on features to include such as air purification, and lower luggage racks in women-only cars. They also have backup internal systems in case of failure, reducing potential service disruptions.

In 2016, station numbering was introduced with stations being assigned numbers between JC01 (Tōkyō) and JC24 (Takao). Stations on the Ōme and Itsukaichi lines, where some trains operate as through services, are also identified with JC station codes.

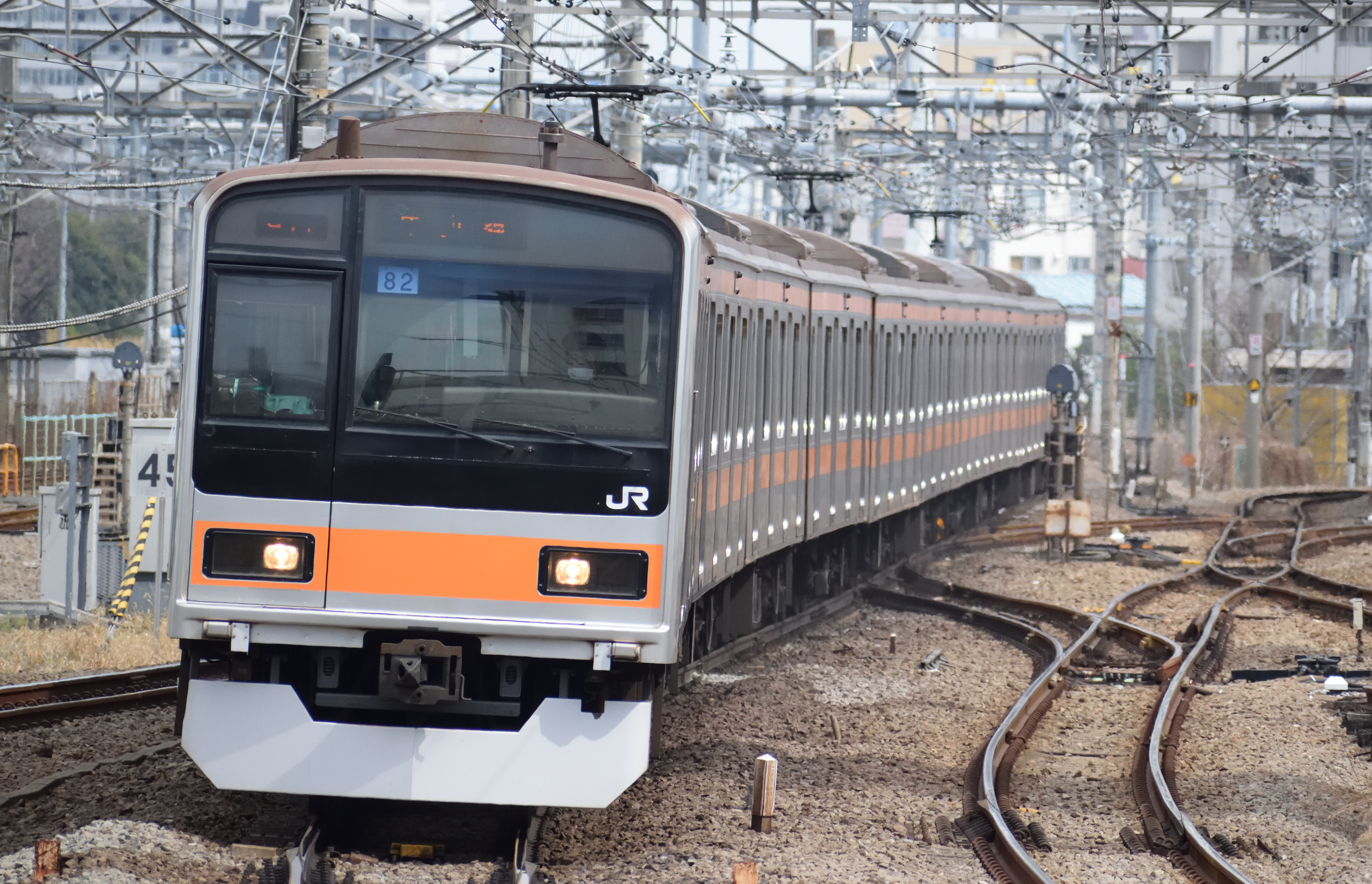
A 209–1000 series set on a Rapid service train for Toyoda, approaching Tachikawa

JR East planned to introduce green cars on both the Chūō Line (Rapid) and Ōme Line in spring 2025. To do so, two newly built bilevel green cars would be added to each 10-car and 6-car E233 series EMU set, forming 12-car and 8-car sets respectively. In addition, toilets were also installed in each trainset. Work was done to lengthen station platforms and depot facilities to handle longer trains. Two sets of 209-1000 series EMUs were placed into Chūō Line (Rapid) service from March 2019 to October 2024 as there were a temporary shortage of E233 series trains because of this work.

On 14 March 2020, the remaining few late evening and early morning local trains were converted to rapid service.

Through services to some lines in the Tama region were discontinued in the 2020s. Through services to the Hachikō Line and Itsukaichi Line ended on 11 March 2022 and the Holiday Rapid Akigawa (a holiday and weekend through service) was discontinued about a year later on 18 March 2023.

JR East announced the introduction of Green Car equipped trains from 13 October 2024 on a trial basis without additional fares. Full deployment (with fares) commenced in early 2025. It was reported in October 2025 that some passengers were using green cars without paying the proper step-up fare.

== Issues ==
=== Suicides and personal injury accidents ===
Personal injury accident reporting

The Ministry of Land, Infrastructure, Transport and Tourism requires all railway operators to keep track of and report any incidents. Some of what JR East has classified as a personal injury accident includes:

- Falling from the platform or entering the trackbed
- Any contact with the train while on the platform
- Being dragged while stuck in closed doors
- Suicide
- Purposefully pushing someone in front of an oncoming train
- Falling from the train
- Mechanical failure (such as parts falling off the train)

The Chūō Main Line and by extension, the Chūō Line (Rapid) service has a high rate of personal injury accidents. By 2000, the Chūō Line had the highest reported number of personal injury accidents (including suicides) in the JR East network. This morbid lore has also been represented in fictional works; the opening scene in the 2001 film, Suicide Club depicts the mass suicide of schoolgirls who jump in front of an oncoming Chūō Line train.

Between January 2010 and September 2025, there have been 483 of these incidents along the Chūō Line. Various causes have been discussed for this, including the lack of platform screen doors at most stations, the high rate of speed which trains travel at, and that JR East reportedly charges the lowest fees for railway damages to the families of those deceased (railway operators in Japan often seek financial compensation after personal injury accidents that result in costs to the company).

In response to this, JR East has made efforts to reduce the number of these incidents overall, including the installation of improved fencing at stations, reducing blind spots, adding blue lighting and mirrors at the ends of platforms, increasing lighting throughout stations, and having former staff patrol stations looking for those potentially in need. There are also plans to install platform screen doors at stations along the Chūō Line by fiscal year 2032.

=== Crowding ===
Measuring crowding levels

The Ministry of Land, Infrastructure, Transport and Tourism tracks ridership statistics and also uses a scale to measure rail passenger crowding:

- 100%: The train is at capacity, but a passenger can sit in a seat, hold on to a strap, or hold on to a pillar near the door.
- 150%: More crowded than full capacity, but passengers shoulders do not touch, people gathered near car doors.
- 200%: Passengers bodies will contact one another, people near the doors will have no space to move.

The Chūō Line serves a large portion of West Tokyo, and as a result, has historically experienced severe crowding. After World War II, a lack of space for further development of housing in central Tokyo led to a rapid build-up in formerly quiet areas, especially to the west. In turn, ridership on the Chūō Line also increased, and became a key corridor along these rapidly growing communities. Train lengths were increased to 10 cars by 1956.

In some cases, trains were operating at about 300% capacity, or three times the ridership that they were designed to safely carry. Conditions were so dangerous, the Chūō Line began to carry the nickname of the Murder Line. Beginning in the 1960s, JNR began making serious efforts to address overcrowding as part of its Commuting Five Directions Operation plan. The Chūō Main Line was quadrupled tracked and grade separated between Nakano and Ogikubo in April 1966, and later westward from Ogikubo to Mitaka in April 1969. This allowed the extension of Chūō-Sōbu Line service to Mitaka from its then terminus at Nakano to provide additional local service. In addition, the Tozai subway line was extended to Nakano in March 1966, and through-running service on the Chūō-Sōbu Line to Mitaka was introduced one month later, the first ever through-run service by JNR. JNR's efforts began to pay dividends: in 1965, crowding levels were at 266% above capacity, down from earlier post-war counts.

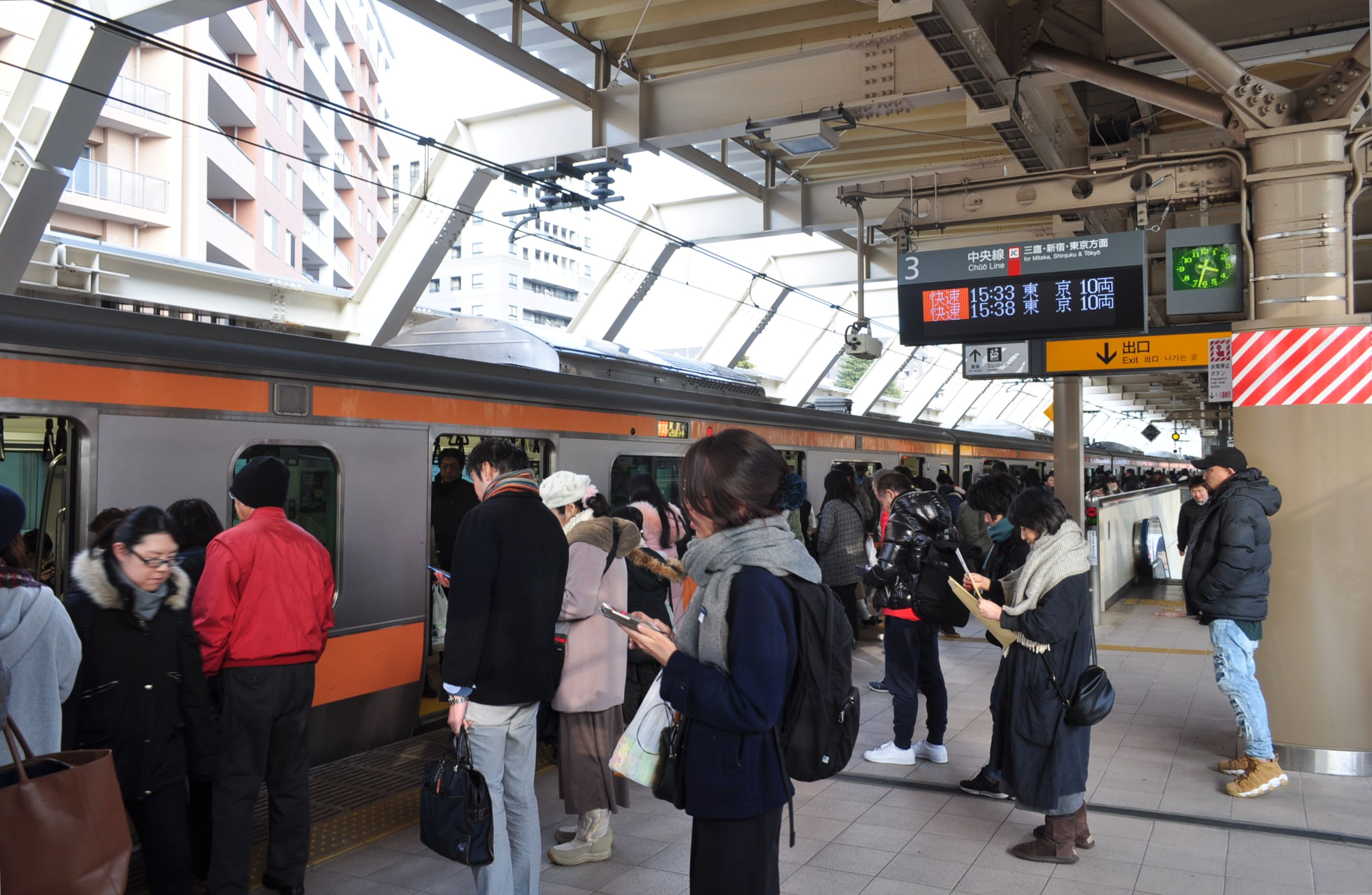
Passengers board a Chūō Line (Rapid) service train heading for Tōkyō at Kunitachi

In the years that followed, crowding levels decreased steadily as ridership dispersed across new alternative services - including the competing Keiō Takao Line. Ridership dipped to just below 120% during the height of the coronavirus pandemic and recovered modestly through the 2020s.

Ridership levels between Nakano and Shinjuku during the height of the AM peak
Year	Maximum Capacity	Actual Ridership	Crowding Percentage	Source
1955	33,950	95,030	280%	
1965	42,000	121,350	289%	
1975	39,200	102,100	260%	
1985	39,200	101,560	259%	
1995	42,000	95,600	228%	
1999	42,000	92,760	221%	
FY2017	44,400	81,560	184%	
FY2018	44,400	81,000	182%	
FY2019	44,400	81,550	184%	
FY2020	44,400	51,380	116%	
FY2021	44,400	53,090	120%	
FY2022	42,920	59,610	139%	
FY2023	41,440	65,510	158%	
FY2024	41,440	66,720	161%	

=== Service in Suginami Ward and Yamanashi Prefecture ===
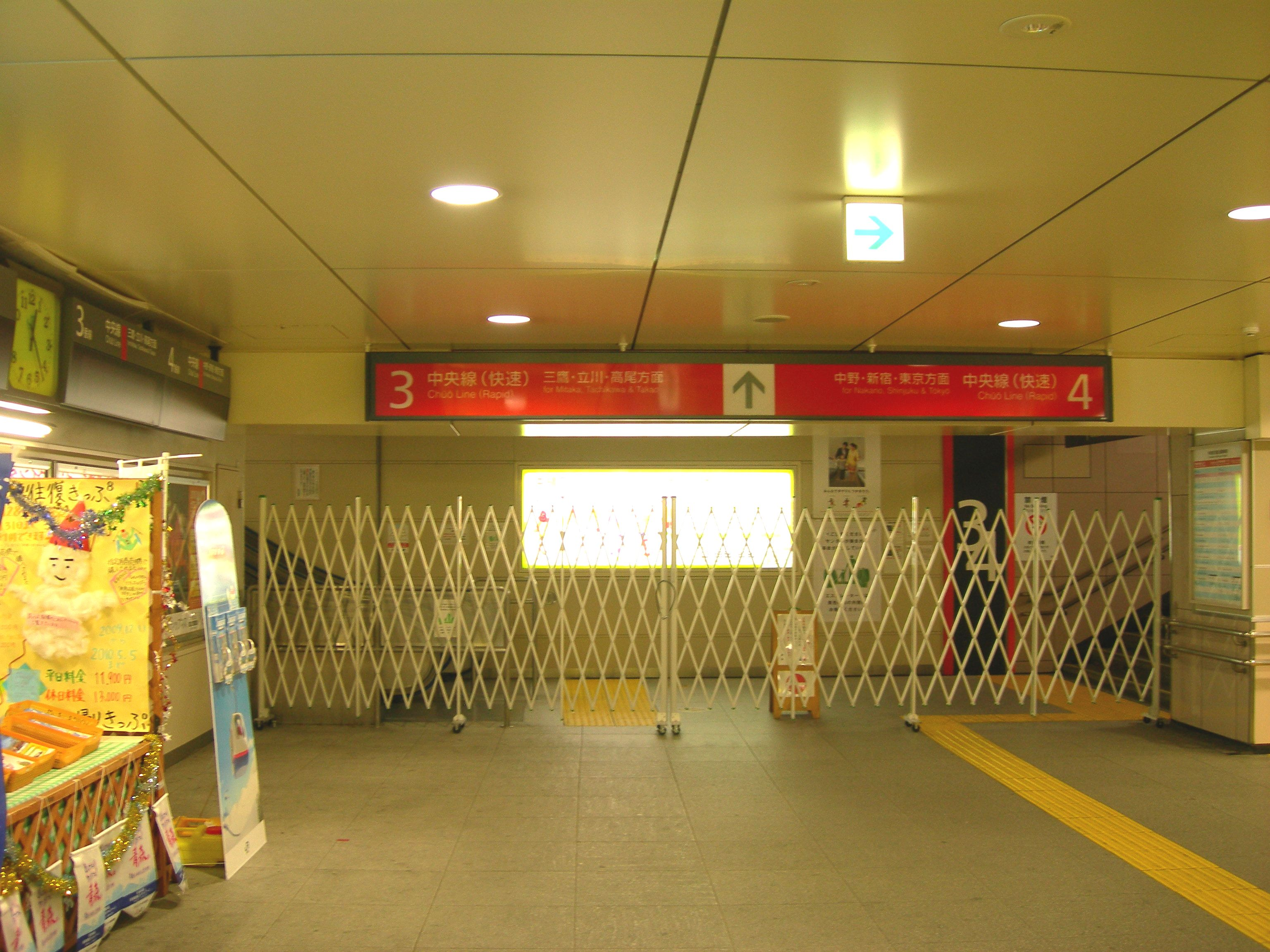
On weekends and holidays, all Chūō Line (Rapid) trains bypass Kōenji, Asagaya, and Nishi-Ogikubo. Platforms used by those trains are closed during these times.

On weekends and holidays, all Chūō Line (Rapid) trains are scheduled to bypass Kōenji, Asagaya, and Nishi-Ogikubo, all in Suginami. This has been a point of contention with the ward since the line was quadruple-tracked in the 1960s. During construction, initial plans did not include platforms to be built on the new rapid tracks. However, as a compromise with the local shopping districts and residents, the decision was made to build platforms at these stations. This was done in order to gain public support for the project. In 1969, JNR proposed that rapid trains would bypass the three stations on weekdays, but the proposal was shelved at the behest of the community. The Suginami government and JNR came to a memorandum of understanding, stating that rapid service trains would only stop on weekdays, and Saturdays, but not on Sundays or holidays. Trains bypassing on Sundays and holidays would be re-considered if the line between Mitaka and Tachikawa was quadruple-tracked.

After JR took control of the Chuo Line, an adjustment was made to align Saturday, Sunday and holiday schedules in December 1994. This meant the discontinuation of service on Saturdays, which was opposed by the ward. JR East justified their decision by pointing to changes in commuting habits that now aligned with a Monday-Friday workweek since that agreement was signed.

The Chūō Line is the only service that connects Yamanashi Prefecture and the rest of metropolitan Tokyo. The prefectural government critized the quality of service, claiming that long travel times have led to depopulation. They have advocated for expanded special rapid service to outlying stations.

== Service description ==
Diagram of Chūō Line (Rapid) service variants and other related services

Chūō Line (Rapid) trains generally operate between Tōkyō in Chiyoda and Takao in Hachioji or further out to Ōtsuki in Yamanashi Prefecture. Some trains also operate as a through service onto other lines: to/from the Ōme Line west of Tachikawa, or to/from Kawaguchiko on the Fujikyuko Line. JR East uses Chūō Line (Rapid), Chūō Rapid Line, or Chūō Line interchangeably to refer to the service.

The Chūō Line (Rapid) designation applies to a route, or a train service, and not to a physical right-of-way. Traveling west from Tokyo, trains operate along the following lines:

- Tōhoku Main Line from Tōkyō to Kanda
- Chūō Main Line from Kanda to Yoyogi
- Yamanote Line from Yoyogi to Shinjuku
- Chūō Main Line from Shinjuku to Ōtsuki

Chūō Line (Rapid) trains use the two express tracks on the four-track section between Ochanomizu and Mitaka. In turn, all Chūō Line (Rapid) trains operate express between Ochanomizu and Nakano, stopping only at Yotsuya and Shinjuku in between. Chūō-Sōbu Line trains run local in this section, and make all stops. Between Nakano and Mitaka, all stations have platforms on the express tracks, which allows Chūō Line (Rapid) trains to run local west of Nakano. West of Mitaka, trains use both tracks on the remaining double-track section.

There are also several distinct service variants, some making fewer stops than others, depending on the day and time.

Chūō Line (Rapid) weekday service at a glance
Service Type	Early AM	AM Peak	Midday	PM Peak	Evening	Late Evening
Rapid (快速)	Operates all day					
Chūō Special Rapid (中央特快)	Limited service in both directions	No service	Operates in both directions	Operates towards Tōkyō only	Operates in both directions	No service
Ōme Special Rapid (青梅特快)	Limited service in both directions	No service	Hourly in both directions	One trip to Tōkyō	One trip from Tōkyō	No service
Commuter Special Rapid (通勤特快)	No service	Operates towards Tōkyō only	No service			
Commuter Rapid (通勤快速)	No service			Operates from Tōkyō only		No service

=== Rapid service patterns ===
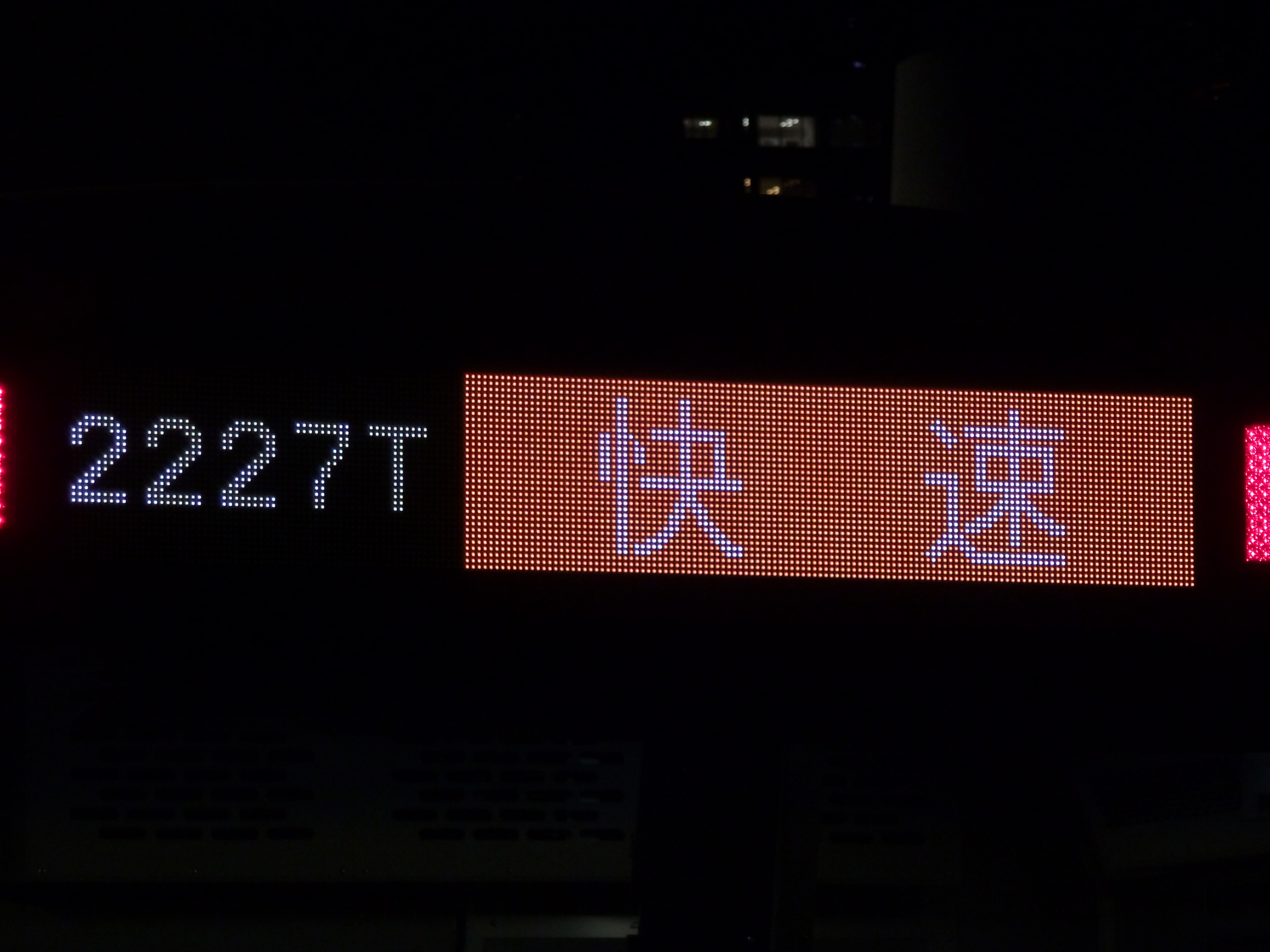
Headsign used for Rapid trains

==== Rapid (快速) ====
This is the most common service pattern on the Chūō Line, it operates all day, every day. On weekends and holidays, trains do not stop at Asagaya, Kōenji, and Nishi-Ogikubo. Most trains operate between Tōkyō, and Takao/Ōtsuki, though some trains may short turn at Musashi-Koganei, Tachikawa, Toyoda and Hachiōji, especially at the beginning or the end of the service day.

Some trains operate through to the Ōme Line (to as far as Ōme) or from Kawaguchiko (on the Fujikyuko Line) to Tōkyō during the AM peak, via Ōtsuki. Rapid service trains operate local west of Nakano. The service's signature color on service diagrams and on train sign programs is orange (■).

==== Chūō Special Rapid (中央特快) • Ōme Special Rapid (青梅特快) ====
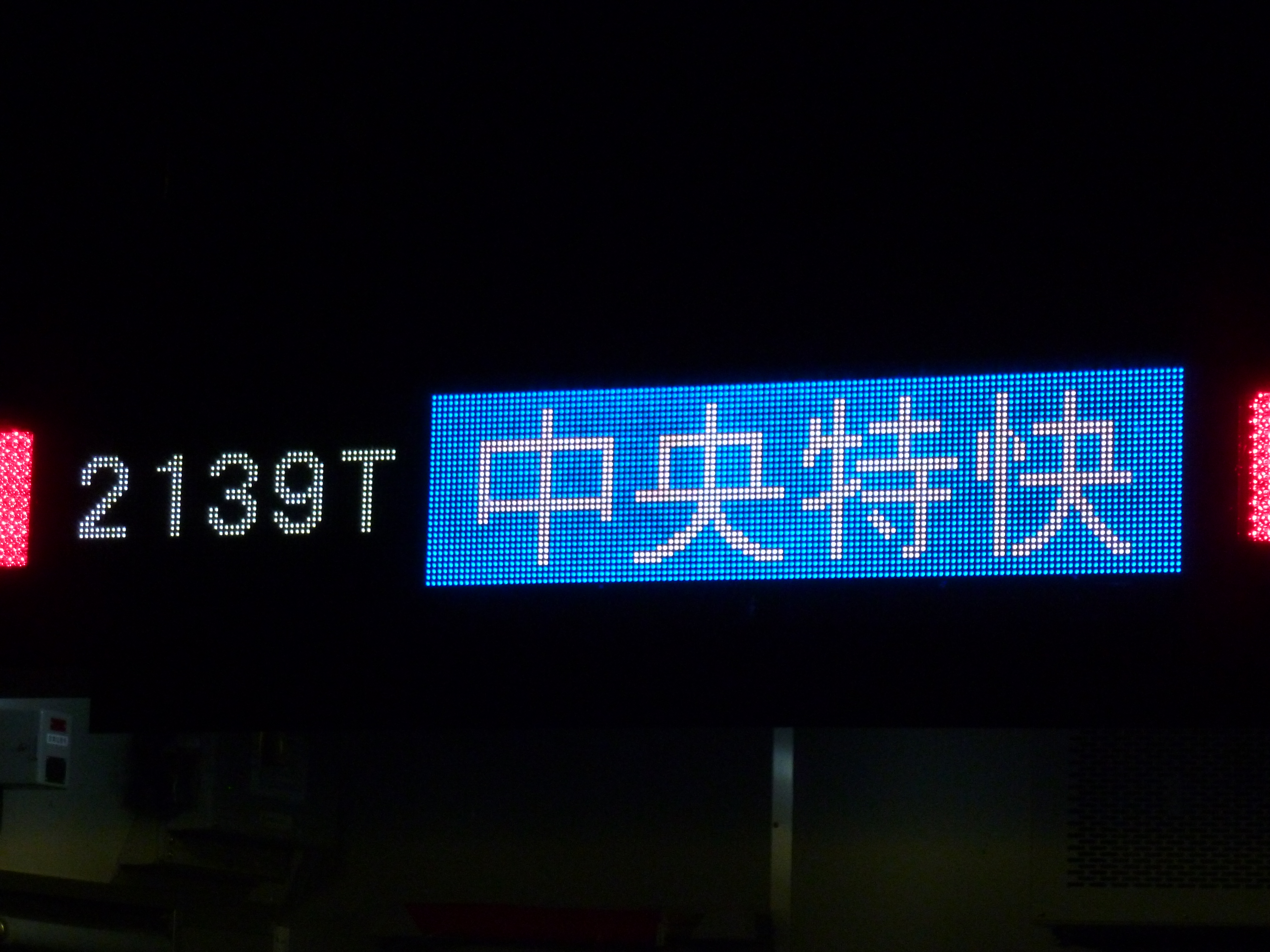
Chūō Special Rapid LED display

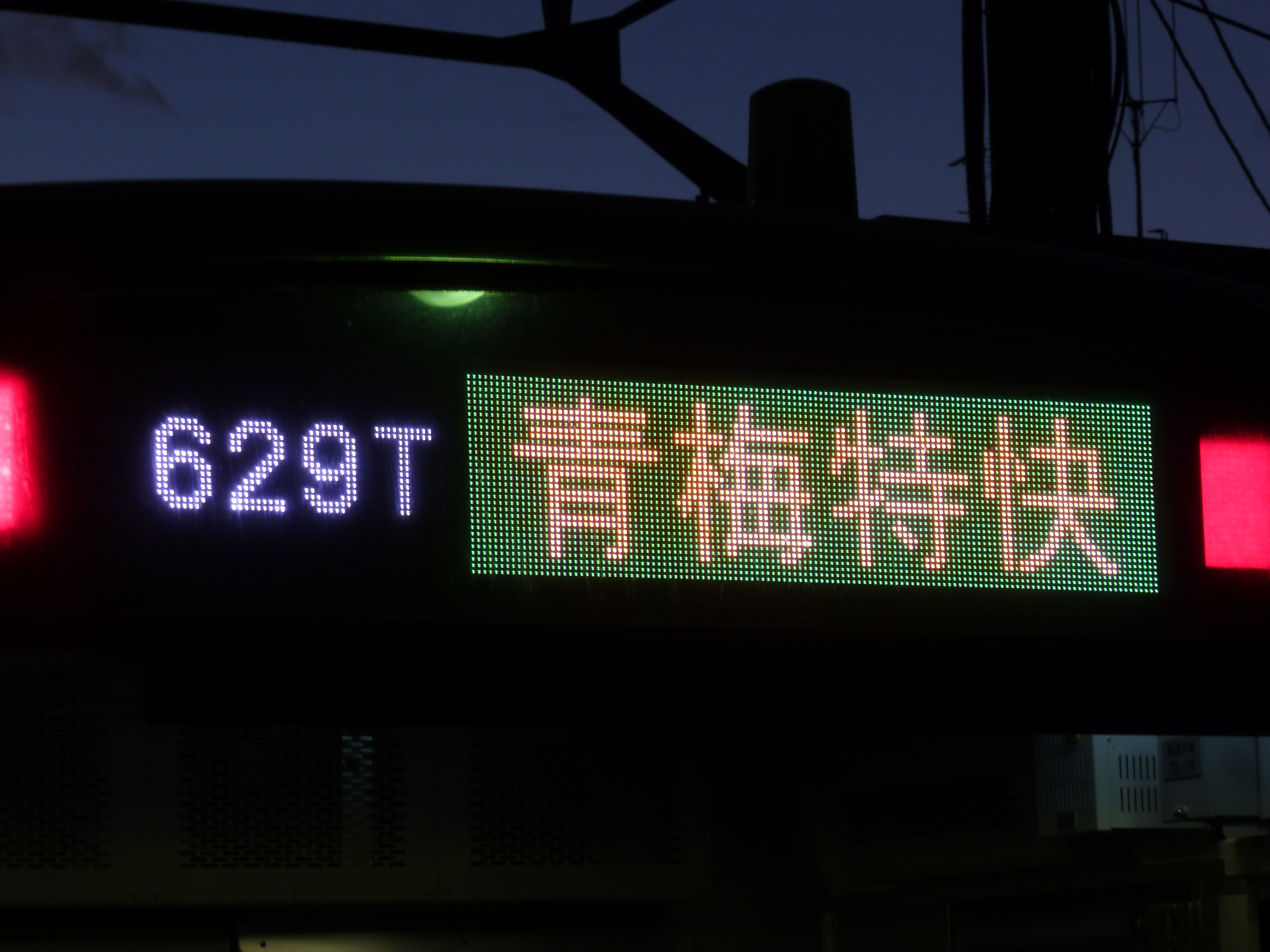
Ōme Special Rapid LED display

Both the Chūō and Ōme Special Rapids operate during off-peak hours on weekdays, and all day on weekends and holidays. Both make fewer stops between Tokyo and Tachikawa than standard Rapid service. These two services follow the Rapid service stopping pattern between Tōkyō and Nakano. West of Nakano, Special Rapid trains only stop at Mitaka, Kokubunji and Tachikawa. All trains run local west of Tachikawa.

Chūō Special Rapid trains remain on the Chūō Main Line to/from Takao or Ōtsuki, and a limited number of trains operate beyond Ōtsuki to/from the Fujikyuko Line towards Kawaguchiko. Chūō Special Rapid is shown in blue (■) on line diagrams.

The Ōme Special Rapid diverges at Tachikawa to/from the Ōme Line towards Ōme, stopping at all stations. It is shown in green (■) on line diagrams and train signage.

==== Commuter Rapid (通勤快速) ====
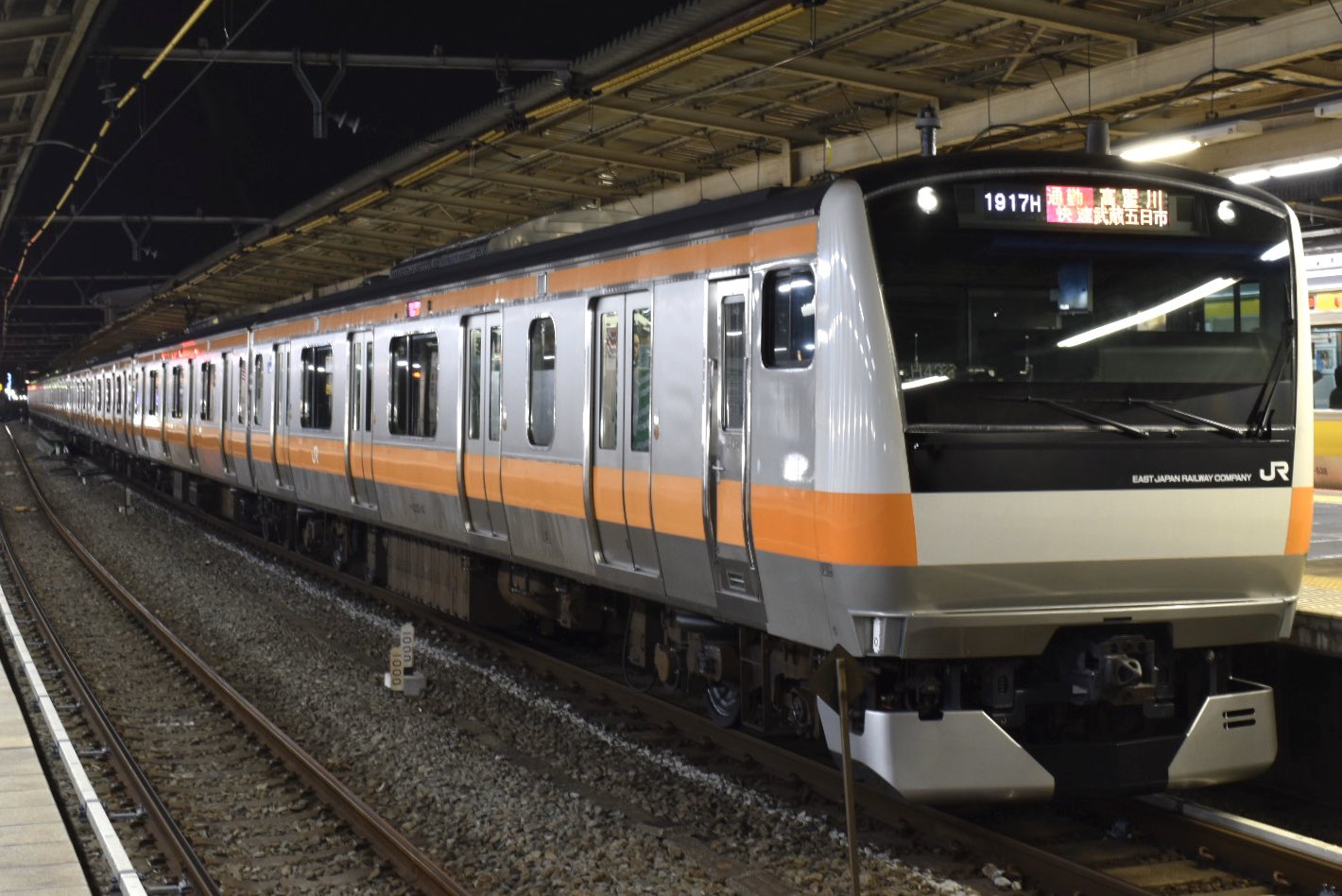
Commuter Rapid

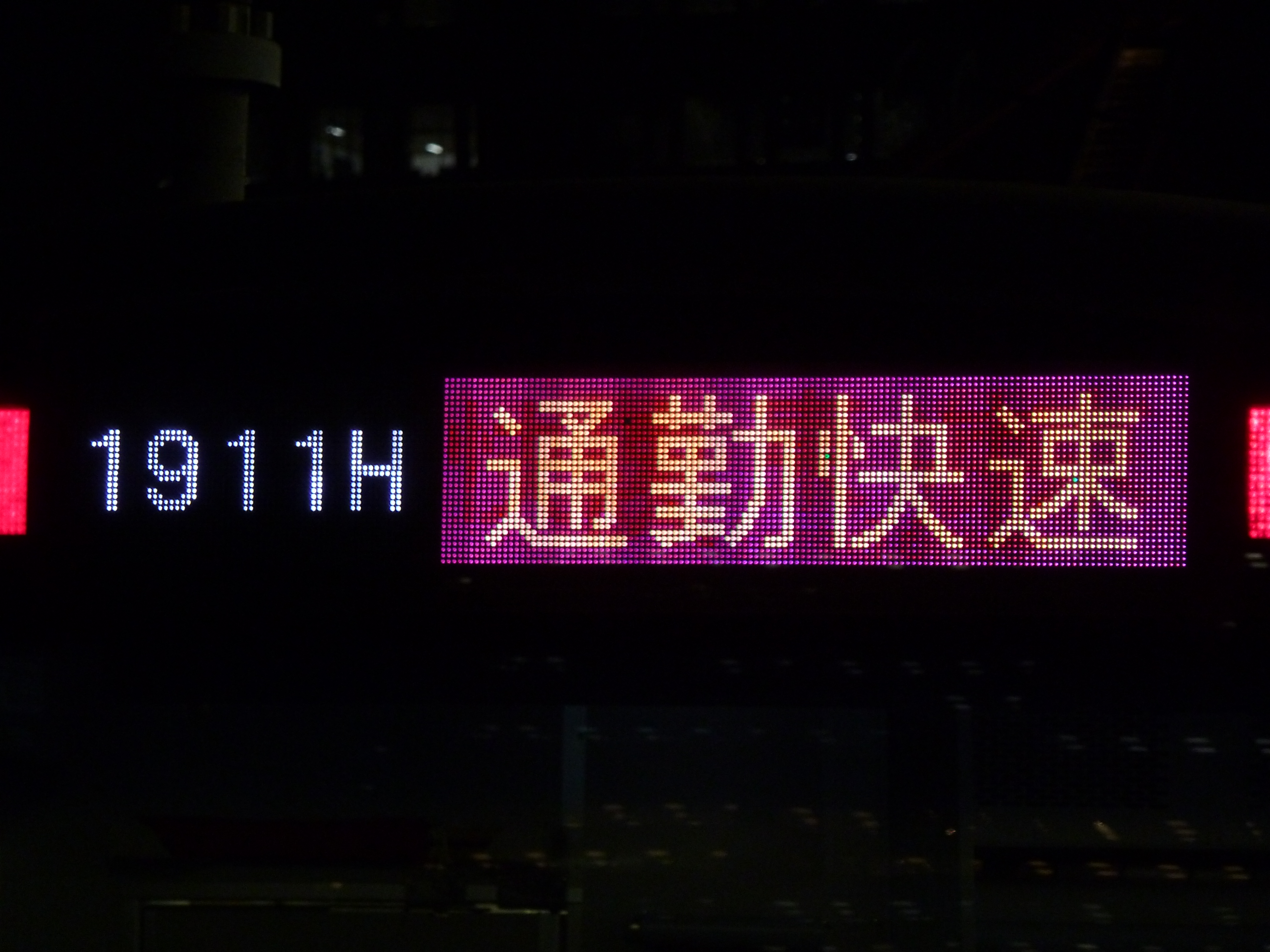
Commuter Rapid LED display

Commuter Rapid trains operate weekday afternoons and evenings, and they only run in the peak direction leaving Tōkyō. These trains serve all of the stops that Special Rapid trains would, but also stop at Ogikubo and Kichijōji.

They mostly terminate at Takao, though a few trains go further to Ōtsuki, or operate through services to Kawaguchiko on the Fujikyuko Line, or to Ōme on the Ōme Line. After Tachikawa, trains run local, and stop at all stations. The service's signature color on service diagrams and train signs is purple (■).

==== Commuter Special Rapid (通勤特快) ====
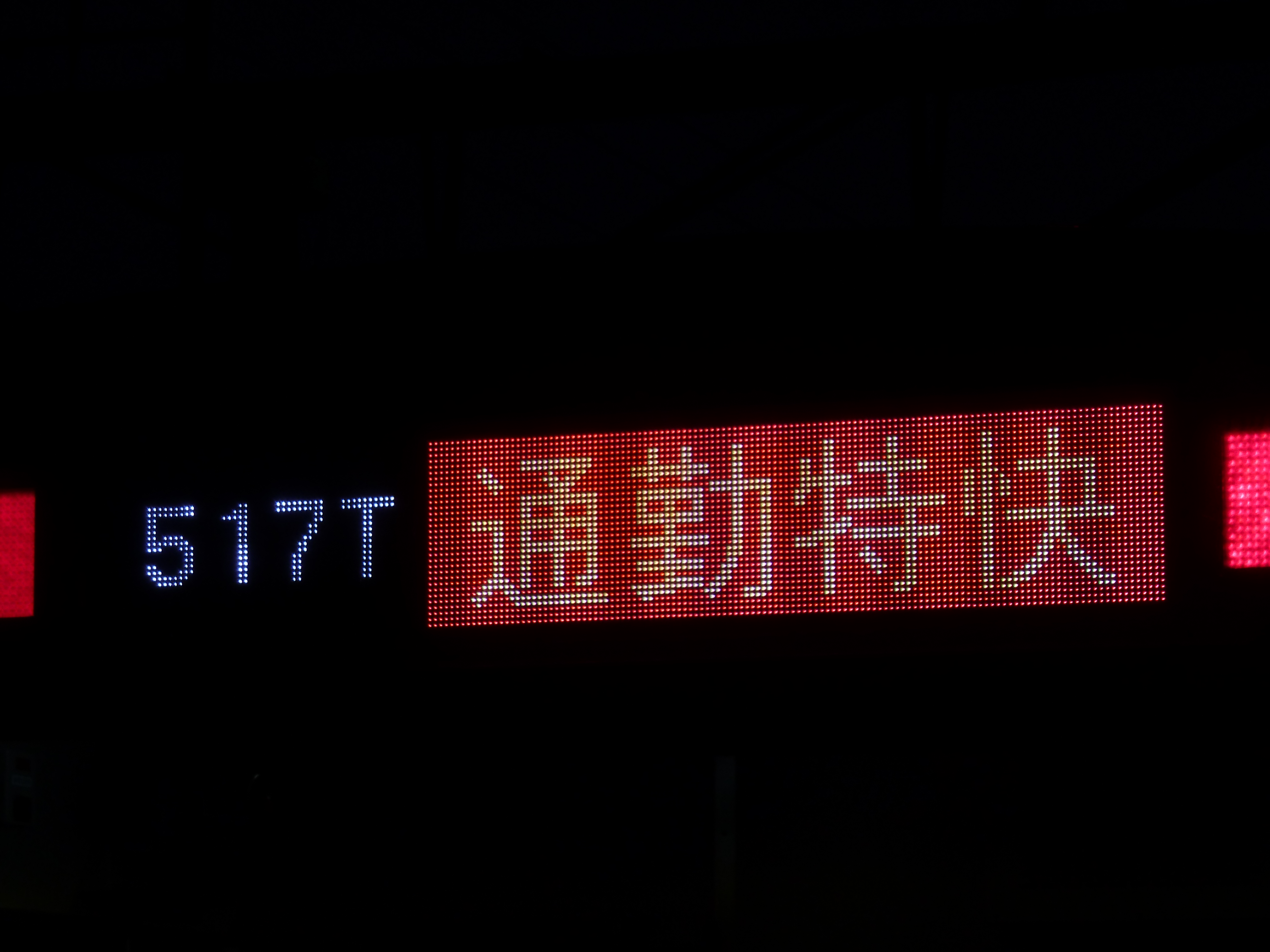
Commuter Special Rapid LED display

Commuter Special Rapid trains make the fewest stops of all the variants. This service only operates weekday mornings in the peak direction towards Tōkyō. Two of these trains originate from Ōtsuki, another two from Ōme on the Ōme Line, and an additional one from Takao.

Commuter Special Rapid trains run local until Takao, then stop only at Hachiōji, Tachikawa, Kokubunji, and Shinjuku and continues as a rapid service from Shinjuku. The service's signature color on service diagrams is red (■) and pink on train signage programs (■).

==== Holiday Rapid Okutama (ホリデー快速おくたま) ====
The Holiday Rapid Okutama is a special rapid service that operates only on weekends and holidays. It operates between Tōkyō and Ōme, following the Ōme Special Rapid stopping pattern east of Tachikawa. West of that point, trains run as a Rapid service along the Ōme Line, stopping only at Nishi-Tachikawa, Haijima, Fussa and Ōme. Three trains run in each direction: to Ōme in the morning and to Tōkyō in the afternoon.

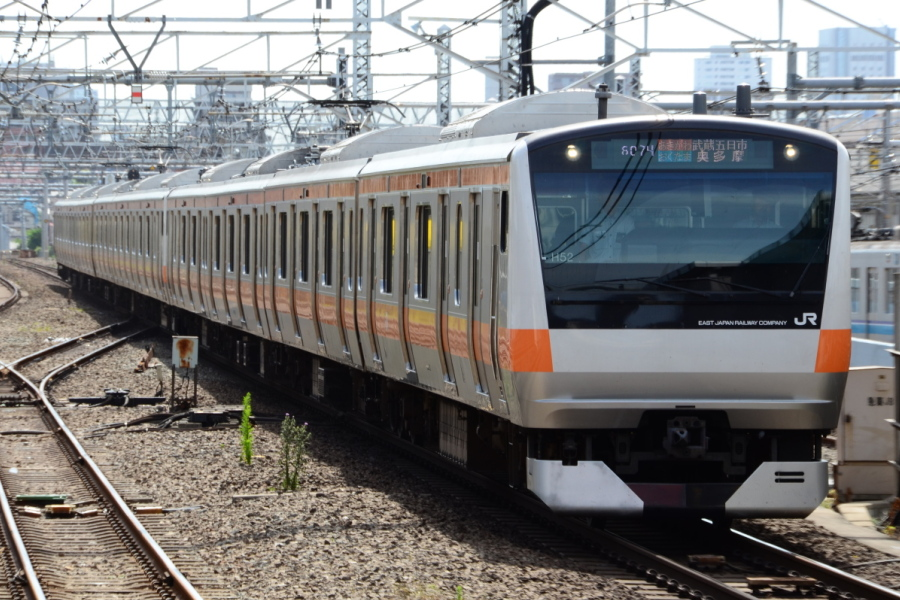
Holiday Rapid Okutama & Akigawa coupled together

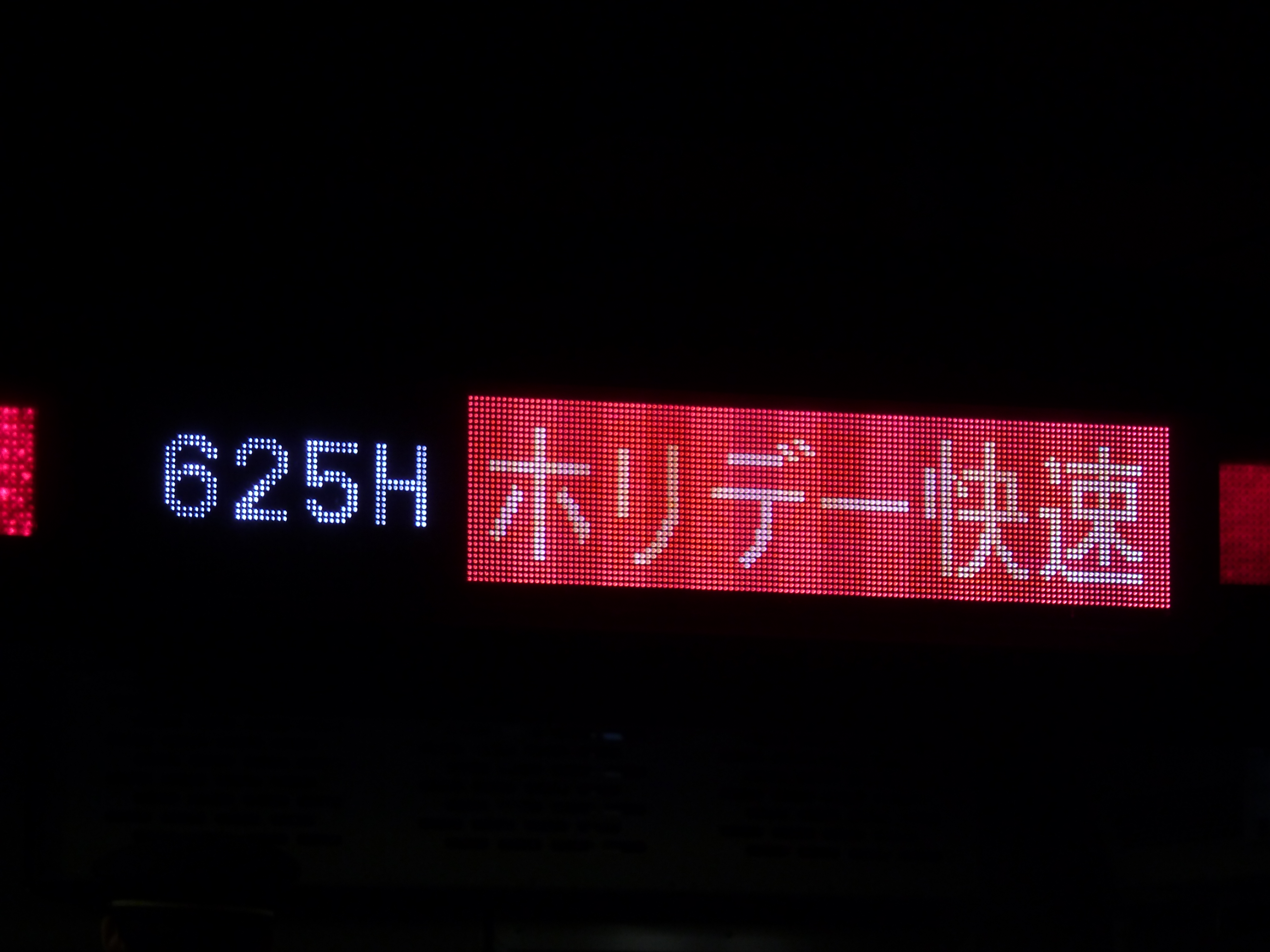
Holiday Rapid LED display

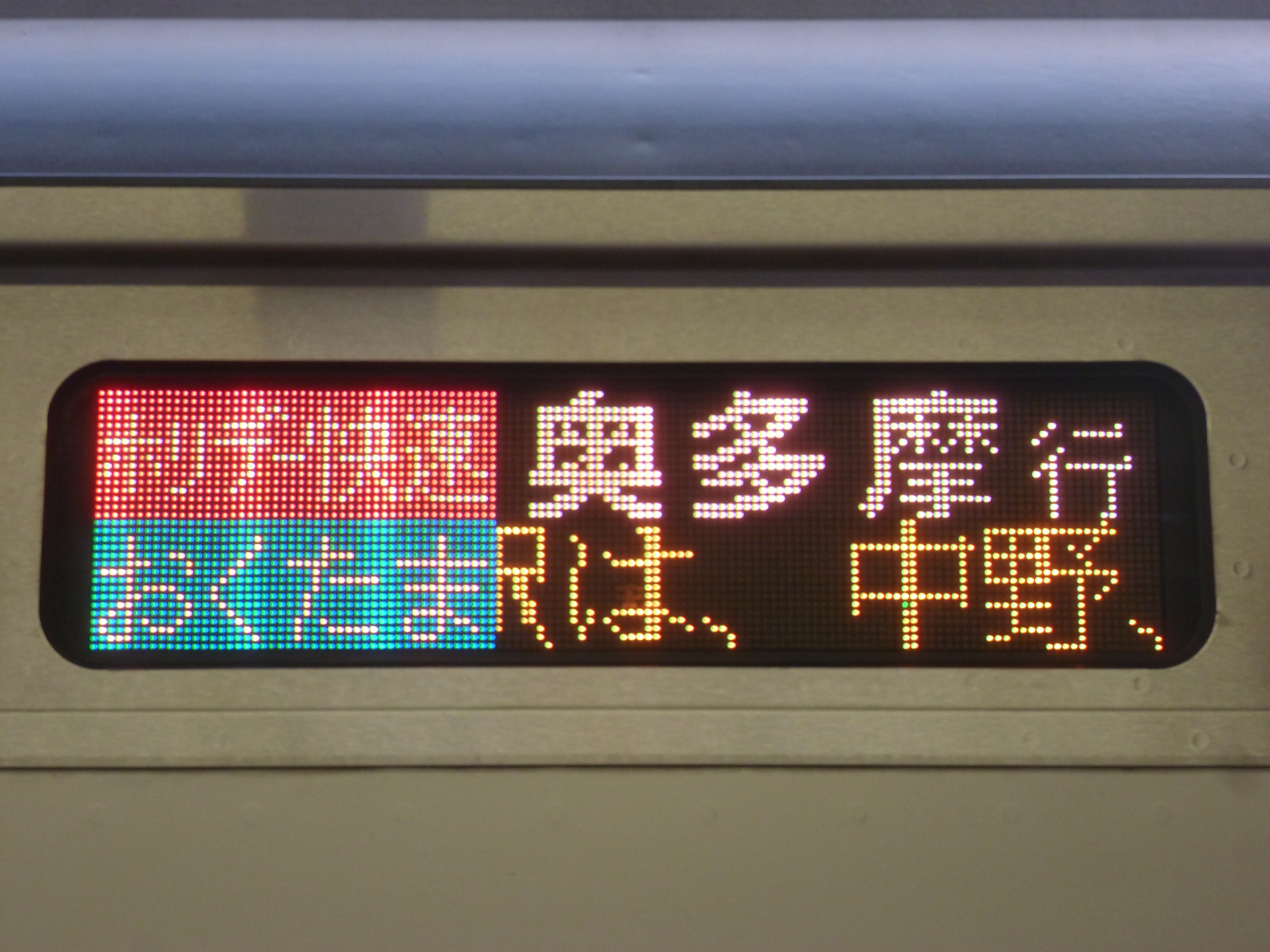
Holiday Rapid Okutama side LED display

=== Other services ===
==== Musashino (むさしの号) ====
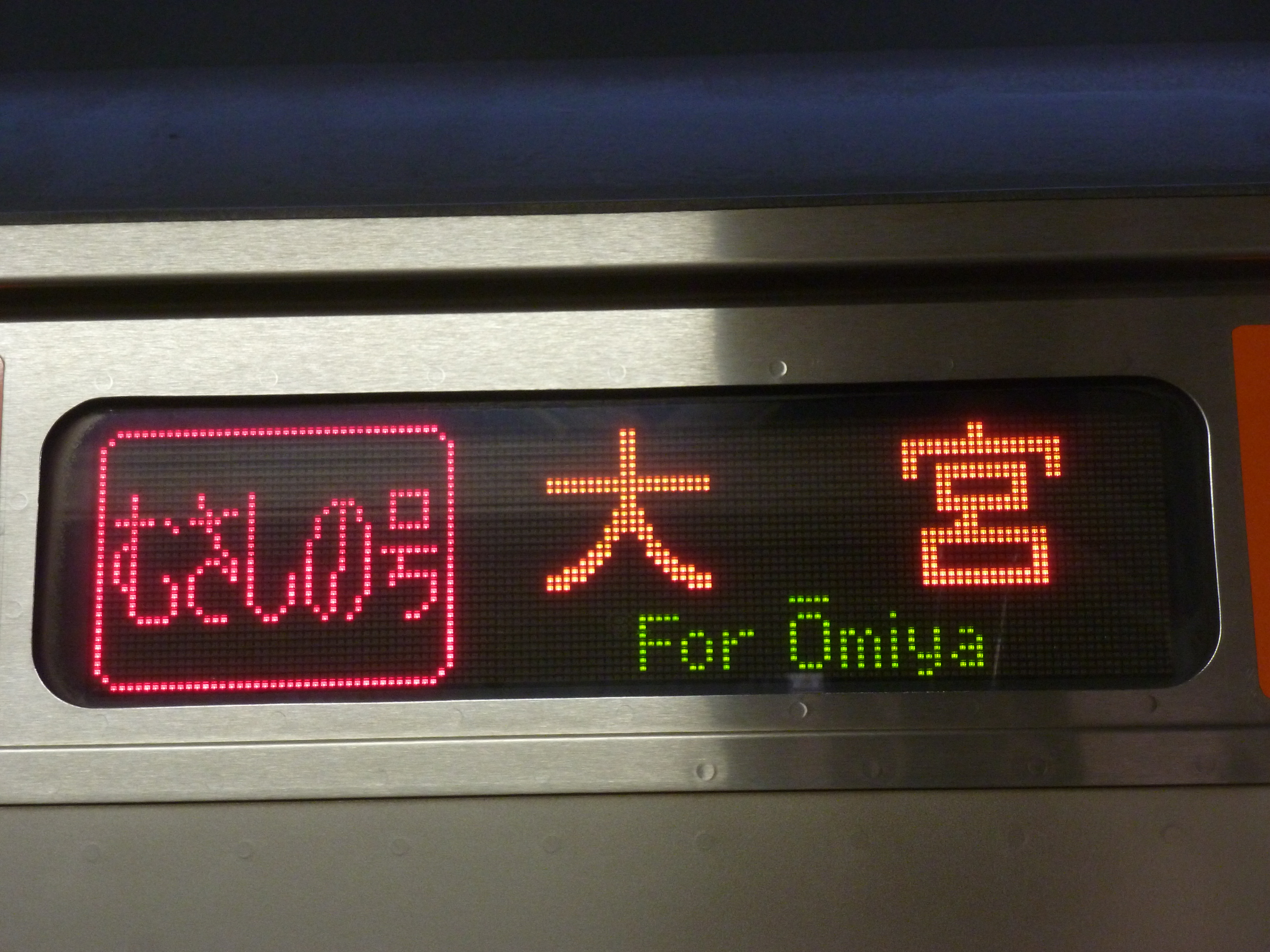
Musashino LED display

The Musashino is a local service train linking Ōmiya to Hachiōji via the Musashino Line. Services enter/exit the Chūō Line at Kunitachi by the freight branch, and runs local from Kunitachi to Hachiōji.

==== Limited express trains ====
There are several limited express trains that supplement Chūō Line service, they are the Azusa, Kaiji, Fuji Excursion, Hachiōji, and the Ōme.

=== Former services ===
==== Local (各駅停車) ====
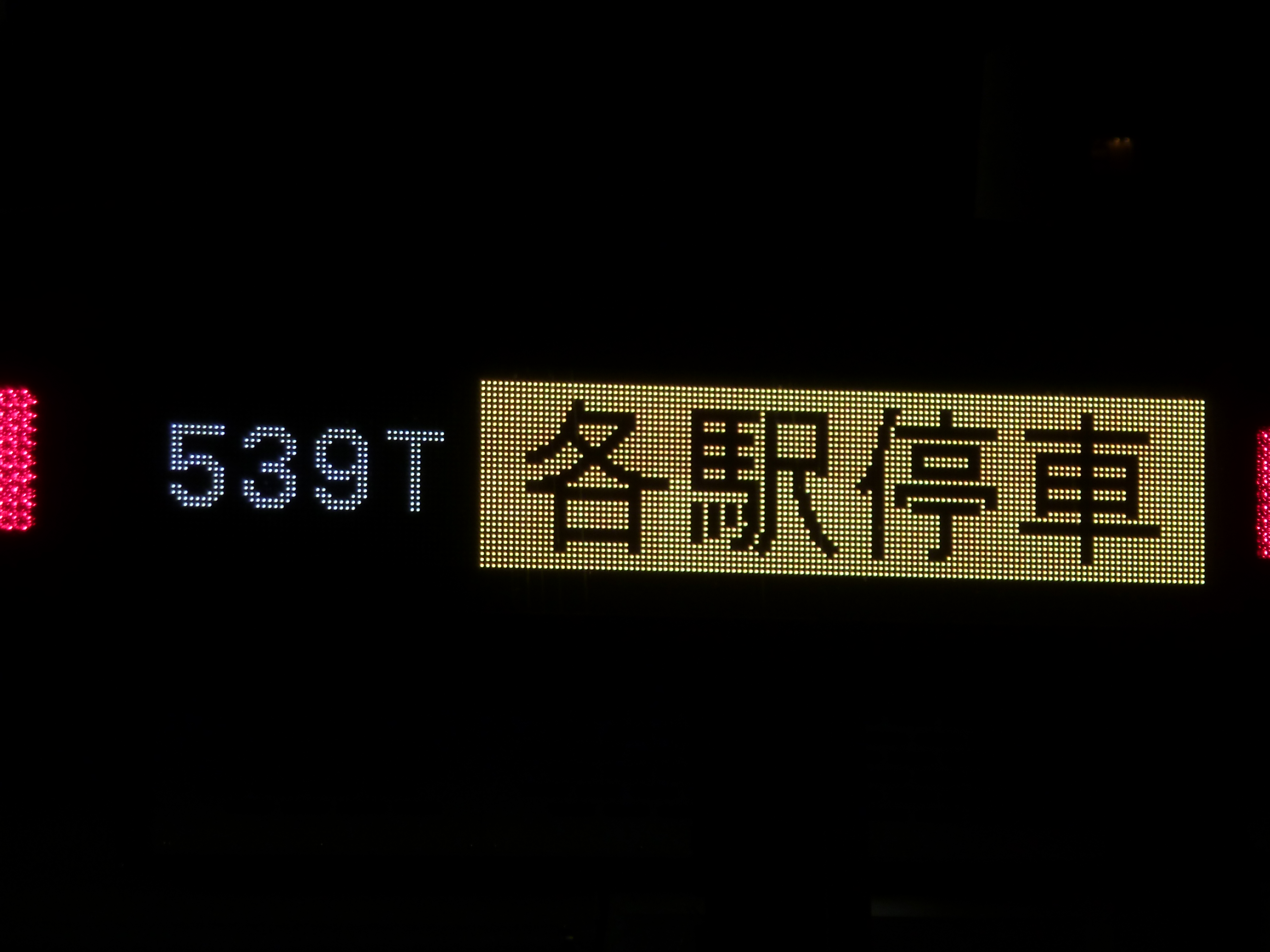
Local LED display

Prior to March 2020, some Chūō Line trains made all local stops at the beginning of service in the early morning, and the end of service in the late evening. Trains switched to and from the local Chūō-Sōbu Line tracks between Ochanomizu and Mitaka, and stopped at all stations. These trains made additional stops at Higashi-Nakano, Ōkubo, Yoyogi, Sendagaya, Shinanomachi, Ichigaya, Iidabashi and Suidobashi. During this time, Chūō-Sōbu Line local trains only operated between Ochanomizu and Chiba.

Most ran between Tokyo and Takao, but some westbound trains also short-turned at Musashi-Koganei, Tachikawa, Toyoda or Hachioji. A few trains also operated through to/from Ōme. The service's signature color on service diagrams is yellow (■).

Local trains also sometimes ran during daytime hours, namely during maintenance periods and emergencies.

To prepare for the installation of platform doors on the Chūō-Sōbu Line platforms and the future addition of Green Cars to the Series E233-0 fleet, local service ended on 13 March 2020. Chūō-Sōbu Line local trains were extended to Mitaka or Nakano during all hours of service.

==== Holiday Rapid Akigawa ====
The Holiday Rapid Akigawa was a special rapid service that previously ran in conjunction with the Holiday Rapid Okutama. A 10-car train would either split or combine at Haijima – six cars of the train would continue to/from Oku-Tama (as the Okutama), while the other four would continue to/from Musashi-Itsukaichi on the Itsukaichi Line (the Akigawa). This combined service was discontinued on 18 March 2023.

==== Itsukaichi Line and Hachikō Line through services ====
With the exception of the Holiday Rapid Akigawa, through services to the Itsukaichi Line (to/from Musashi-Itsukaichi, via Haijima on the Ōme Line) and Hachikō Line (to/from as far as Komagawa, via Haijima on the Ōme Line) operated until 11 March 2022.

== Station list ==
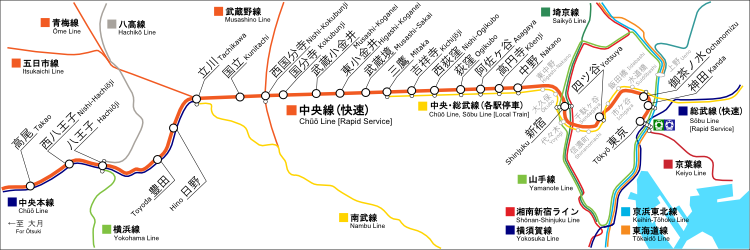

Station service legend
Symbol	What it means
●	Stops at all times during operating hours
｜	Trains do not stop here (↑ or ↓ indicates the direction of travel)
▲	Trains only stop here weekday mornings going towards Tōkyō (in the up direction)
▼	Trains only stop here weekday afternoons and evenings leaving Tokyo (in the down direction)
◆	Trains do not stop here on weekends or holidays

This list includes stations from Tokyo to Takao, where most service operates, for information on the Chūō Line west of Takao, please see the Chūō Main Line article.

Line	No.	Station	Disabled access	Distance (km)		Rapid	Chūō Special Rapid	Commuter Rapid	Commuter Special Rapid	Ōme Special Rapid	Transfers	Location
Line	No.	Station	Disabled access	Between stations	Total	Rapid	Chūō Special Rapid	Commuter Rapid	Commuter Special Rapid	Ōme Special Rapid	Transfers	Location
Tōhoku		Tokyo 東京	Disabled access	—N/a	0 (0)	●	●	▼	▲	●	Tokaido Shinkansen; Tōhoku Shinkansen (Hokkaido, Akita, Yamagata); Jōetsu Shinkansen; Hokuriku Shinkansen; Yamanote Line (JY01); Keihin–Tōhoku Line (JK26); Tōkaidō Line (JT01); Ueno-Tokyo Line (JU01); Yokosuka Line/Sōbu Line (JO19); Keiyō Line (JE01); Marunouchi Line (M-17)	Chiyoda, Tokyo
Chūō		Kanda 神田	Disabled access	1.3 (0.81)		●	●	▼	▲	●	Yamanote Line (JY02); Keihin–Tōhoku Line (JK27); Ginza Line (G-13)	Chiyoda, Tokyo
Chūō	JC03	Ochanomizu 御茶ノ水	Disabled access	1.3 (0.81)	2.6 (1.6)	●	●	▼	▲	●	Chūō–Sōbu Line (JB18); Marunouchi Line (M-20); Chiyoda Line (C-12 Shin-ochanomizu)	Chiyoda, Tokyo
Chūō	JC04	Yotsuya 四ツ谷	Disabled access	4.0 (2.5)	6.6 (4.1)	●	●	▼	▲	●	Chūō–Sōbu Line (JB14); Marunouchi Line (M-12); Namboku Line (N-08)	Shinjuku, Tokyo
Yamanote		Shinjuku 新宿	Disabled access	3.7 (2.3)	10.3 (6.4)	●	●	▼	▲	●	Yamanote Line (JY17); Chūō–Sōbu Line (JB10); Saikyō Line (JA11); Shōnan–Shinjuku Line (JS20); Odawara Line (OH01); Keiō Line (KO01); Keiō New Line (KO01); Shinjuku Line(SS01 Seibu-Shinjuku); Marunouchi Line (M-08); Shinjuku Line (S-01); Ōedo Line (E-27, E-01 Shinjuku-nishiguchi)	Shinjuku, Tokyo
Chūō	JC06	Nakano 中野		4.4 (2.7)	14.7 (9.1)	●	●	▼	↑	●	Chūō–Sōbu Line (JB07); Tōzai Line (T-01)	Nakano, Tokyo
Chūō	JC07	Kōenji 高円寺	Disabled access	1.4 (0.87)	16.1 (10.0)	◆	｜	↓	↑	｜	Chūō–Sōbu Line (JB06)	Suginami, Tokyo
Chūō	JC08	Asagaya 阿佐ケ谷	Disabled access	1.2 (0.75)	17.3 (10.7)	◆	｜	｜	↑	｜	Chūō–Sōbu Line (JB05)	Suginami, Tokyo
Chūō	JC09	Ogikubo 荻窪	Disabled access	1.4 (0.87)	18.7 (11.6)	●	｜	▼	↑	｜	Chūō–Sōbu Line (JB04); Marunouchi Line (M-01)	Suginami, Tokyo
Chūō	JC10	Nishi-Ogikubo 西荻窪	Disabled access	1.9 (1.2)	20.6 (12.8)	◆	｜	↓	↑	｜	Chūō–Sōbu Line (JB03)	Suginami, Tokyo
Chūō	JC11	Kichijōji 吉祥寺	Disabled access	1.9 (1.2)	22.5 (14.0)	●	｜	▼	↑	｜	Chūō–Sōbu Line (JB02); Inokashira Line (IN17)	Musashino
Chūō	JC12	Mitaka 三鷹	Disabled access	1.6 (0.99)	24.1 (15.0)	●	●	▼	↑	●	Chūō–Sōbu Line (JB01)	Mitaka
Chūō	JC13	Musashi-Sakai 武蔵境	Disabled access	1.6 (0.99)	25.7 (16.0)	●	｜	↓	↑	｜	Tamagawa Line (SW01)	Musashino
Chūō	JC14	Higashi-Koganei 東小金井	Disabled access	1.7 (1.1)	27.4 (17.0)	●	｜	↓	↑	｜		Koganei
Chūō	JC15	Musashi-Koganei 武蔵小金井	Disabled access	1.7 (1.1)	29.1 (18.1)	●	｜	↓	↑	｜		Koganei
Chūō	JC16	Kokubunji 国分寺	Disabled access	2.3 (1.4)	31.4 (19.5)	●	●	▼	▲	●	Kokubunji Line (SK01); Tamako Line (ST01)	Kokubunji
Chūō	JC17	Nishi-Kokubunji 西国分寺	Disabled access	1.4 (0.87)	32.8 (20.4)	●	｜	↓	↑	｜	Musashino Line (JM33)	Kokubunji
Chūō	JC18	Kunitachi 国立	Disabled access	1.7 (1.1)	34.5 (21.4)	●	｜	↓	↑	｜		Kunitachi
Chūō	JC19	Tachikawa 立川	Disabled access	3.0 (1.9)	37.5 (23.3)	●	●	▼	▲	●	Ōme Line (JC19; some trains through to/from Tokyo); Nambu Line (JN26); Tama Toshi Monorail Line (Tachikawa-Kita: TT11, Tachikawa-Minami: TT12)	Tachikawa
Chūō	Through service to/from the Ōme Line diverges											
Chūō	JC20	Hino 日野	Disabled access	3.3 (2.1)	40.8 (25.4)	●	●	▼	↑			Hino
Chūō	JC21	Toyoda 豊田	Disabled access	2.3 (1.4)	43.1 (26.8)	●	●	▼	↑			Hino
Chūō	JC22	Hachiōji 八王子	Disabled access	4.3 (2.7)	47.4 (29.5)	●	●	▼	▲		Yokohama Line (JH32); ■ Hachikō Line; Keiō Line (KO34 Keiō-Hachiōji)	Hachiōji
Chūō	JC23	Nishi-Hachiōji 西八王子	Disabled access	2.4 (1.5)	49.8 (30.9)	●	●	▼	↑			Hachiōji
Chūō	JC24	Takao 高尾		3.3 (2.1)	53.1 (33.0)	●	●	▼	▲		Chūō Main Line (JC24; some trains through to Ōtsuki); Takao Line (KO52)	Hachiōji
Through service continues to/from Ōtsuki via the Chūō Main Line or Kawaguchiko via the Fujikyuko Line
