= Musashi-Koganei Station =

Railway station in Koganei, Tokyo, Japan

JC15 Musashi-Koganei Station 武蔵小金井駅
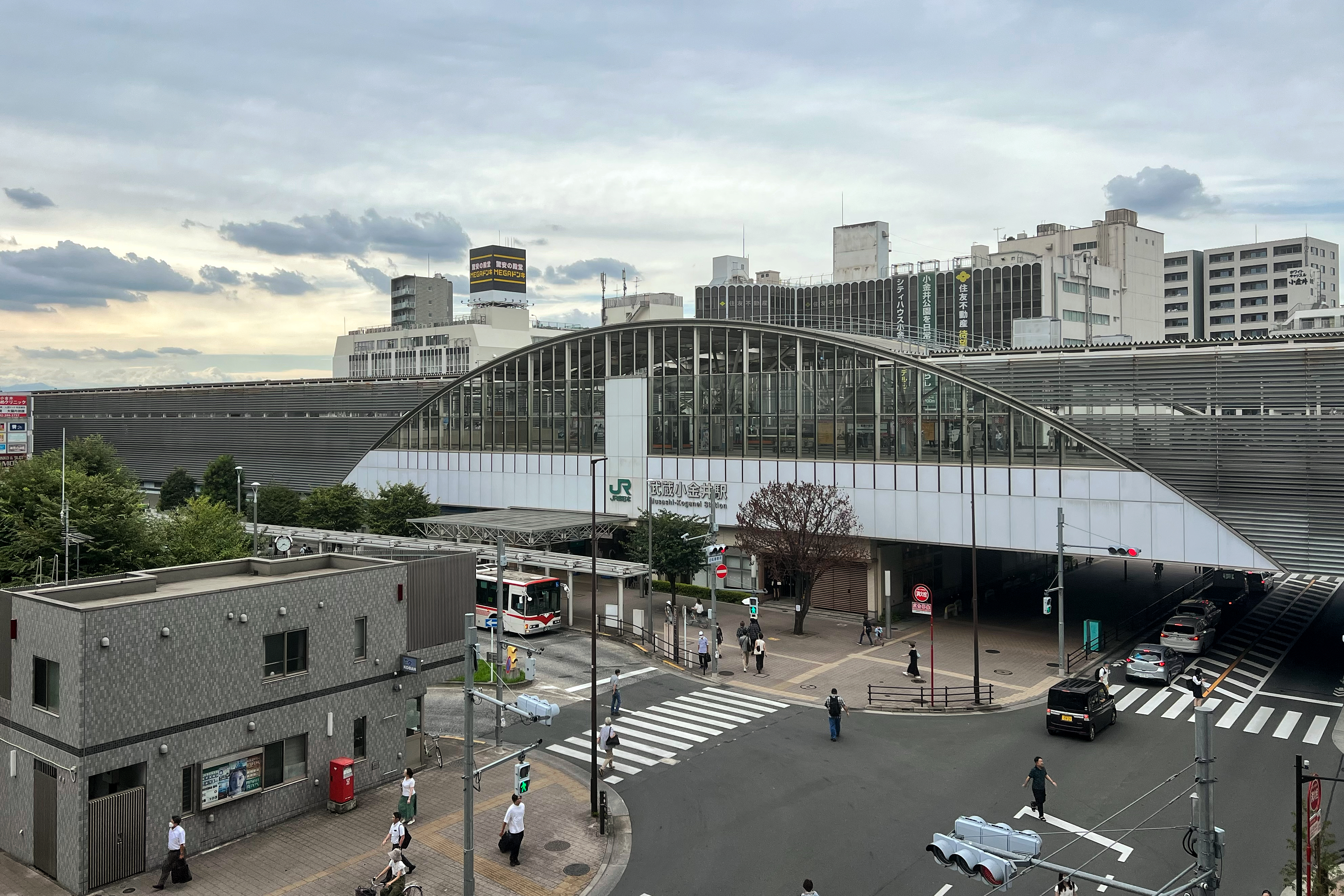
- The south side of Musashi-Koganei Station

General information
- Location: 6-14-29 Hon-cho, Koganei-shi, Tokyo 184-0004; Japan
- Coordinates: 35.701°N 139.506°E
- Operator: JR East
- Line: Chūō Line (Rapid)
- Distance: 29.1 km from Tokyo
- Platforms: 2 island platforms
- Tracks: 4

Other information
- Status: Staffed (Midori no Madoguchi)
- Station code: JC15
- Website: Official website

History
- Opened: 15 January 1926

Passengers
- FY2024: 113,426 (daily) ▲2.49%

Services
Preceding station	JR East	Following station
Kokubunji JC16 towards Ōtsuki	Chūō Line Rapid	Higashi-Koganei JC14 towards Tokyo
Location
- Location within Tokyo Location within Japan

Musashi-Koganei Station (武蔵小金井駅, Musashi-Koganei-eki) is a passenger railway station located in the city of Koganei, Tokyo, Japan, operated by East Japan Railway Company (JR East).

== Lines ==
Musashi-Koganei Station is served by the Chūō Line (Rapid), and lies 29.1 kilometers from the starting point of the line at Tokyo.

== Station layout ==
The station has two elevated island platforms serving four tracks, with the station building located underneath. The station has a Midori no Madoguchi staffed ticket office.

=== Platforms ===
1, 2	Chūō Line (Rapid)	for Tachikawa, Hachiōji, and Takao
3, 4	Chūō Line (Rapid)	for Shinjuku and Tokyo

The main platforms are platforms 1 and 4. Trains beginning service from this station usually use platform 3.

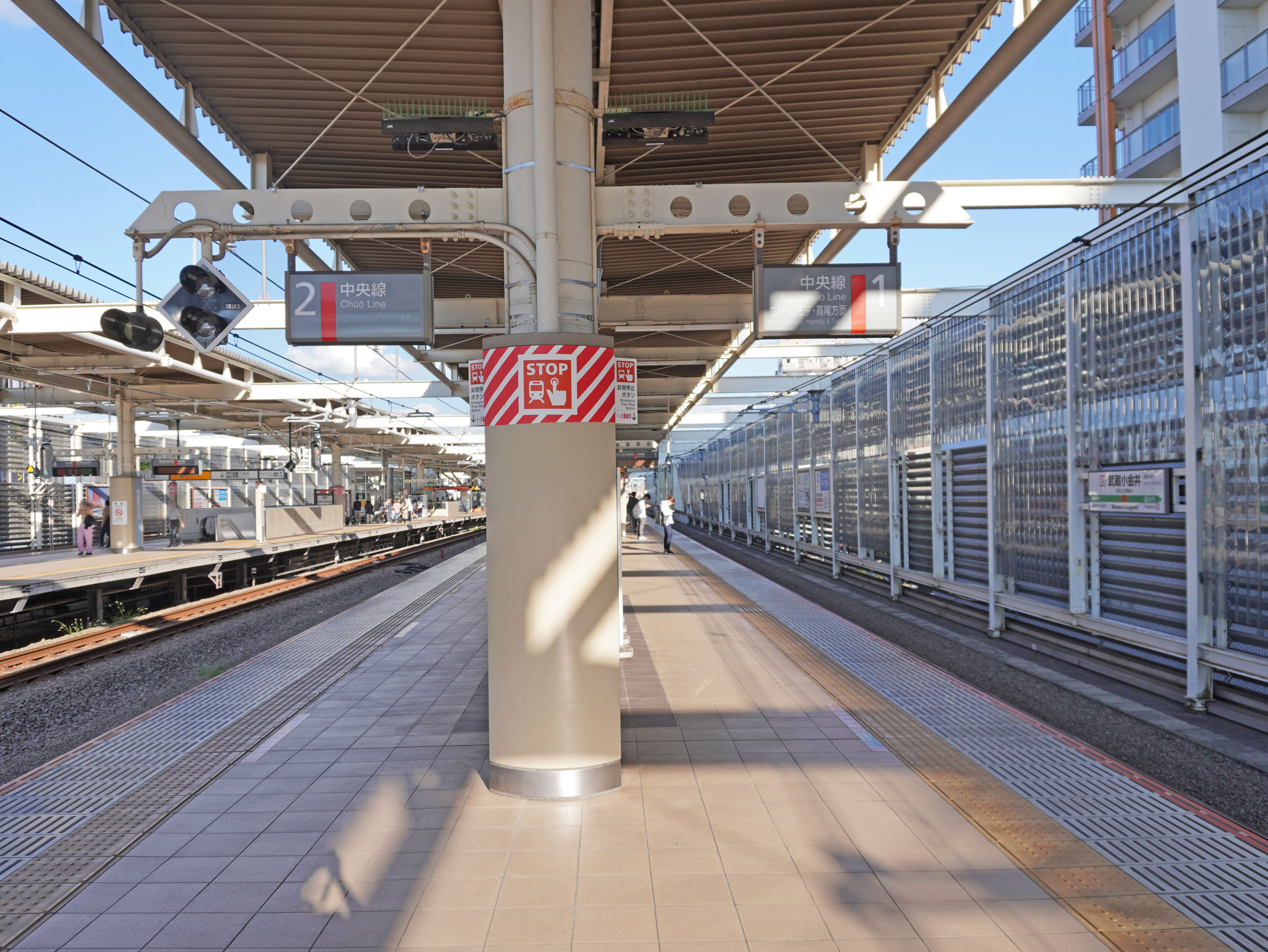
Platforms 1 and 2, October 2022

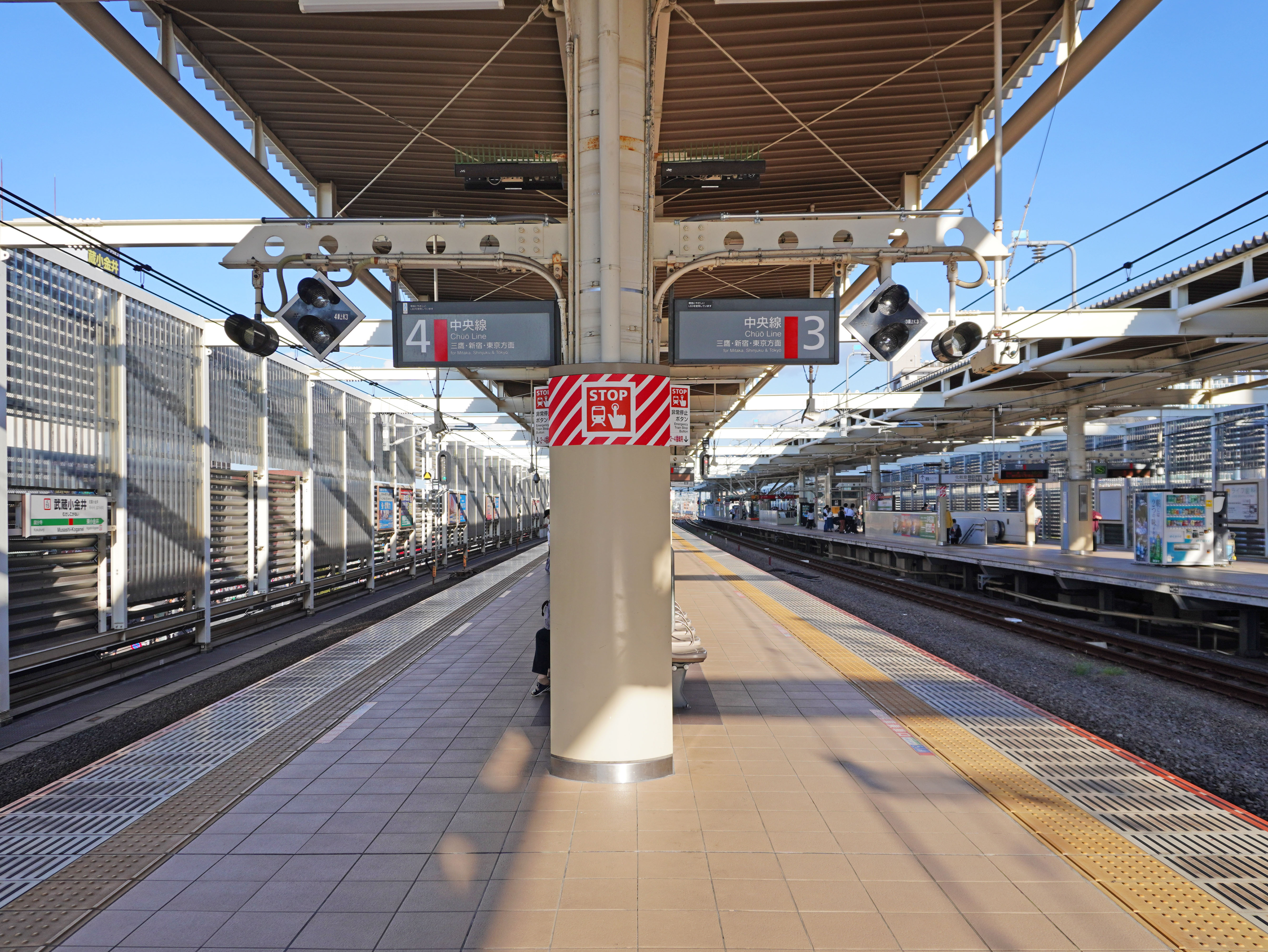
Platforms 3 and 4, October 2022

== History ==
The station opened on 15 January 1926. The station became part of the JR East network after the privatization of the JNR on April 1, 1987.

== Passenger statistics ==
In fiscal 2019, the station was used by an average of 62,565 passengers daily (boarding passengers only). The passenger figures for previous years are as shown below.

Fiscal year	Daily average
2000	54,579
2005	54,798
2010	56,544
2015	60,465

== Surrounding area ==
- Tama Cemetery
- Tokyo Gakugei University
- Koganei Park
- Edo-Tokyo Open Air Architectural Museum

== See also ==
- List of railway stations in Japan
