= Asagaya Station =

Railway station in Tokyo, Japan

Coordinates: 35.705°N 139.635°E

JC08 JB05 Asagaya Station 阿佐ケ谷駅
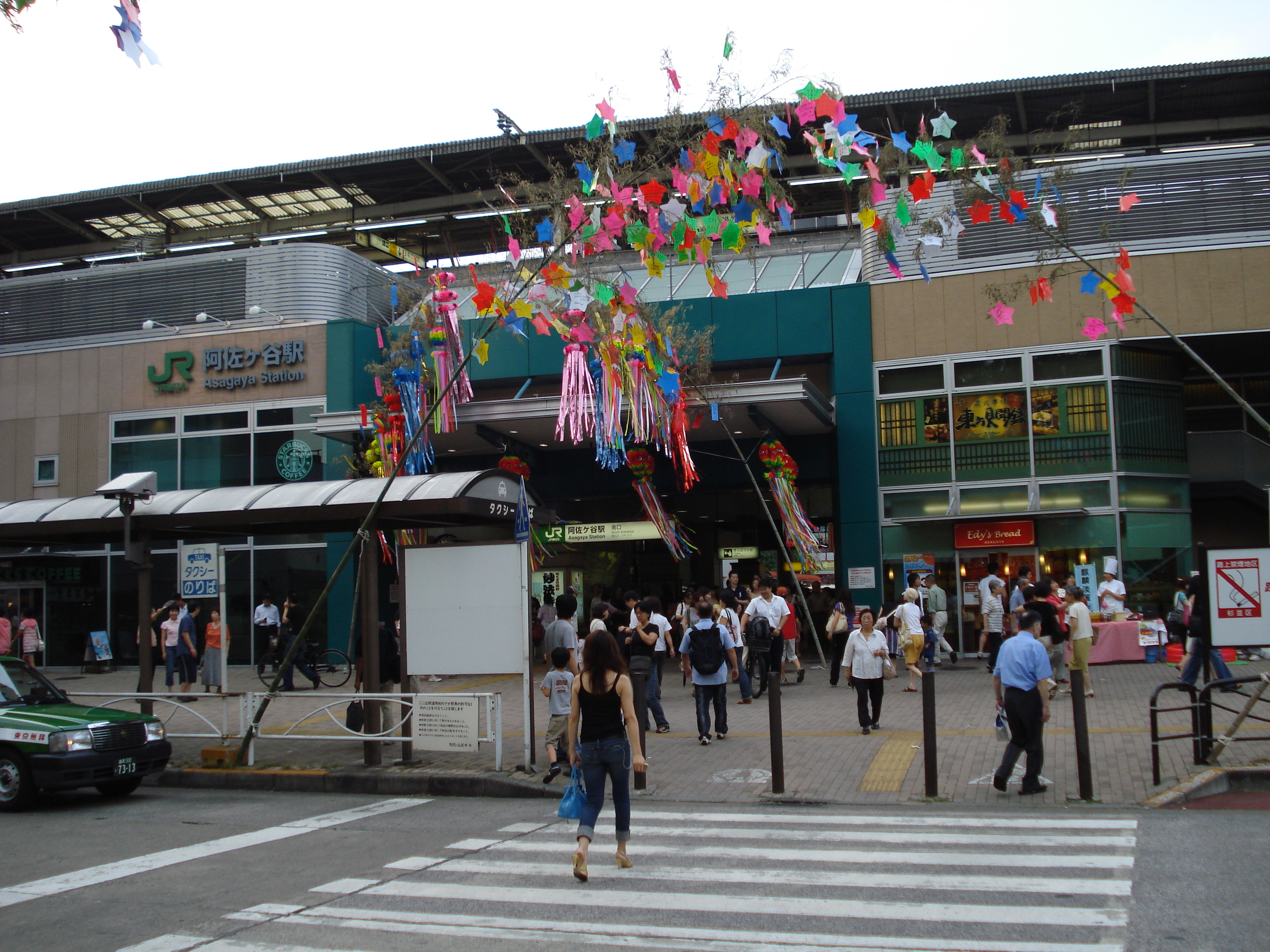
- Asagaya Station

General information
- Location: Suginami, Tokyo; Japan
- Operator: JR East
- Lines: Chūō-Sōbu Line; Chūō Line (Rapid)

History
- Opened: 1922

Passengers
- FY2024: 84,048 (daily)

Services
| Preceding station | JR East | Following station |
|---|---|---|
| Ogikubo JC09 towards Ōtsuki | Chūō Line Rapid (weekdays) | Kōenji JC07 towards Tokyo |
| Ogikubo JB04 towards Mitaka | Chūō–Sōbu Line | Kōenji JB06 towards Chiba |
| Ogikubo JB04 towards Mitaka | Chūō–Sōbu Line via Tōzai Line | Kōenji JB06 towards Tsudanuma |
Location

Asagaya Station (阿佐ケ谷駅, Asagaya-eki) is a railway station on the Chūō Main Line in Suginami, Tokyo, Japan, operated by East Japan Railway Company (JR East).

== Lines ==
Asagaya Station is served by Chūō-Sōbu Line local and Chūō Line (Rapid) services (not including special rapid services and other fast trains) of the Chūō Main Line on weekdays. On weekends, only local trains stop at this station.

== Platforms ==
| 1 | Chūō-Sōbu Line | for Mitaka |
| 2 | Chūō-Sōbu Line | for Shinjuku, Akihabara, and Chiba |
| 3 | Chūō Line (Rapid) | for Tachikawa, Hachiōji, and Takao |
| 4 | Chūō Line (Rapid) | for Nakano, Shinjuku, and Tokyo |

- Tracks 3 and 4 are closed on weekends as all Chūō Line (Rapid) train services pass through the station without stopping.

== History ==
The station opened on July 15, 1922.
