= Kōenji Station =

Railway station in Tokyo, Japan

Coordinates: 35°42′19″N 139°38′58″E

JC07 JB06 Koenji Station 高円寺駅
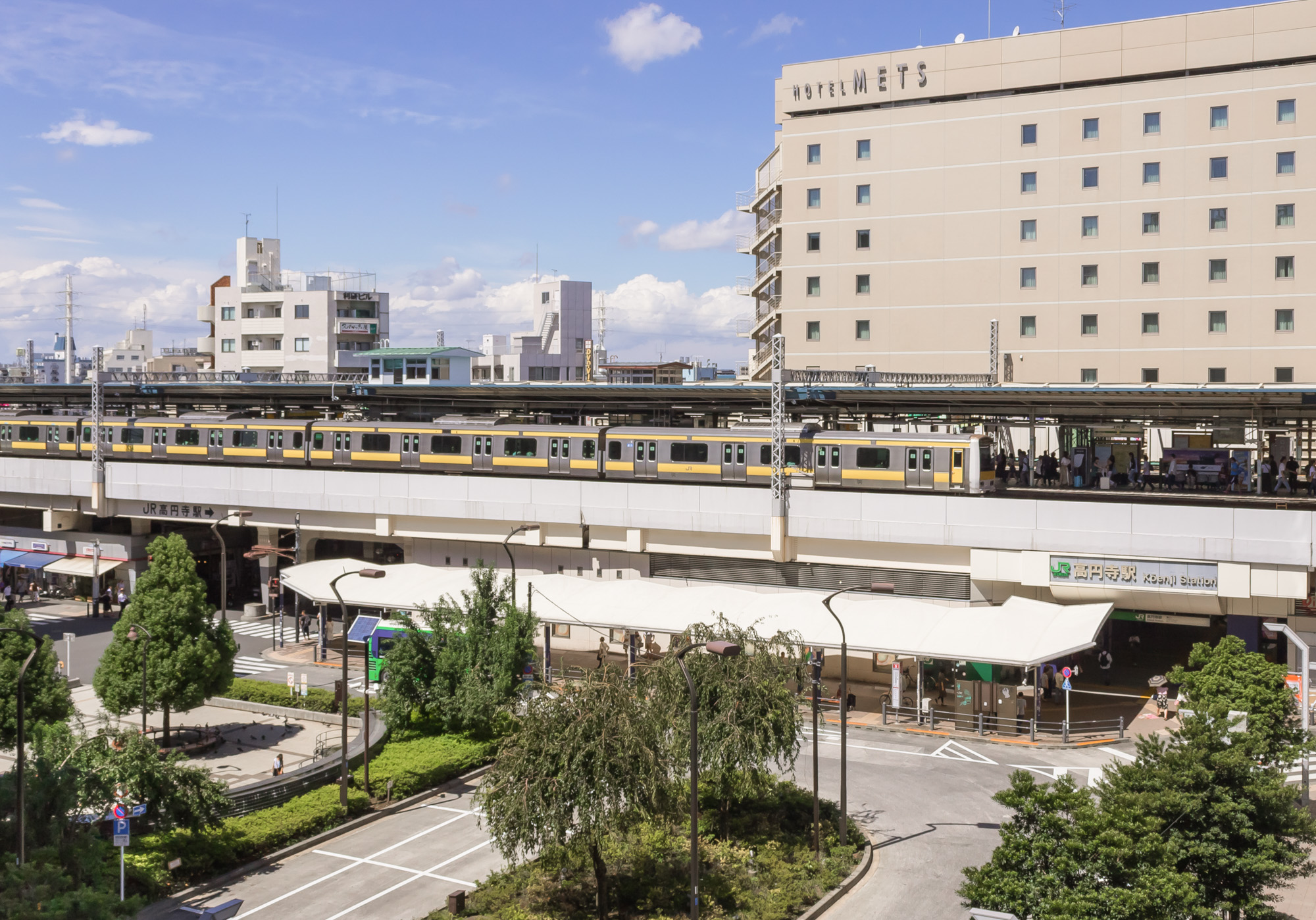

Japanese name
- Shinjitai: 高円寺駅
- Kyūjitai: 高圓寺驛
- Hiragana: こうえんじえき

General information
- Location: 48-2 Koenji-Minami 4-chome, Suginami City, Tokyo; Japan
- Operator: JR East
- Line: Chūō Main Line
- Platforms: 2 island platforms
- Tracks: 4
- Connections: Bus Terminal

Construction
- Structure type: Elevated

History
- Opened: 15 July 1922; 104 years ago

Passengers
- FY2024: 95,432 (daily)

Services
Preceding station	JR East	Following station
Asagaya JC08 towards Ōtsuki	Chūō Line Rapid (weekdays)	Nakano JC06 towards Tokyo
Asagaya JB05 towards Mitaka	Chūō–Sōbu Line	Nakano JB07 towards Chiba
Asagaya JB05 towards Mitaka	Chūō–Sōbu Line via Tōzai Line	Nakano JB07 towards Tsudanuma
Location

Kōenji Station (高円寺駅, Kōenji-eki) is a railway station on the Chūō Main Line in the Kōenji neighborhood in Suginami, Tokyo. The station, on a four-track section, is served by local and rapid services (not including special rapid services and other fast trains) of the Chūō Main Line on weekdays. On weekends, only local trains make stops at this station.

The station uses a special train departure melody during the Koenji Awa Odori festival held in late August.

It is within walking distance of Shin-Kōenji Station on the Tokyo Metro Marunouchi Line.

The Number of Passengers on Kōenji as recorded by the East Japan Railway Company Trains in 2017-2022 was 14,618 (（単位 千人）).

== History ==
The station began operation on July 15, 1922. The original station building was destroyed in the bombing of Tokyo in 1945 and a permanent replacement was completed in 1952. The Chuo Line tracks originally ran at ground level but were fully elevated in April 1966, when through service to the Sobu Line and the Tozai Line commenced.

== Line ==
- East Japan Railway Company (JR East) Chūō Line

== Platforms ==
1	Chūō-Sōbu Line	for Mitaka
2	Chūō-Sōbu Line	for Shinjuku, Akihabara, and Chiba
3	Chūō Line (Rapid)	for Tachikawa, Hachiōji, and Takao
4	Chūō Line (Rapid)	for Nakano, Shinjuku, and Tokyo
