= Misso Parish =

Former municipality of Estonia

Coordinates: 57°36′2″N 27°13′43″E

Misso Parish Misso vald (in Estonian) Miss'o vald (in Võro)
- Former municipality of Estonia
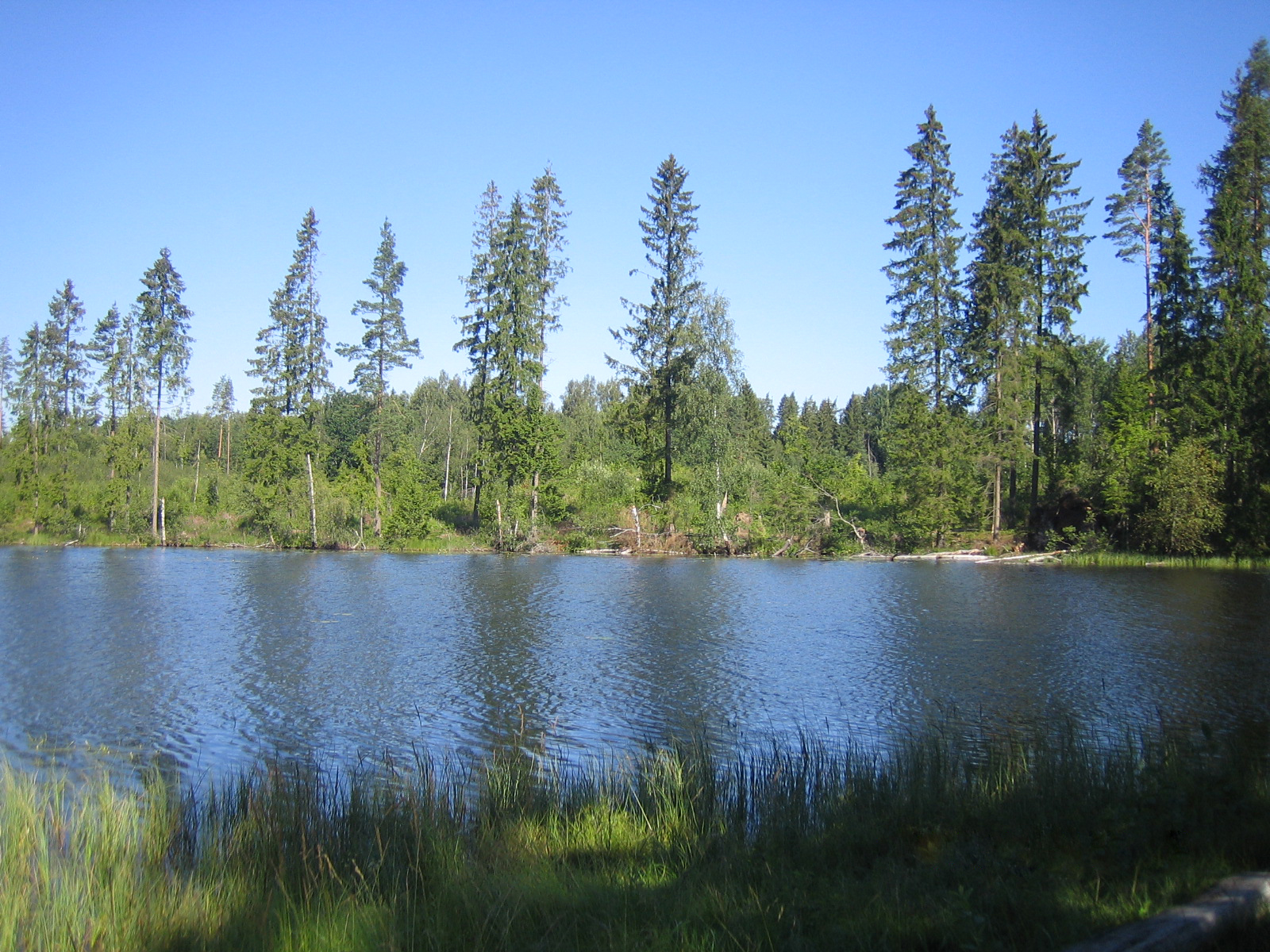
- Põrstõ lake

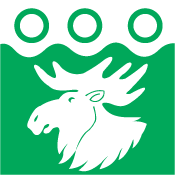
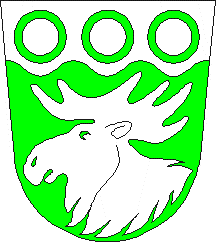
- Flag Coat of arms

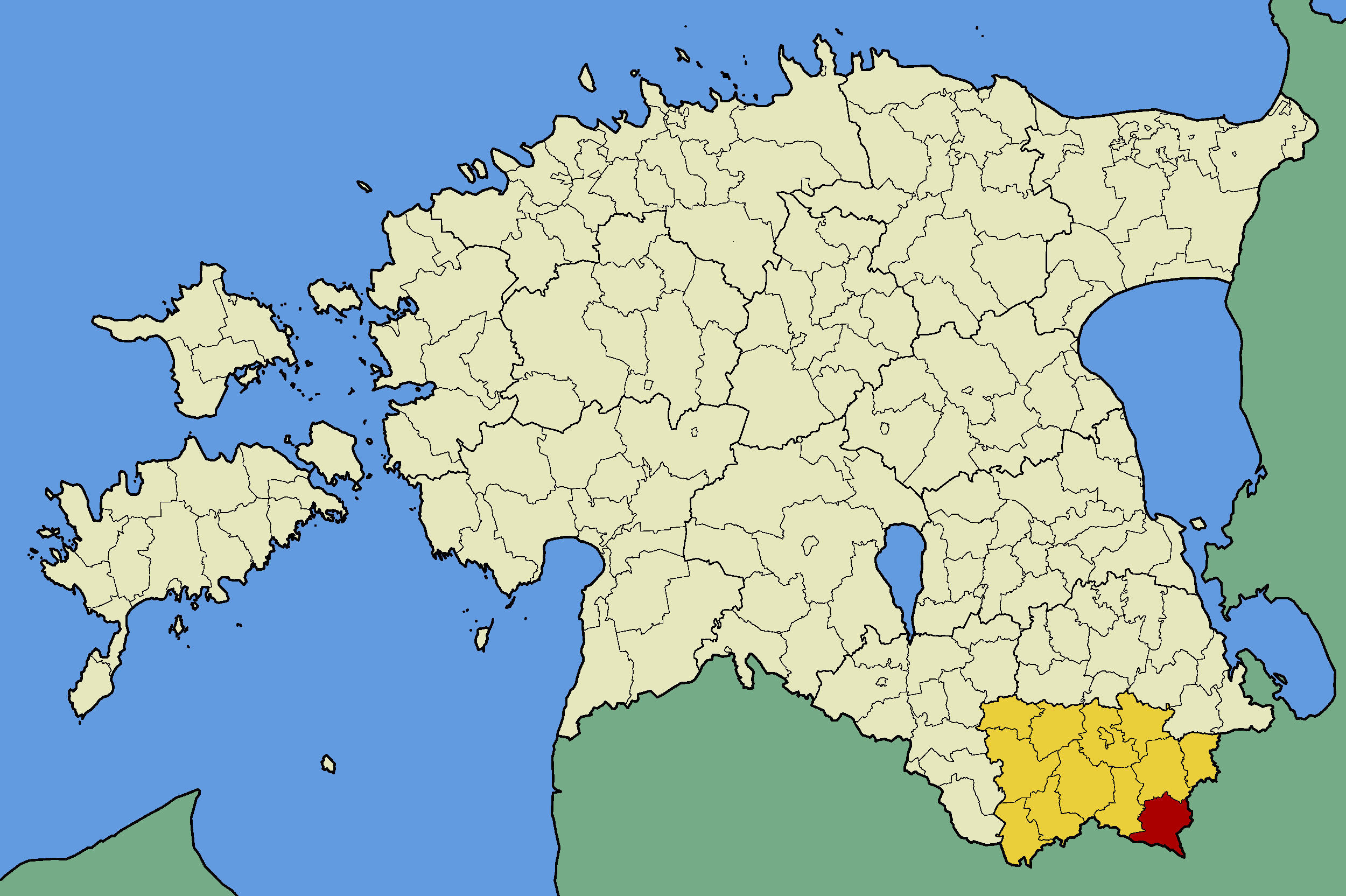
- Misso Parish within Võru County
- Country: Estonia
- County: Võru
- Established: 1991
- Merged into expanded Rõuge Parish: 21 October 2017
- Administrative centre: Misso

Area
  - Total: 189.35 km^{2} (73.11 sq mi)

Population (01.01.2009)
  - Total: 780
  - Density: 4.1/km^{2} (11/sq mi)
- Website: www.misso.ee

Misso Parish (Estonian: Misso vald; Võro: Miss'o vald) was a rural municipality of Estonia, in Võru County. It had a population of 780 (as of 1 January 2009) and an area of 189.35 km^{2}.

In 2017, it merged with Rõuge Parish, Haanja Parish, Mõniste Parish, and Varstu Parish to create a new entity. It retained the Rõuge Parish name.

== Settlements ==
Small borough

Misso

Villages

Häärmäni - Hindsa - Hino - Horosuu - Hürsi - Käbli - Kärinä - Kaubi - Kimalasõ - Kivioru - Koorla - Korgõssaarõ - Kossa - Kriiva - Kundsa - Kurõ - Laisi - Leimani - Lütä - Määsi - Mauri - Missokülä - Mokra - Möldre - Muraski - Napi - Pältre - Parmu - Pedejä - Põnni - Põrstõ - Pruntova - Pulli - Pupli - Rammuka - Rebäse - Ritsiko - Saagri - Saagrimäe - Saika - Sakudi - Sandi - Sapi - Savimäe - Savioja - Siksälä - Suurõsuu - Tiastõ - Tiilige - Tika - Toodsi - Tserebi - Tsiistre - Väiko-Tiilige
