= Estonian national road 7 =

Road in Estonia

National Road 7
- Põhimaantee 7

Route information
- Length: 22 km (14 mi)

Major junctions
- From: Murati border with Latvia
- Luhamaa
- To: Luhamaa border with Russia

Location
- Country: Estonia
- Counties: Võru County

Highway system
- Transport in Estonia
← T6	→ T8

Riia-Pihkva maantee (translates from Estonian as Riga-Pskov highway, alternatively Põhimaantee nr 7, unofficially abbreviated T7) is a highway in south-eastern Estonia. It is a short section of the E77 in Estonia, serving little other purpose, with just 21.4 kilometres of length. The highway begins on the Latvian border and ends at the Russian border crossing at Luhamaa.

Within Estonia, the road serves the borough of Misso. The AADT on the road is 650, with up to a third being heavy traffic.

The highway is single carriageway, with at-grade intersections.

== Overview ==
The T7 starts at the Latvian border, having bypassed the disused Veclaicene/Murati border crossing. After driving through the borough of Misso, it intersects with the T2/E267 and reaches Luhamaa border crossing with Russia.

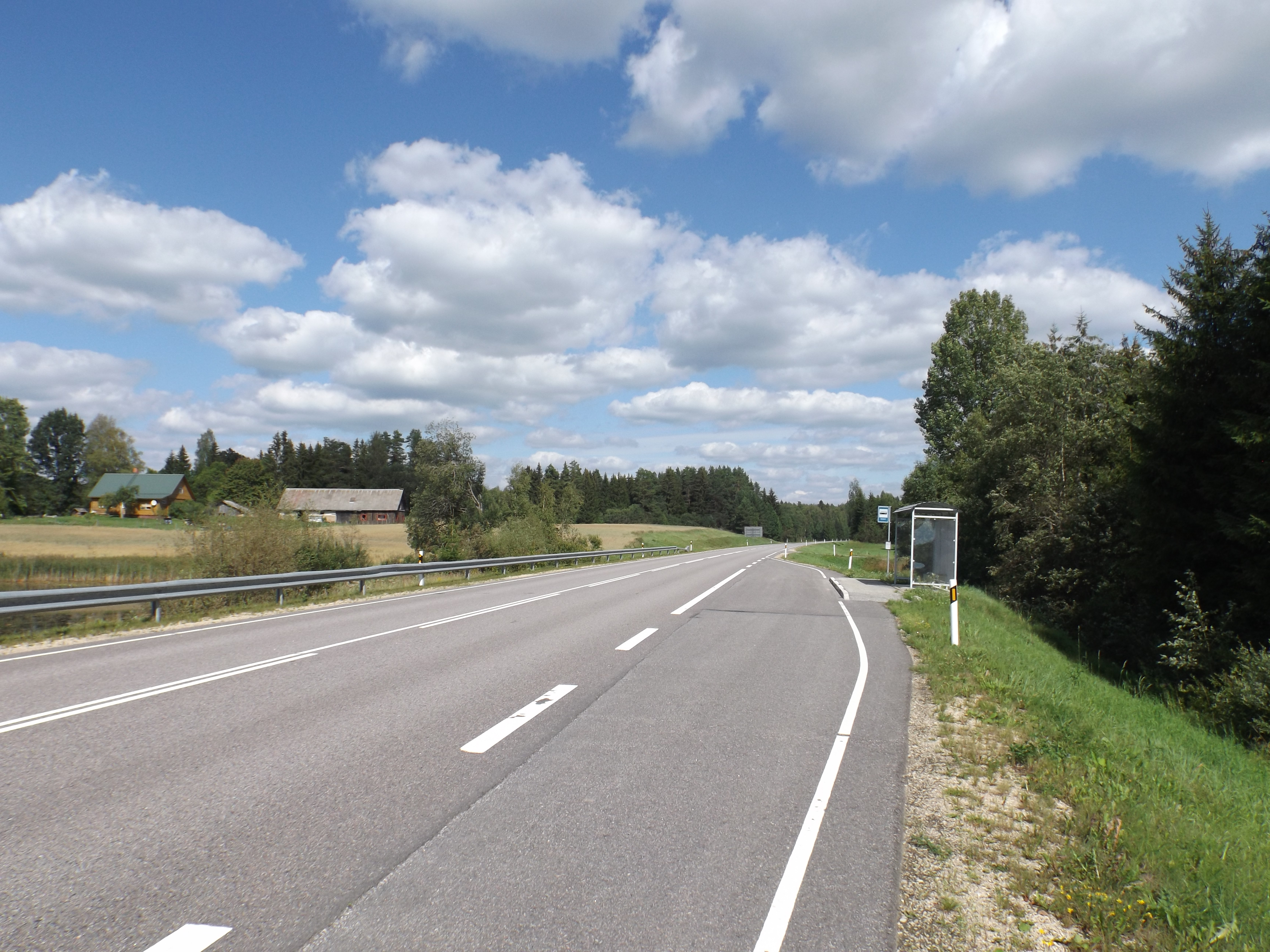
T7 in Murati

=== Road lane count ===
22 km
1+1 road

== Route table ==
The entire route is in Võru County.

Municipality	Location	km	mi	Destinations	Notes
Murati border crossing with Latvia Europe
Rõuge	Murati			– Hurda	
Rõuge	Murati			– Haanja, Ruusmäe	
Rõuge	Käbli			– Haanja	
Rõuge	Misso			– Rammuka, Tsiistre	
Rõuge	Missokülä			– Kiviora	
Setomaa	Tiilige			– Pältre	
Setomaa	Tiilige			– Savimäe	
Setomaa	Luhamaa			– Tallinn, Võru	
Setomaa	Määsi			– Kiviora	
Luhamaa border crossing with Russia
1.000 mi = 1.609 km; 1.000 km = 0.621 mi
