= Hino =

Hino may refer to:

== Places ==
=== Estonia ===
- Hino, Põlva County
- Hino, Võru County
  - Lake Hino

=== Japan ===
- Hino, Shiga
- Hino, Tokyo
- Hino, Tottori
  - Hino District, Tottori
  - Hino River

== Transportation ==
- Hino Motors, a Japanese truck manufacturer owned by Toyota
  - Hino Pakistan
- Hino Station (disambiguation), railway stations in Japan:
  - Hino Station (Nagano), a railway station Susuka, Nagano, operated by Nagano Electric Railway
  - Hino Station (Shiga), a railway station operated by Ohmi Railway
  - Hino Station (Tokyo), a railway station operated by East Japan Railway Company

== Other uses ==
- Hino (surname), a Japanese surname
- Hé-no, also called Hino, an Iroquois thunder spirit

== See also ==
- Heino (disambiguation)
