= Lake Hino =

Lake in Estonia

- Hino järv (Estonian)
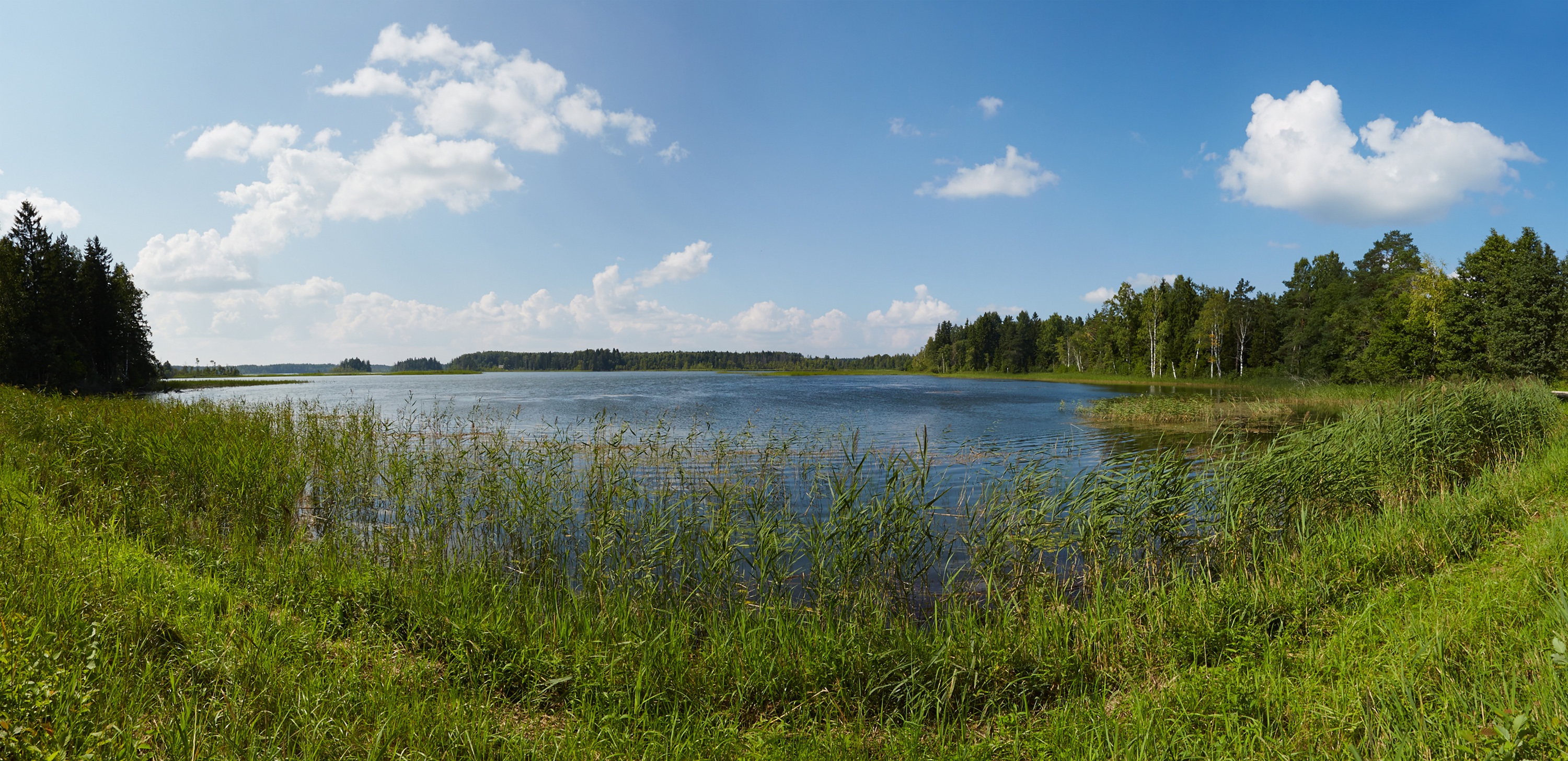

- Location within Estonia
- Location: Võru County, Estonia
- Coordinates: 57°34′45″N 27°13′0″E
- Basin countries: Estonia
- Surface area: 205.7 hectares (508 acres)
- Average depth: 2.4 meters (7 ft 10 in)
- Max. depth: 7.9 meters (26 ft)
- Surface elevation: 180.5 meters (592 ft)
- Islands: 7: Mar'asaar, Valgõsaar, Pikksaar, Pidusaar, Kõossaar (two islands), Tsõõriksaar

Lake Hino (Estonian: Hino järv, also: Pugula järv, Henno-Pugula järv, Henno järv, Pugola järv, or Suur-Pugola järv) is a lake in Rõuge Parish, Võru County, Estonia. It is located in the village of Laisi in Rõuge Parish, Võru County, and it border the villages of Hino, Siksälä, Kimalasõ, and Kaubi.

== Physical description ==
The lake has an area of 205.7 hectares (508 acres), and it has seven islands with a combined area of 4.9 hectares (12 acres). The lake has an average depth of 2.4 meters (7 ft 10 in) and a maximum depth of 7.9 meters (26 ft). It is 2,860 meters (9,380 ft) long, and its shoreline measures 11,970 meters (39,270 ft). It has a volume of 5,006,000 cubic meters (176,800,000 cu ft). It is the largest and most island-rich lake in the Haanja Upland.

== See also ==
- List of lakes of Estonia
