= Tikva =

Tikva (Hebrew: תִּקְוָה \ תקווה tikvá) or Tikvah is a Hebrew word meaning "hope" / "Hope". Despite being grammatically feminine and most commonly found among women, particularly in the Ethiopian Jewish community due to its similarity to the Ethio-Semitic term Tesfa, it is a male name in the Hebrew Bible or Tanakh.

Tikvah may also refer to:

== Organizations ==
- Tikvah Fund, American nonprofit charitable foundation
- Tikvah Chadasha, British-Jewish congregation
- Tikva Forum, a right-wing organization of Israeli hostage families

== Arts and entertainment ==
- Tikva Records, a Jewish American record label which existed from the 1940s to the 1970s

== People ==
- Tikva Frymer-Kensky (1943–2006), Professor at the University of Chicago Divinity School
- Avi Tikva (born 1976), retired Israeli professional association footballer
- Shalom Tikva (born 1965), former Israeli international footballer
- Tikvah Alper (1909–1995), South African radiobiologist

== Places ==
- Tikva Quarter or Hatikva Quarter, a poor and working-class neighbourhood in south-eastern Tel Aviv, Israel
- Ganei Tikva, a local council in Israel, bordering Kiryat Ono to the west, Petah Tikva to the north, Gat Rimon to the east and Savyon to the south
- Petah Tikva, known as Em HaMoshavot, a city in the Center District of Israel, east of Tel Aviv
- Sha'arei Tikva, an Israeli settlement and a communal village northeast of Rosh HaAyin

== See also ==
- Hatikvah
- TIVA (disambiguation)
- Tika (disambiguation)
