= Heino (disambiguation) =

Heino (born 1938) is a German schlager and volksmusik music singer.

Heino may also refer to:

- Heino (given name)
- Heino (surname)
- Heino, Netherlands, a village in the province of Overijssel
  - Heino railway station, a railway station in the village of Heino

== See also ==
- Hino (disambiguation)
