= Tesfaye =

Tesfaye (Amharic: ተስፋዬ, IPA: tɛsfäyɛ; transl: täsfajé), is a Habesha name meaning "my hope," "my trust," or "my expectation."

It is derived from Ethio-Semitic tesfa (hope) which also forms the beginning of compound names such as Tesfa Iyasus (hope in Jesus), Tesfaldet (hope in the birth), and Tesfamikael (hope in Michael) as well as male name Tesfai (also spelled Tesfay), a slightly different male name found mostly among the Tigray-Tigrinya as opposed to the more popular Amhara variant (due to the Amhara preference for conjugations also seen in tsegaye, tensaye, or tsehaye) and female name Tesfana. All forms add nouns, possessives, or definite articles to the core word.

In 2019, Tesfaye was recorded as the most common surname in Ethiopia. According to the 2010 United States Census, Tesfaye is the 19075^{th} most common surname in the United States, belonging to 1427 individuals. Tesfaye is most common among individuals identifying as Black (96.5%). Tesfa itself is related to Hebrew Tikva, a common Jewish name found in the Bible . It may refer to:

- Tesfaye Abera (born 1992), Ethiopian long-distance runner
- Tesfaye Alebachew (born 1988), Ethiopian footballer
- Tesfaye Bramble (born 1980), English footballer playing internationally for Montserrat
- Tesfaye Dinka (1939–2016), former Prime Minister of Ethiopia
- Tesfaye Eticha (born 1974), Ethiopian marathon runner competing for Switzerland
- Tesfaye Gebre Kidan (1935?–2004), Ethiopian army general and former President of Ethiopia
- Tesfaye Gessesse (born 1937), Ethiopian theatre actor and director
- Tesfaye Jifar (born 1976), Ethiopian former marathon runner
- Tesfaye Tafa (born 1962), Ethiopian former marathon runner
- Tesfaye Tafese (born 1986), Ethiopian footballer
- Tesfaye Tola (born 1974), Ethiopian former marathon runner
- Abel "The Weeknd" Tesfaye (born 1990), Canadian musician and producer
- Aseged Tesfaye (1970/1971–2017), Ethiopian former professional footballer
- Daniel Tesfaye (born 19??), former Ethiopian cyclist
- Mattias Tesfaye (born 1981), Danish politician
- Selam Tesfaye (born 1993), Ethiopian film actress
- Seyoum Tesfaye (born 1989), Ethiopian professional footballer
- Tesfaye Cooper (born 1998), American criminal and perpetrator of the 2017 Chicago torture incident hate crime
- Roman Tesfaye (born 1968), former First Lady of Ethiopia

== Tesfai ==
- Azie Tesfai, American actress
- Haftamnesh Tesfay (born 1994), Ethiopian long-distance runner
- Tesfai Gebreab, Eritrean diplomat and political prisoner
