= Heino (given name) =

Male given name

Heino is a masculine given name. Notable people with the name include:

- Heino (born 1938), German schlager and volksmusik music singer
- Heino Anto (1882–1955), Estonian playwright, actor, politician and journalist
- Frank Heino Damrosch (1859–1937), German-born American music conductor and educator
- Heino Dissing (1912–1990), Danish cyclist and Olympic competitor
- Heino Eller (1887–1970), Estonian composer and composition teacher
- Heino Enden (born 1959), Estonian professional basketball power forward
- Heino Ferch (born 1963), German film and television actor
- Heino Finkelmann (born 1945), German chemist and professor
- Heino Heinrich Graf von Flemming (1632–1706), German field marshal and Governor of Berlin
- Heino Hansen (born 1947), Danish football player and Olympic competitor
- Heino von Heimburg (1889–1945), German Vice Admiral of the Kriegsmarine and U-boat commander during WWI
- Heino Heinaste (1928–2006), Estonian track and field athlete
- Heino Holm (born 1979), Danish handballer
- Heino Jürisalu (1930–1991), Estonian composer
- Heino Kaski (1885–1957), Finnish composer and pianist
- Heino Kiik (1927–2013), Estonian writer and journalist
- Heino Kostabi (1933–2021), Estonian politician
- Heino Kuhn (born 1984), South African cricketer
- Heino Kruus (1926–2012), Estonian basketball player and Olympic competitor
- Heino Kurvet (1941–2020), Estonian sprint canoeist and Olympic medalist
- Heino Lill (born 1944), Estonian basketball coach and basketball player
- Heino Liiv (1930–2021), Estonian linguist and philologist
- Heino Lipp (1922–2006), Estonian decathlete
- Heino Lind (1931–2008), Estonian sport sailor
- Heino Mandri (1922–1990), Estonian actor
- Heino Meyer-Bahlburg (born 1940), German-born American psychologist
- Heino Pars (1925–2014), Estonian animated film director
- Heino Pulli (1938–2015), Finnish ice hockey player
- Heino Puuste (born 1955), Estonian javelin thrower and Olympic competitor
- Heino von Rantzau (1894–1946), German Generalleutnant in the Luftwaffe during World War II
- Heino Schmieden (1835–1913), German architect
- Heino Seljamaa (born 1952), Estonian actor
- Heino Senekal (born 1975), Namibian rugby player
- Heino Sepp (1936–2008), Estonian rally driver
- Heino Sild (1944–2009), Estonian shot putter
- Heino Sisask (1928–2023), Estonian politician, racewalker and sports personality
- Heino Thielemann (1923–2015), German field hockey player and Olympic competitor
- Heino Torga (1933–2012), Estonian theatre director and actor
