= Rebase =

Rebase may refer to:

- Rebasing, a computer process
- Rebase, Estonia, a village in Kambja Parish, Tartu County, Estonia
- Rebäse, a village in Rõuge Parish, Võru County, Estonia
