= Sandi, Estonia =

Village in Estonia

Sandi
- Village
- Location in Estonia
- Coordinates: 57°39′54″N 27°13′29″E
- Country: Estonia
- County: Võru County
- Municipality: Rõuge Parish

Population (2011 Census)
  - Total: 3

Sandi is a village in Rõuge Parish, Võru County in southeastern Estonia. Between 1991–2017 (until the administrative reform of Estonian municipalities) the village was located in Misso Parish. It is located about 7 km north of Misso, the administrative centre of the municipality and about 8 km southwest of Vastseliina. As of the 2011 census, the village's population was 3.

There are 5 farmsteads in the village: Kopli, Mäe, Siusaare, Saare and Sandi.
