= Möldre =

Möldre may refer to several places in Estonia:

- Möldre, Valga County, village in Estonia
- Möldre, Võru County, village in Estonia
- Möldre wall, sandstone outcrop in Estonia

People with first or last name:

- Mari Möldre, cello player and actress
- Kenneth-Hans Möldre, Estonian basketball player
- Sten Möldre, Estonian basketball player
