= Tsega =

Tsega is an Ethiopian given name. Notable people with the name include:

- Tsega Melaku (born 1968), Israeli author, journalist, and community activist
- Tsega Gebre Beyene (born 1994), Ethiopian racing cyclist

== See also ==
- Tsegay
