= Häärmäni =

Village in Võru County, Estonia

Coordinates: 57°40′13″N 27°17′03″E

- Village
- Interactive map of Häärmäni
- Country: Estonia
- County: Võru County
- Parish: Rõuge Parish
- Time zone: UTC+2 (EET)
  - Summer (DST): UTC+3 (EEST)

Häärmäni is a village in Rõuge Parish, Võru County in southeastern Estonia. The population has been 0 since 2021.

Before the Estonian local government administrative reform in 2017, the village belonged to the Misso borough.

In 2017, the village of Rebäse was merged with Häärmäni.
