= Lake Pulli =

Lake in Estonia

- Pulli järv (Estonian)
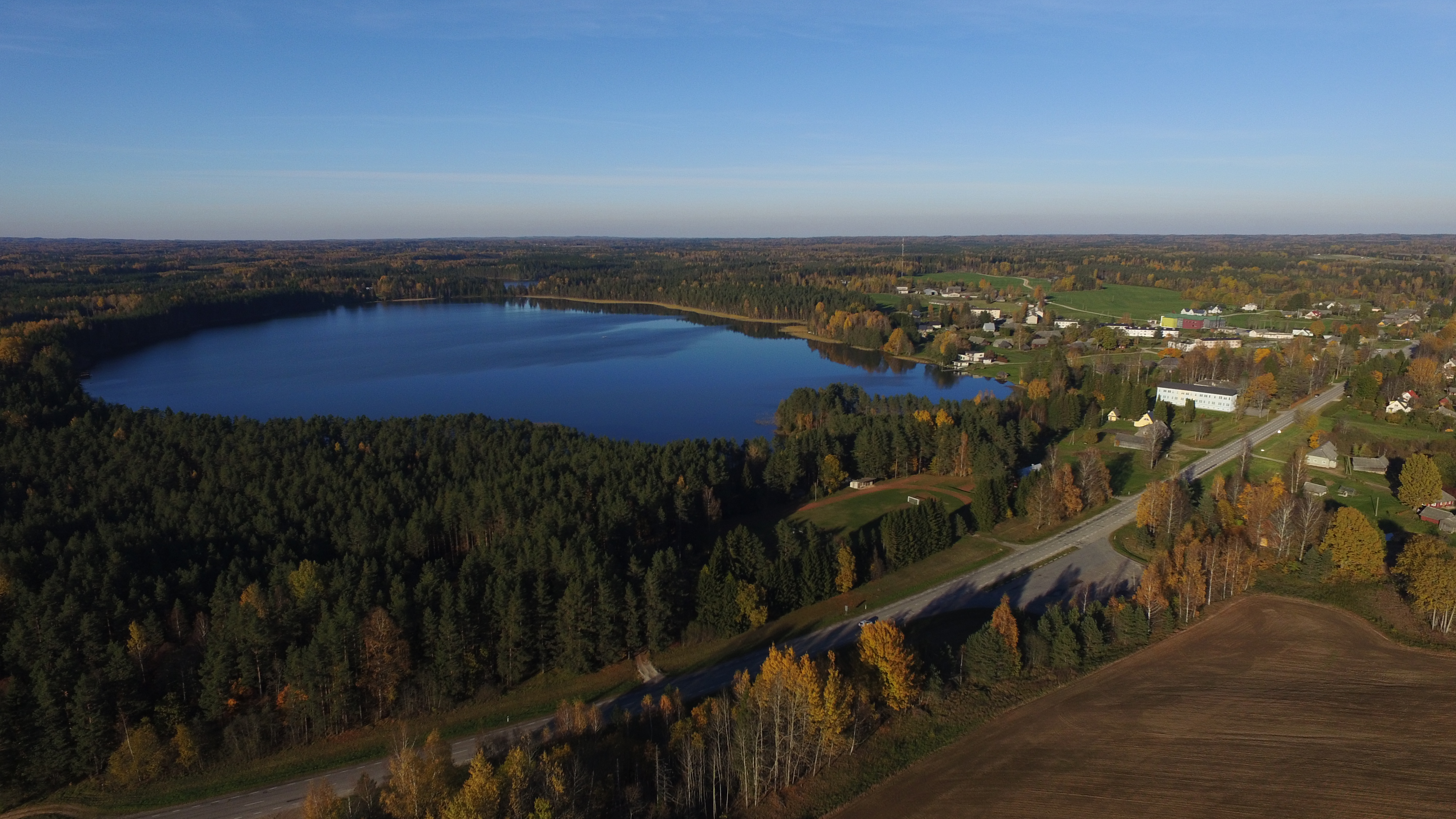
- Lake Pulli and the settlement of Misso

- Location within Estonia
- Location: Misso, Rõuge Parish, Võru County
- Coordinates: 57°36′20″N 27°12′50″E
- Basin countries: Estonia
- Max. length: 1,180 meters (3,870 ft)
- Surface area: 63.1 hectares (156 acres)
- Average depth: 2.5 meters (8 ft 2 in)
- Max. depth: 5.2 meters (17 ft)
- Water volume: 1,619,000 cubic meters (57,200,000 cu ft)
- Shore length^{1}: 3,210 meters (10,530 ft)
- Surface elevation: 183.7 meters (603 ft)
- ^{1} Shore length is not a well-defined measure.

Lake Pulli (Estonian: Pulli järv, also known as Pullijärv) is a lake in southeastern Estonia. It is located in the village of Põdramõtsa in Rõuge Parish, Võru County.

== Physical description ==
The lake has an area of 63.1 hectares (156 acres). The lake has an average depth of 2.5 meters (8 ft 2 in) and a maximum depth of 5.2 meters (17 ft). It is 1,180 meters (3,870 ft) long, and its shoreline measures 3,210 meters (10,530 ft). It has a volume of 1,619,000 cubic meters (57,200,000 cu ft).

== Gallery ==
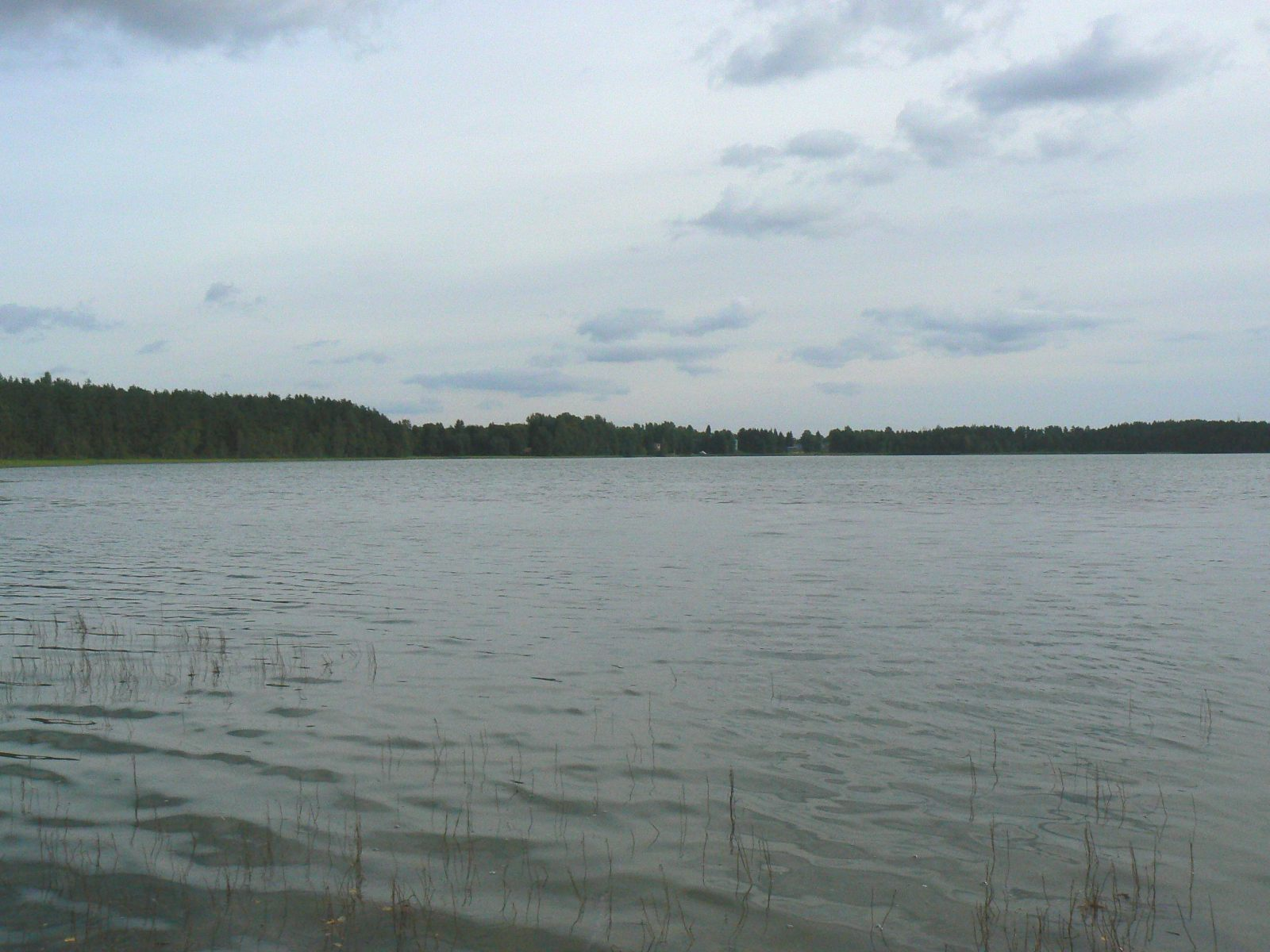
Water lobelia (Lobelia dortmanna) in Lake Pulli
