= Hino Landscape Conservation Area =

Protected area in Estonia

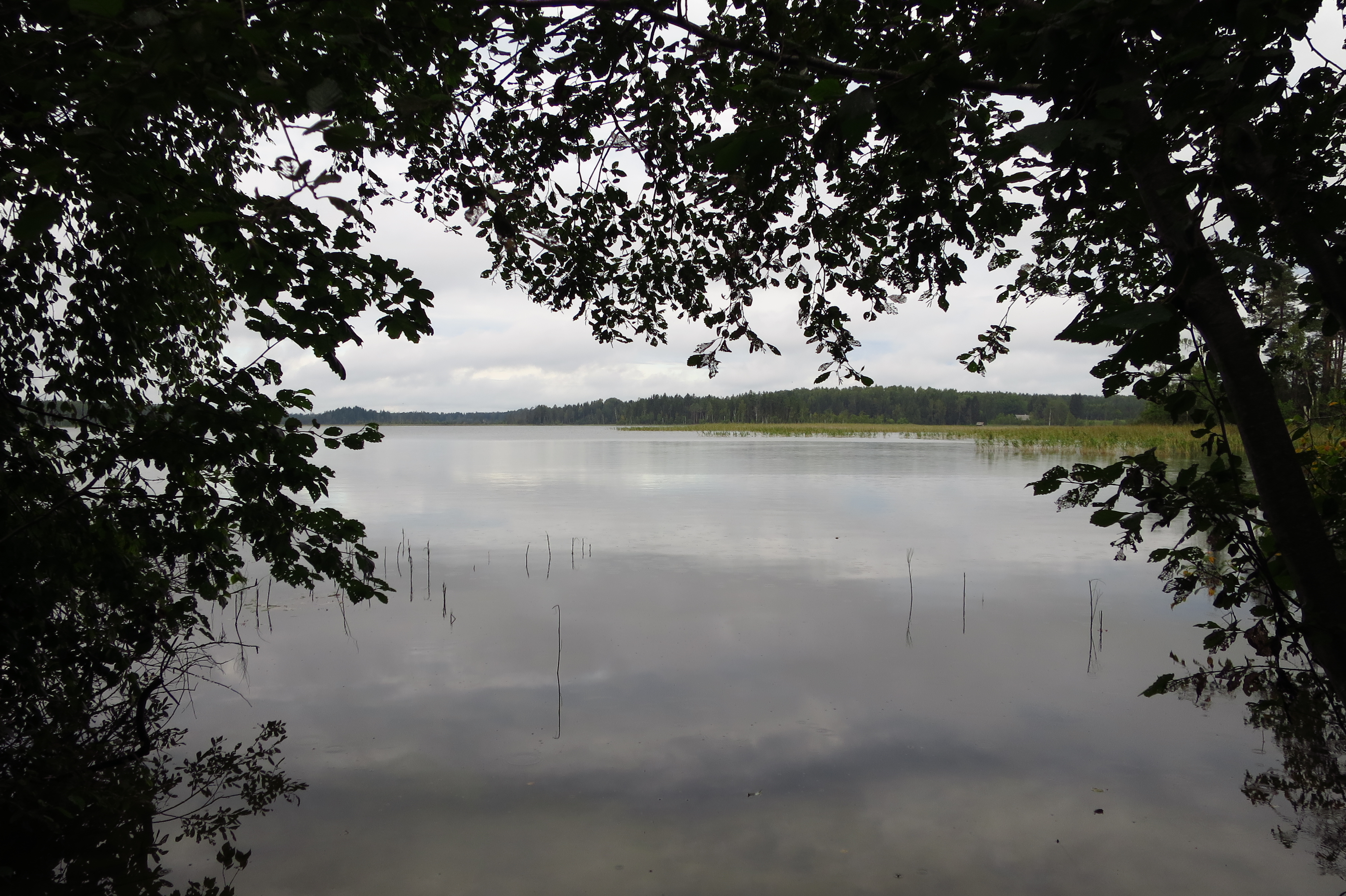

- Location within Estonia
- Location: Estonia
- Coordinates: 57°35′N 27°11′E
- Area: 701 ha (1,730 acres)
- Established: 1962 (2005)

Hino Landscape Conservation Area is a nature park situated in Võru County, Estonia.

Its area is 701 ha.

The protected area was designated in 1962 to protect Hino Lake and its bird colonies. In 2005, the protected area was redesigned to the landscape conservation area.
