= Kaubi =

Kaubi may refer to several places in Estonia:

- Kaubi, Saare County, village in Estonia
- Kaubi, Valga County, village in Estonia
- Kaubi, Võru County, village in Estonia
