= TIVA =

TIVA may refer to:

== People ==
- Tiva Ben-Yehuda or Netiva Ben-Yehuda (1928–2011), Israeli author, editor and media personality
- Tiva, the portmanteau for characters Tony DiNozzo and Ziva David

== Science and technology ==
- TIVA, medical acronym for total intravenous anesthesia; see Remifentanil
- Tiva species, see Thubana
- Transcriptome in vivo analysis tag (TIVA tag), a molecular biology mRNA isolation technique

== Other uses ==
- Tiva TV, branding name for WRUA in Fajardo, Puerto Rico

== See also ==
- Tivaru
- Tivat
