= Eritrea, Eritrea, Eritrea =

National anthem of Eritrea

Ertra, Ertra, Ertra (Tigrinya Romanization)
English: Eritrea, Eritrea, Eritrea
- ኤርትራ ኤርትራ ኤርትራ
- National anthem of Eritrea
- Lyrics: Solomon Tsehaye Beraki, 1986, 1993
- Music: Isaac Abraham Meharezghi and Aron Tekle Tesfatsion, 1985–1986
- Adopted: 1993

Audio sample
- U.S. Navy Band instrumental version: file; help

"Eritrea, Eritrea, Eritrea" (Tigrinya: ኤርትራ ኤርትራ ኤርትራ, romanized: Ertra, Ertra, Ertra) is the national anthem of Eritrea. Adopted in 1993 shortly after independence, it was written by Solomon Tsehaye Beraki and composed by Isaac Abraham Meharezghi and Aron Tekle Tesfatsion.

== History ==
The lyrics of the anthem were written by poet Solomon Tsehaye Beraki. Originally written in 1986, Solomon updated them in 1993 after Eritrea's independence. The music was composed in 1985–1986 by organist Isaac Abraham Meharezghi (also spelt Isaq), who was a member of the Eritrean People's Liberation Front cultural troupe.

== Lyrics ==
=== Current lyrics (1993–present) ===
Tigrinya lyrics

𝄆 ኤርትራ ኤርትራ ኤርትራ፡
በዓል ደማ እናልቀሰ ተደምሲሱ፡
መስዋእታ ብሓርነት ተደቢሱ። 𝄇

መዋእል ነኺሳ ኣብ ዕላማ፡
ትእምርቲ ጽንዓት ኰይኑ ስማ፡
ኤርትራ'ዛ ሓበን ውጹዓት፡
ኣመስኪራ ሓቂ ክምትዕወት።

ኤርትራ ኤርትራ፡
ኣብ ዓለም ጨቢጣቶ ግቡእ ክብራ።

ናጽነት ዘምጽኣ ልዑል ኒሕ፡
ንህንጻ ንልምዓት ክሰርሕ፡
ስልጣነ ከነልብሳ ግርማ፡
ሕድሪ'ለና ግምጃ ክንስልማ።

𝄆 ኤርትራ ኤርትራ፡
ኣብ ዓለም ጨቢጣቶ ግቡእ ክብራ። 𝄇

Transliteration

𝄆 Ertra, Ertra, Ertra,
Bä‘al däma Ənalqäsä tädämsisu,
Mäswaʼəta bəħarnät tädäbisu. 𝄇

Mäwaʼəl näxisa ab ‘əlama,
Təʼəmərti tsən‘at kwäynu səma,
Ertra-za ħabän wətsu‘at,
Amäskira ħaqi kəmtə‘əwät.

Ertra, Ertra,
Ab ‘Aläm chʼäbitʼato gəbuʼə kəbra!

Natsənät zämtsəʼa lə‘ul niħ,
Nəhnətsa nəlmə‘at kəsärəħ,
Səltʼanä känälbəsa gərma,
Ħədri-läna gəmja kənsəlma.

𝄆 Ertra, Ertra,
Ab ‘Aläm chʼäbitʼato gəbuʼə kəbra! 𝄇

IPA transcription (Note: See Help:IPA/Tigrinya and Tigrinya § Phonology.)

𝄆 [ʔer(ɨ).tra ʔer(ɨ).tra ʔer(ɨ).tra]
[bɐ.ʕal dɐ.ma nal.kʼɐ.sɐ tɐ.dɐm.si.su]
[mɐs.wa(ʔ).ta bɨ.ħar(ɨ).nɐt tɐ.dɐ.bi.su ǁ] 𝄇

[mɐ.wa.ʔɨl nɐ.xi.s‿ab ʕɨ.la.ma]
[tɨ(.ʔ)ɨ.mɨr.ti t͡sʼɨn.ʕat kʷɐj.nu sɨ.ma]
[ʔer(ɨ).tra.za ħa.bɐn wɨ.t͡sʼu.ʕat]
[ʔa.mɐs.ki.ra ħa.kʼi kɨm.tɨ.ʕɨ.wɐt ǁ]

[ʔer(ɨ).tra ʔer(ɨ).tra]
[ʔab ʕa.lɐm t͡ʃʼɐ.bi.tʼa.to gɨ.bu(ʔ)ɨ kɨb.ra ǁ]

[na.t͡sʼɨ.nɐt zɐm.t͡sʼɨ.ʔa lɨ.ʕul niħ]
[nɨ.hɨn.t͡sʼa nɨl.mɨ.ʕat kɨ.sɐ.rɨħ]
[sɨl.tʼa.nɐ kɐ.nɐl.bɨ.sa gɨr.ma]
[ħɨd.ri.lɐ.na gɨm.d͡ʒa kɨn.sɨl(ɨ).ma]

𝄆 [ʔer(ɨ).tra ʔer(ɨ).tra]
[ʔab ʕa.lɐm t͡ʃʼɐ.bi.tʼa.to gɨ.bu(ʔ)ɨ kɨb.ra ǁ] 𝄇

English translation

𝄆 Eritrea, Eritrea, Eritrea,
Her Nemesis destroyed while wailing,
her sacrifices vindicated by freedom. 𝄇

Forever firm in her principles,
her name became a synonym of tenacity,
Eritrea, the pride of the oppressed,
is a testament that truth prevails.

Eritrea, Eritrea,
has taken her rightful place in the world.

[So that] The supreme dedication that brought us freedom,
will serve to rebuild her and develop her,
We shall honor her with progress,
It is our legacy to crown her.

𝄆 Eritrea, Eritrea,
has taken her rightful place in the world. 𝄇

Arabic lyrics

𝄇 إرتريا إرتريا إرتريا
قد دحرت بغيظهم أعداءها
وتوجت بالنصر تضحياتها 𝄆

مع الأعداء قد مرت من عهود (Note: على الأهداف عضت من عهود is also sung.)
غدا اسمها معجزة الصمود
فخر المكافحين في إرتريا (Note: في is sometimes omitted.)
قد برهنت أن العلا لها

إرتريا إرتريا
تبوأت مكانها بين الأمم

بإصرارنا الذي جنى التحرير
سننجز البناء والتعمير
لتزدهر وتلبس الوقار
تعاهدنا أن تسمو إرتريا

𝄇 إرتريا إرتريا
تبوات مكانها بين الأمم 𝄆

Transliteration

𝄆 ʾIritriyā, ʾIritriyā, ʾIritriyā,
Qad dāḥarat biḡayyẓihim ʾaʿdāʾihā,
Wa-tuwwajat bi-l-naṣri taḍaḥīyātiha. 𝄇

Maʿa-l-ʾaʿdāʾ qad mrit min ʿuhūd,
Ḡadā ismuhā muʿjizata-ṣ-umūd,
Faḵr al-mukāfiḥīn fī ʾIritriyā,
Qad barhanat ʾan al-ʿulan lahā.

ʾIritriyā, ʾIritriyā,
Taduwwaʾāt makānahā bayni-l-ʾumam.

Bi-ʾṣarārini-la-ḏī jani-l-taḥrīr
Sananjaz ul-bināʾa wa-l-taʿmīr
Li-tazdahir wa-talbasa-l-waqār
Taʿāhadnā ʾan tasmū ʾIritriyā

𝄆 ʾIritriyā, ʾIritriyā,
Taduwwaʾāt makānahā bayni-l-ʾumam. 𝄇

=== Original lyrics (1986–1993) ===
Tigrinya lyrics

𝄆 ኤርትራ ኤርትራ ኤርትራ
በዓል ደማ እናልቀሰ ንኽለቃ
ህይወትና ነሕልፈላ ኣለና ደቃ 𝄇

መጋየጺ ጓና ከይትኸውን
መጻኢ ዕድላ ከይመክን
ናይ ዘበናት ናይ ህዝባ ዊንታ
ጽባሕ ክረዊ ኣብ ሓርነታ

ኤርትራ ኤርትራ
ኣብ ዓለም ክዋሃባ ግቡእ ክብራ (ኩሉ ብመጻኢ እዩ ተጻሒፉ)

ኣሜን ኣይበልናን ኣይሰገድናን
በዲህና ንያት ኣየዕረብናን
ክትብልጽግ ከነልብሳ ግርማ
ሕድሪ ኣለና ግምጃ ክንስልማ

𝄆 ኤርትራ ኤርትራ
ኣብ ዓለም ክዋሃባ ግቡእ ክብራ። 𝄇

Transliteration

𝄆 Ertra, Ertra, Ertra,
Bə‘al däma Ǝnalqäsä nəxəläqa,
Həywätna näħəlfäla ʼaläna däqa. 𝄇

Mägayätsi gwana käytəxäwən
Mätsaʼi ʼədəla käymäkən
Nay zäbänat nay həzba winta
Tsəbaħə kəräwi ʼab ħarənäta

Ertra, Ertra,
Ab ‘Aläm kəwahaba gəbuʼə kəbra! (ku bəmätsaʼi ʼəyu tätsaħifu)

ʼAmen ʼaybälnan ʼaysägädnan
Bädihna nəyat ʼayä‘əräbnan
Kətbəltsəg känälbəsa gərma,
Ħədri-ʼaläna gəmja kənsəlma.

𝄆 Ertra, Ertra,
Ab ‘Aläm kəwahaba gəbuʼə kəbra! 𝄇

IPA transcription

𝄆 [ʔer(ɨ).tra ʔer(ɨ).tra ʔer(ɨ).tra]
[bɐ.ʕal dɐ.ma nal.kʼɐ.sɐ nɨ.xɨ.lɐ.kʼa]
[hɨj.wɐt.na nɐ.ħɨl.fɐ.la‿a.lɐ.na dɐ.kʼa] 𝄇

[mɐ.ga.jɐt͡sʼ(i) gʷa.na kɐj.tɨ.xɐ.wɨn]
[mɐ.t͡sʼa.ʔi ʔɨ.dɨ.la kɐj.mɐ.kɨn]
[naj zɐ.bɐ.nat naj hɨz.ba win.ta]
[t͡sʼɨ.ba.ħɨ k(ɨ)rɐ.wi ʔab ħ(a)rɨ.nɐ.ta]

[ʔer(ɨ).tra ʔer(ɨ).tra]
[ʔab ʕa.lɐm kɨ.wa.ha.ba gɨ.bu.ʔɨ kɨb.ra] [ku bɨ.mɐ.t͡sʼa.ʔi ʔɨ.ju tɐ.t͡sʼa.ħi.fu]

[ʔa.men ʔaj.bɐl.nan ʔaj.sɐ.gɐd.nan]
[bɐ.dih.na nɨ.jat ʔa.jɐʕɨ.rɐb.nan]
[kɨt.bɨl.t͡sʼɨg kɐ.nɐl.bɨ.sa gɨr.ma]
[ħɨd.ria̯.lɐ.na gɨm.d͡ʒa kɨn.sɨl(ɨ).ma]

𝄆 [ʔer(ɨ).tra ʔer(ɨ).tra]
[ʔab ʕa.lɐm kɨ.wa.ha.ba gɨ.bu.ʔɨ kɨb.ra ǁ] 𝄇

English translation

𝄆 Eritrea, Eritrea, Eritrea,
A festival of her shed blood,
We devote our lives to her, her children. 𝄇

To avoid becoming a foreign exploit
The future of her destiny will not wither.
The people's will of centuries
Tomorrow tastes its liberty.

Eritrea, Eritrea,
In the world, her due glory will be given to her (all written in the future)

Amen, we did not bow down
Thus we did not bring her to an end.
For her majestic splendour to prosper,
We are now entrusted to decorate the treasure.

𝄆 Eritrea, Eritrea,
In the world, her due glory will be given to her. 𝄇
