= Ritsiko =

Village in Estonia

- Location within Estonia
- Coordinates: 57°35′0″N 27°18′0″E
- Country: Estonia
- County: Võru County
- Time zone: UTC+2 (EET)

Ritsiko is a settlement in Misso Parish, Võru County in southeastern Estonia.
