= Toyoda Station =

Railway station in Hino, Tokyo, Japan

JC21 Toyoda Station 豊田駅
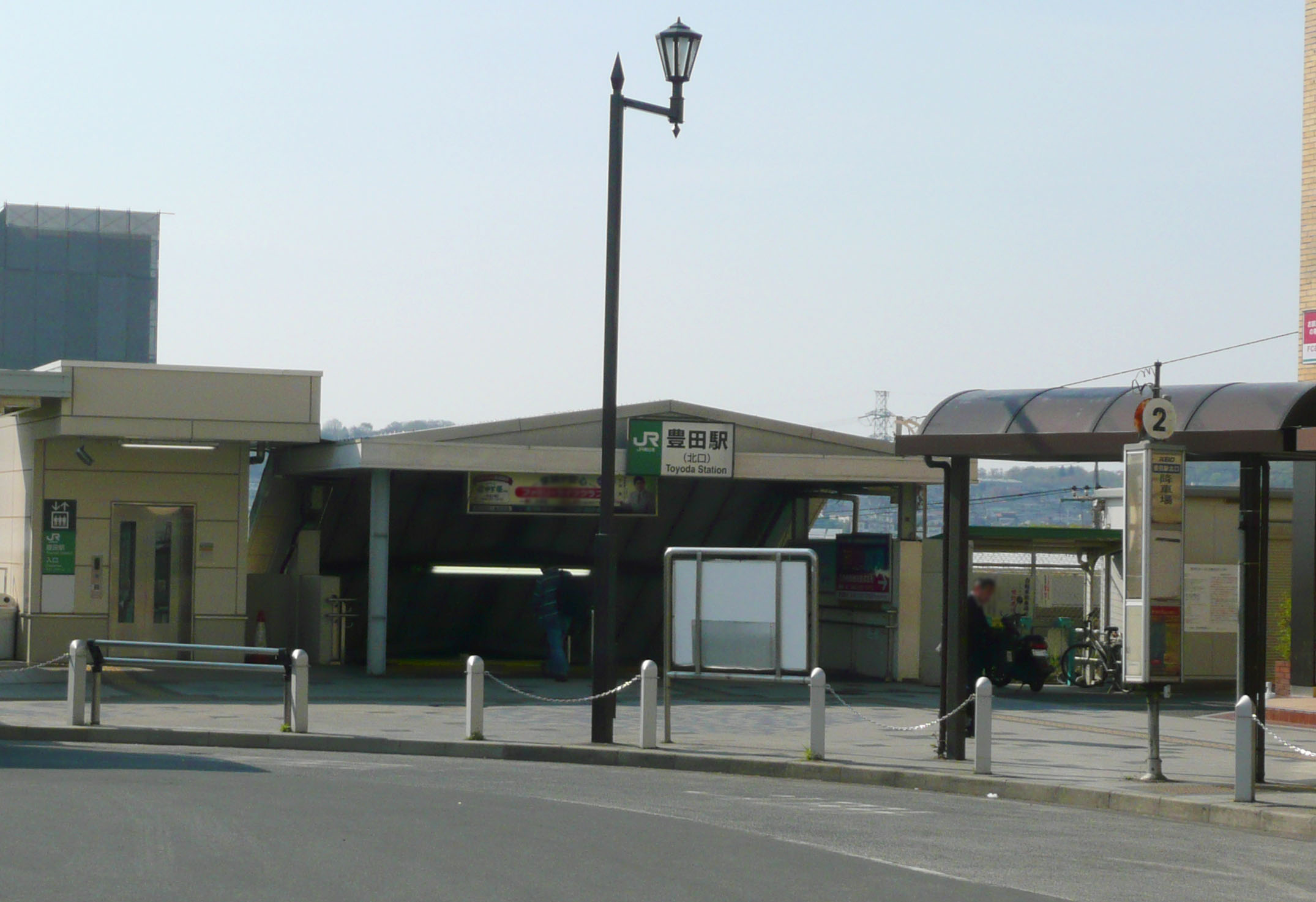
- Toyoda Station, April 2014

General information
- Location: 4-41-41 Toyoda, Hino-shi, Tokyo 191-0053; Japan
- Coordinates: 35.6598°N 139.3814°E
- Operator: JR East
- Lines: Chūō Main Line; Chūō Rapid Line
- Distance: 32.8 km from Shinjuku
- Platforms: 2 island platforms

Other information
- Status: Staffed
- Website: Official website

History
- Opened: 1 November 1927

Passengers
- FY2024: 64,440 (daily) ▲3.18%

Services
Preceding station	JR East	Following station
Hachiōji JC22 towards Shiojiri	Chūō Main Line Local	Hino JC20 towards Tachikawa
Hachiōji JC22 towards Ōtsuki	Chūō Line Chūō Special Rapid	Hino JC20 towards Tokyo
Hachiōji JC22 towards Ōtsuki	Chūō Line Commuter Rapid	Hino One-way operation
Hachiōji JC22 towards Ōtsuki	Chūō Line Rapid	Hino JC20 towards Tokyo
Hachiōji JC22 Terminus	Musashino	Hino JC20 towards Ōmiya
Location
- Location within Tokyo Location within Japan

Toyoda Station (豊田駅, Toyoda-eki) is a passenger railway station located in the city of Hino, Tokyo, Japan, operated by East Japan Railway Company (JR East).

== Lines ==
Toyoda Station is served by the Chūō Main Line with also Chūō Line (Rapid) limited stop services from Tokyo. The station is 43.1 kilometers from Tokyo Station.

== Station layout ==
The station consists of two island platforms serving four tracks with the platforms connected by a footbridge. The station is staffed.

=== Platforms ===
1/2	Chūō Main Line	for Hachiōji, Takao, Ōtsuki, Kōfu
3/4	Chūō Main Line	for Tachikawa, Mitaka, Shinjuku, Tokyo

== History ==
Toyoda Station opened on 22 February 1901. With the privatization of Japanese National Railways (JNR) on 1 April 1987, the station came under the control of JR East.

== Passenger statistics ==
In fiscal 2019, the station was used by an average of 35,718 passengers daily (boarding passengers only).

The passenger figures for previous years are as shown below.

Fiscal year	Daily average
2005	32,747
2010	30,580
2015	33,254

== See also ==
- List of railway stations in Japan
