= Tsehaye =

Tsehaye is a surname. Notable people with the surname include:

- Abay Tsehaye (1953–2021), Ethiopian politician
- Seyoum Tsehaye (born 1952), Eritrean journalist
- Solomon Tsehaye (born 1956), Eritrean poet
- Vanessa Tsehaye, Swedish–Eritrean human rights activist
