= Hino Station =

Hino Station (日野駅) is the name of three train stations in Japan:

- Hino Station (Nagano)
- Hino Station (Shiga)
- Hino Station (Tokyo)
- Bushū-Hino Station
