= Tika =

Tika or TIKA may refer to:

- Tika (crater), a crater on Saturn's satellite Rhea
- Tika, Estonia, village in Võru County
- Apache Tika, content analysis software
- Tika (dog) (2010/2011–2025), Italian Greyhound
- Tika Waylan, a character in the DragonLance series of fantasy novels
- Tika and The Dissidents, an Indonesian band
- Bhai Tika, a Hindu festival
- "Tika Tika Tok", a 1955 song by Alma Cogan
- Tika Zone, part of the Rhino Camp Refugee Settlement, Uganda
- Tilaka, a mark worn usually on the forehead in Hinduism
- Turkish Cooperation and Coordination Agency, an international development government agency
- Sub-commentaries (Theravāda), in Theravada Buddhism
- Crown Prince, a title in certain Indian monarchies
- Peter (name), where "Tika" is an Albanian variation of a nickname for Petrika
- Tika giacchinoi an extinct genus of rhynchocephalian reptile from the Late Cretaceous of South America.
- Steek (Sikh literature), an alternative term

== People with the name Tika ==
- Tika (singer) (born 1980), Indonesian singer
- Tika Bhandari (born 1964), Nepalese musician
- Tika Bogati (born 1962), Nepalese long-distance runner
- Tika Bravani (born 1990), Indonesian actress
- Tika Patsatsia (born 1981), Georgian entertainer
- Tika Ram Paliwal (1909–1995), Indian politician
- Tika Shrestha (born 1964), Nepalese sport shooter
- Tika Simone (a/k/a TiKA), Canadian rhythm and blues singer
- Tika Sumpter (born 1980), American entertainer
- Tika, character from The Wacky Adventures of Ronald McDonald

== See also ==
- Tikka (disambiguation)
