= Transcriptome in vivo analysis tag =

Molecule for mRNA-capture

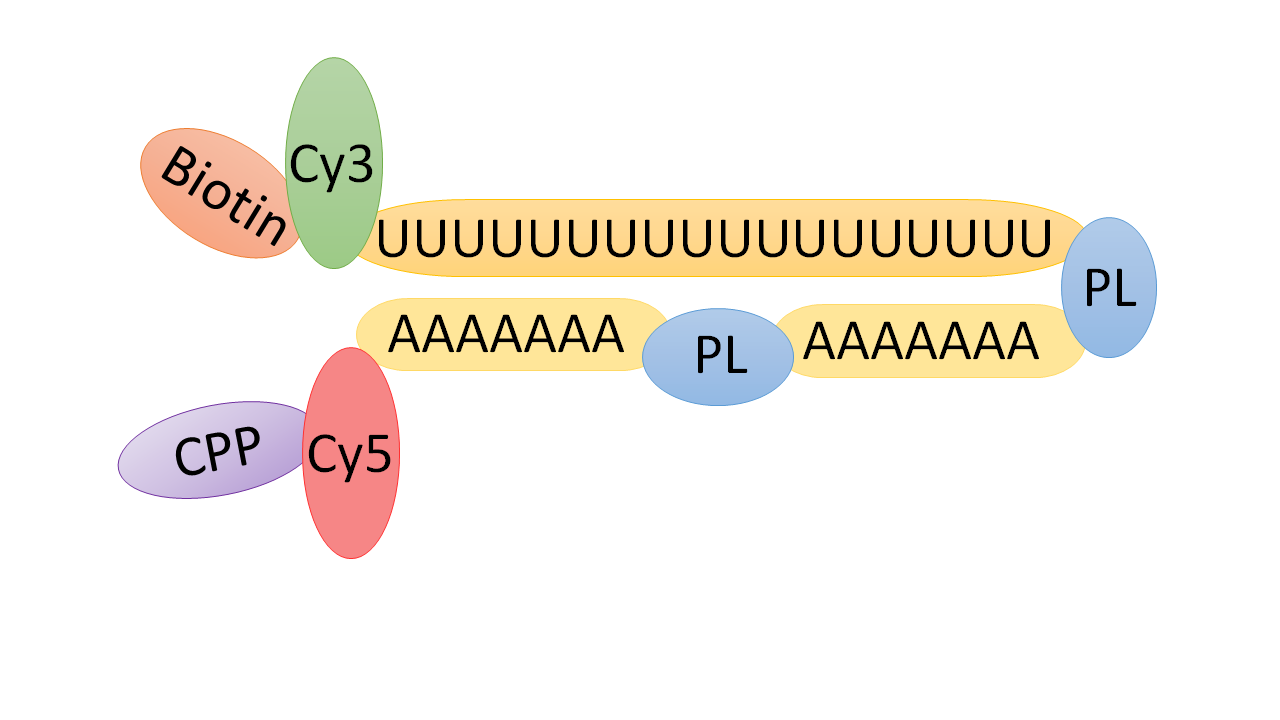
Chemical components cartoon of a TIVA tag before photoactivation. "PL" refers to a photocleavable linker and "CPP" refers to a cell-penetrating peptide

A transcriptome in vivo analysis tag (TIVA tag) is a multifunctional, photoactivatable mRNA-capture molecule designed for isolating mRNA from a single cell in complex tissues.

== Background ==
A transcript is an RNA molecule that is copied or transcribed from a DNA template. A transcript can be further processed by alternative splicing, which is the retention of different combinations of exons. These unique combinations of exons are termed RNA transcript isoforms. The transcriptome is a set of all RNA, including rRNA, mRNA, tRNA, and non-coding RNA. Specifically mRNA transcripts can be used to investigate differences in gene expression patterns. Transcriptome profiling is determining the composition of transcripts and their relative expression levels in a given reference set of cells. This analysis involves characterization of all functional genomic elements, coding and non-coding.

The current RNA capture methods involve sorting cells in suspension from acutely dissociated tissue, and thus can lose information about cell morphology and microenvironment. Transcript abundance and isoforms are significantly different across tissues and are continually changing throughout an individual’s life. Gene expression is highly tissue specific, therefore with traditional RNA capture methods one must be cautious in the interpretation of gene expression patterns, as they often reflect expression of a heterogeneous mix of cell populations. Even in the same cell type, tissue measurements, where a population of cells is obtained, mask both low-level mRNA expression in single cells and variation in expression between cells. The photoactivatable TIVA tag is engineered to capture the mRNA of a single cell in complex tissues.

== Chemical structure ==
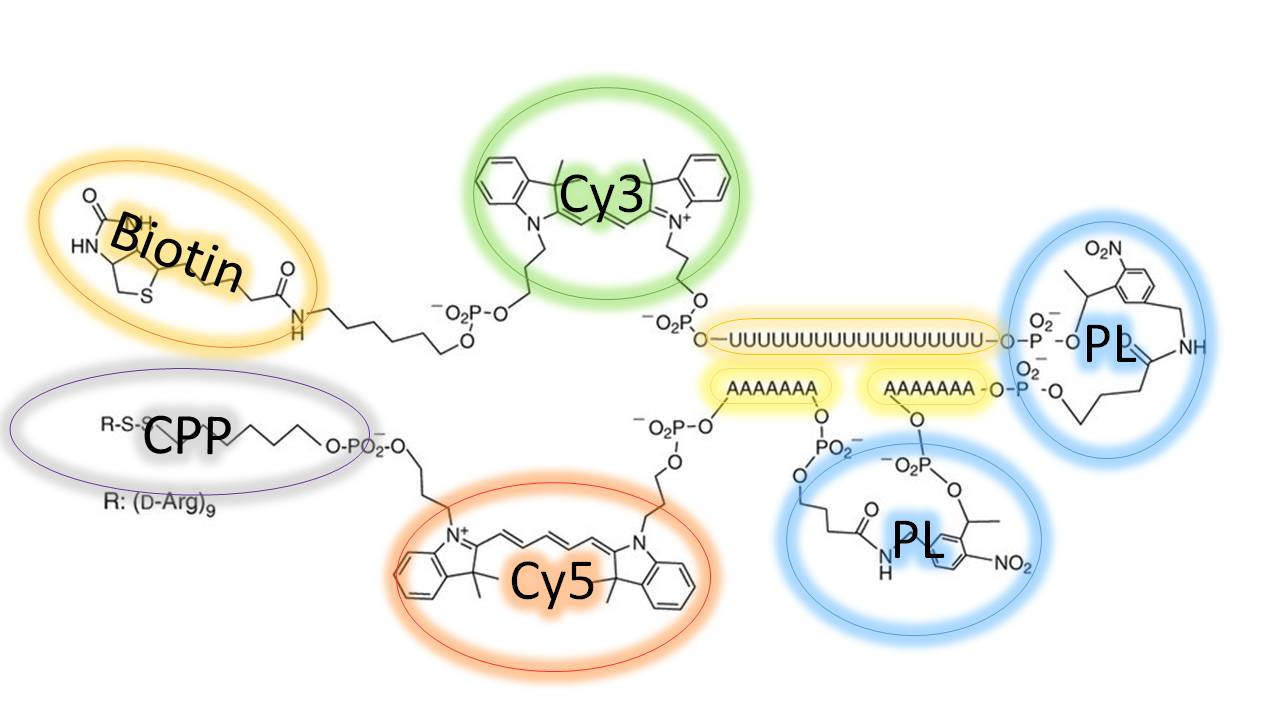
Chemical structure of a TIVA tag before photoactivation

TIVA tags are created initially via solid-phase synthesis with the cell-penetrating peptide conjugated afterwards. The functional components of the tag can be summarized as following:

- Biotin: binds to streptavidin beads for tag isolation.
- Cy3 fluorophore: used to validated cleavage of photocleavable linker. If cleaved, cell will appear green upon exposure to 514 nm light.
- Cy5 fluorophore: used to validate uptake into cells. If uptake is successful, and if Cy5 is not yet cleaved from the TIVA tag, energy from a 514 nm light will be absorbed via FRET from Cy3 to Cy5, where cells that have taken up the TIVA will appear red.
- PolyU 18-mer oligonucleotide: used to bind mRNA via complementary base pairing of their polyadenylated tails. Before cleavage of photocleavable linkers, it is caged by complementary base pairing to two polyA 7-mer oligonucleotides.
- PolyA 7-mer oligonucleotides: before the cleavage of photocleavable linkers, 2 polyA 7-mer molecules conjugate to polyU oligonucleotides to cage the TIVA tag, and thus prevent it from binding mRNA molecules. After photocleavable linkers are cleaved, the melting temperature decreases from 59 °C to less than 25 °C, leading to the disassociation of the PolyA 7-mer oligonucleotides from the TIVA tag.
- Photocleavable linker: links and stabilizes Cy5 fluorophore and PolyA 7-mer oligonucleotides to the TIVA tag. It is cleaved upon photoactivation.
- Cell-penetrating peptide CPP: guides the TIVA tag through cell membranes into tissues. It is linked to the TIVA tag by a disulphide bond that is cleaved once exposed to extracellular environment.

== Methodology of a TIVA Experiment ==
A TIVA tag mRNA isolation experiment

=== Tissue preparation ===
Tissue fixation is performed by chemical fixation using formalin. This prevents the postmortem degeneration of the tissue and hardens soft tissue. The tissue is dehydrated using ethanol and the alcohol is cleared using an organic solvent such as xylene. The tissue is embedded in paraffin which infiltrates the microscopic spaces present throughout the tissue. The embedded tissue is sliced using a microtome and subsequently stained to produce contrast needed to visualize the tissue.

=== Loading of the TIVA tag into cells and validation ===
A cell saline buffer containing the TIVA tag is added to the coverslip and incubated. During the incubation period, the TIVA tag penetrates the cell membrane via the CPP that is bound to it. Subsequently, the cytosolic environment cleaves the CPP and the TIVA tag is trapped inside the cell. After incubation, the coverslip is rinsed twice with cell saline buffer and then transferred to an imaging chamber. Using a confocal microscope, loading of the tag is confirmed by detecting the Cy5 signal at a wavelength of 561 nm.

=== Photoactivation of the TIVA tag in target cell and validation ===
Photolysis is performed resulting in photoactivation of the TIVA tag in the target cell or cells. Specifically, uncaging of the TIVA tag is accomplished using a 405-nm laser while measuring FRET excited by 514 nm. During this process, the mRNA-capturing moiety is released and subsequently anneals to the poly(A) tail of cellular mRNA. To confirm that the cell is not damaged during photolysis, the cell is imaged with the confocal microscope.

=== Extraction, lysis of target cell and affinity purification of TIVA tag ===
Using a glass pipette, the photolysed cell is isolated by aspiration. Cells are lysed and affinity purification is performed using streptavidin-coated beads that bind, immobilize and purify the biotinylated TIVA tag.

=== RNA-seq analysis ===
RNA-seq uses reverse transcriptase to convert the mRNA template to cDNA. During library preparation, the cDNA is fragmented into small pieces, which then serve as the template for sequencing. After sequencing RNA-seq analysis can then be performed.

== Advantages and Disadvantages ==
=== Advantages ===
- Noninvasive method for capturing mRNA from single cells in living, intact tissues for transcriptome analysis.
- Though other methods can be applied, such as laser capture microdissection and patch-pipette aspiration to isolate single cells, With TIVA Tags no damage to the cells and no tissue deformation from penetration of the pipette that may alter components of the transcriptional profile.
- Can be performed on various cell types, while existing methods depend on transgenic rodent models to identify cells of interest.

=== Disadvantages ===
- CPPs have been used to transport a variety of biomolecules into cells in both vitro and in vivo. One must be cautious of which CPPs are used. For example, different CPPs promote movement into different cell types and cellular components.
- If the TIVA tag is not used within 3 months of synthesis, the FRET signal is weakened.
- The storage of TIVA tag requires a -80 °C freezer and should be in dried form.
