= Hino (surname) =

Hino (written: 日野 or 火野 lit. "sun field" or "fire field") is a Japanese surname. Notable people with the surname include:

- Akihiro Hino (日野 晃博; born 1968), Japanese video game designer and businessman
- Ashihei Hino (火野 葦平; 1907 – 1960), Japanese soldier
- Hideshi Hino (日野 日出志; born 1946), Japanese manga artist, author of Hino Horror
- Keizo Hino (日野 啓三; 1929 – 2002), Japanese author
- Kumazō Hino (日野 熊蔵; 1878 – 1946), Japanese inventor and aviation pioneer
- Manami Hino (桧野 真奈美; born 1980), Japanese bobsledder
- Matsuri Hino (樋野 まつり, fl. 1999), Japanese manga artist
- Ryuju Hino (日野 龍樹; born 1995), Japanese figure skater
- Satoshi Hino (日野 聡; born 1978), Japanese voice actor
- Shigefumi Hino (日野 重文; born 1963), Japanese graphics designer, game director and planner from Nintendo
- Shōhei Hino (火野 正平; born 1949), Japanese actor and singer
- Suguru Hino (日野 優; born 1982), Japanese football player
- Takeshi Hino (日野 剛志; born 1990), Japanese international rugby union player
- Terumasa Hino (日野 皓正; born 1942), Japanese jazz trumpet, cornet and flügelhorn player
- Tomiko Hino (日野 富子; 1440–1496), official wife of Ashikaga Yoshimasa
- Yuji Hino (火野 裕士; born 1985), Japanese professional wrestler

== Fictional characters ==
- Akane Hino (日野あかね) or Cure Sunny, a main character in the anime series Smile PreCure! (known as Kelsey Ace/Glitter Sunny in Glitter Force releases)
  - Daigo Hino (日野 大悟), Akane's father (known only as "Kelsey's Dad" in Glitter Force releases)
  - Genki Hino (日野げんき), Akane's younger brother (known only as "Kelsey's Brother" in Glitter Force releases)
  - Masako Hino (日野 正子), Akane's mother (known only as "Kelsey's Mom" in Glitter Force releases)
- Eiji Hino (火野 映司), the title character in Kamen Rider OOO
- Emu Hino (日野 絵霧), a main character from Crying Freeman
- Kahoko Hino (日野 香穂子), a character from La Corda d'Oro
- Kenichi Hino (火野 ケンイチ), the title character in MegaMan NT Warrior
- Rei Hino (火野 レイ) (Raye Hino in early English releases) or Sailor Mars, a main character in Sailor Moon
  - Risa Hino, Rei's deceased mother
  - Grandpa Hino, Rei's grandfather
  - Takashi Hino, Rei's father
- Shunsuke Hino (日野 俊介), the Yellow Ranger from the 1989 Super Sentai series Kousoku Sentai Turboranger
- Shōzō Hino & Tomoe Hino (日野 昇造 & 日野巴), characters from Amai Seikatsu
