= Pältre =

Village in Estonia

- Location within Estonia
- Coordinates: 57°39′7″N 27°17′35″E
- Country: Estonia
- County: Võru County
- Municipality: Rõuge Parish

Population (2011)
  - Total: 2
- Time zone: UTC+2 (EET)

Pältre is a settlement in Rõuge Parish, Võru County in southeastern Estonia. Between 1991–2017 (until the administrative reform of Estonian municipalities) the village was located in Misso Parish.
