= Solomon Tsehaye =

Eritrean poet and politician (born 1956)

Solomon Tsehaye Beraki (Tigrinya: ሰሎሞን ጸሃየ; born December 1956 in Addi Quitta) is an Eritrean poet, academic and politician. He wrote the national anthem of Eritrea, "Eritrea, Eritrea, Eritrea". As of 2019, he was working in the Eritrean Ministry of Education.

== Biography ==
Solomon was born in December 1956 in Addi Quetta, a village in southern Eritrea. He attended elementary school in Eritrea before moving to Addis Ababa after passing an entrance exam and winning a scholarship at the then British-run General Wingate Secondary School, a boarding school. He returned to Eritrea after the 1974 military coup brought the Derg to power.

From April 1977 to 1991, Solomon served as a soldier and 'barefoot doctor' in the Eritrean People's Liberation Front (EPLF) during the Eritrean War of Independence. Wounded in action, he was reassigned to the rear of the EPLF, where in late 1979, at a time when cultural activities were highly encouraged by the EPLF for all members, Solomon began to engage in writing plays, composing poetry and acting. In mid-1981, he was transferred to work full-time as an artist in the EPLF's Division of Culture and was later appointed head of the division in 1987, serving until Eritrea's victory in the war in 1991.

In 1986, Solomon wrote a poem that would come to serve as the national anthem of Eritrea. Upon Eritrea's independence in 1993, he made some changes to the words for its adoption as the national anthem, titled "Eritrea, Eritrea, Eritrea".

Solomon has contributed to several issues of the EPLF's and later Eritrean government's Netsebraq arts and culture magazine. He has also served as Director of the Cultural Affairs Bureau in the Ministry of Education of Eritrea.

== Bibliography ==
=== Poems ===
- The Tithe of War
- Sacred Gift
- Goodbye Kitchen!

=== Books ===
- Sahel (1994)
- Sahel (2nd edition) (2006)
- Massén Melqesn Qeddamot (Massé and Melqes of the Ancestors) (2013)
