= Tsegaye Degineh =

Ethiopian economist (born 1969)

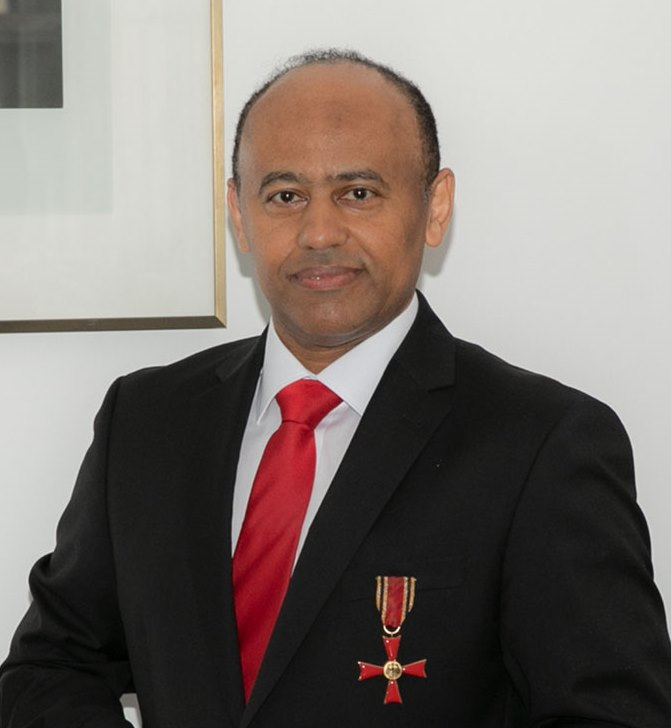
Tsegaye Degineh, 2021

Tsegaye Degineh Gugssa (Ge'ez: ፀጋዬ ደግነህ ጉግሣ, born April 1969) is an Ethiopian economist. He is holder of the Federal Cross of Merit, knowledge transfer activist and the first Ethiopian mainly brought modern Ju-Jitsu to Ethiopia and spread IJF Judo. Degineh is the son of Degineh Gugssa, Major General of the last Ethiopian Emperor Haile Selassie, and Leawish Melese. His youngest daughter, Saron, is a German actress. He received his Ph.D. (2000) at the Department of Economics and Business Administration, Humboldt University Berlin and holds 6th Dan in Ju-Jitsu that initially dominated by the style of the German Ju-Jitsu Federation.

He is known as the founder and the first Patron Board President of the Ju-Jitsu Association in Ethiopia (2007) and later the first Board Patron of Judo that merged with the Ju-Jitsu in 2011. He was also Vice President of the Ju-Jitsu African Union (2010), and currently honorary vice president of JJAFU. In 2016 he has been elected as Vice President of the Ethics Commission by Ju-Jitsu International Federation and has been Head of Sustainability since 2020. He is also actively involved with the African Judo Union and is a Judo for Peace Commissioner at the International Judo Federation. Degineh enabled the participation of Ethiopian Athletes in World Judo Championships 2011 and World Ju-Jitsu Championships 2010 for the first time ever in the sports' history of Ethiopia. In April 2019, Ethiopia won the first ever gold medal in its history at the African Ju-Jitsu Championship in Morocco.

In June 2021, he was awarded the Federal Cross of Merit on Ribbon of the Federal Republic of Germany by the Federal President Frank-Walter Steinmeier. It was awarded to him for his commitment to the people of Germany, Ethiopia and Africa, linked to the goal of development, peace, fairness, education and the transfer of values through sport as well. He was also honoured with the Ethiopian Good Person Recognation of the Year (Ye Begosew Award) in September 2023.

In May 2014, he has received the highest golden needle of honor of the German Ju-Jutsu Federation for his outstanding engagement to spread Ju-Jitsu and sport across the world particularly in Africa, Ethiopia and in December 2019, he was honored by the Mayor of Addis Ababa for his long voluntary engagement in Judo & Ju-Jitsu and for enabling the contribution of the Ethiopian athletes to Africa and World respectively.

Degineh is also known for his professional papers, interviews and textbooks especially in Amharic language “Project Management Guide for millennium Ethiopia” and “Ju-Jitsu-Martial Art Philosophy and Basic Techniques” and in German language “Property Rights during the economic reform” (Property Rights während der Wirtschaftsreform). He is involved on knowledge transfer in Ethiopia particularly with conveying the value of the German development experiences and for raising the issue of dual citizenship digital mindset, work culture and sustainability.

== Awards ==
- 2014: Golden Needle of Honor of DJJV
- 2019: Recognition Award of Addis Ababa Sport, awarded by the Mayor of the City of Addis Ababa
- 2021: Federal Cross of Merit of the Federal Republic of Germany
- 2022: Recognition Award on Diaspora Role model awarded by the Ethiopian Community in Germany
- 2023: Ye Begosew Recognition (Good Person of the Year) in Ethiopia
- 2024: Honorary Vice President Ju-Jitsu Africa Union
