= Heino Sild =

Estonian athletics competitor

Heino Sild (10 April 1944 – 9 May 2009) was an Estonian track and field athlete, who mostly competed in shot put events.

He was born in Tallinn.

He started his athletics exercising under the guidance of Viktor Vaiksaar. 1979–1980 he competed at the final of Soviet Union Championships.

1972–1985 he won 8 times Estonian championships in shot put. 1971–1985 he was a member of Estonian national athletics team.
