= Heino (surname) =

Heino is a Finnish surname. Notable people with the surname include:

- Henri Heino (born 1986), Finnish ice hockey forward
- Lauri Heino (1918–2001), Finnish military sergeant
- Martti and Elise Heino, the victims of the 2001 Heino murders
- Otto and Vivika Heino, American ceramic artists
- Pekka Heino (television presenter) (born 1961), Finnish-Swedish television presenter
- Pekka Heino (singer) (born 1976), Finnish singer (Brother Firetribe)
- Viljo Heino (1914–1998), Finnish track and field athlete and Olympic competitor

== See also ==
- Christopher Heino-Lindberg (born 1985), Swedish ice hockey goaltender
