= Heino Jürisalu =

Estonian composer

- Born: August 13, 1930; Tartu, Estonia
- Died: April 18, 1991 (aged 60); Tallinn, Estonia
- Occupation: Estonian Composer

Hein Jürisalu (August 13, 1930, Tartu, Estonia – April 18, 1991, Tallinn, Estonia) was an Estonian composer. His parents were Artur Jürisalu and Anfissa Jürisalu.

== Life ==
In 1954, he graduated from Tallinn State Conservatory with a specialty in composition.

From 1970 until 1988, he was the leader of music ensemble Consortium.

From 1969 until 1991, he taught the composition at Tallinn State Conservatory (since 1985 Associate Professor).

From 1956, he was a member of Estonian Composers' Union.

His wife was Vilma Jürisalu. His sister was Asta Kask. His children are S.S.T Jürisalu and Mart Jürisalu.

== Works ==
- "Sümfoniett" (1959)
- "Sinfonie Nr. 1, Pastoraalid" (1970)
- "Sinfonie Nr. 2" (1975)
- "opera "Püha Susanna" (1983)
