= Rammuka, Võru County =

Village in Estonia

Rammuka
- Location within Estonia
- Coordinates: 57°33′0″N 27°13′0″E
- Country: Estonia
- County: Võru County
- Municipality: Rõuge Parish
- Time zone: UTC+2 (EET)

Rammuka is a village in Rõuge Parish, Võru County, Estonia. Between 1991 and 2017 (until the administrative reform of Estonian municipalities) the village was located in Misso Parish.
