= Heino Lind =

Estonian sailor and sport personnel

Heino Lind (12 July 1931 Tallinn – 22 August 2008 Tallinn) was an Estonian sailor and sport personnel.

In 1954 he graduated from Tallinn Polytechnical Institute in electrical engineering.

In 1977 he was one of the winners of Baltic Cup. From 1972 to 1977 he became the 5-time Estonian champion in different sailing disciplines.

From 1992 to 2001 he was a member of Estonian Olympic Committee.

Awards:

- 1974: honorary member of Estonian Sports Association Kalev
