= Parmu =

Village in Estonia

- Village
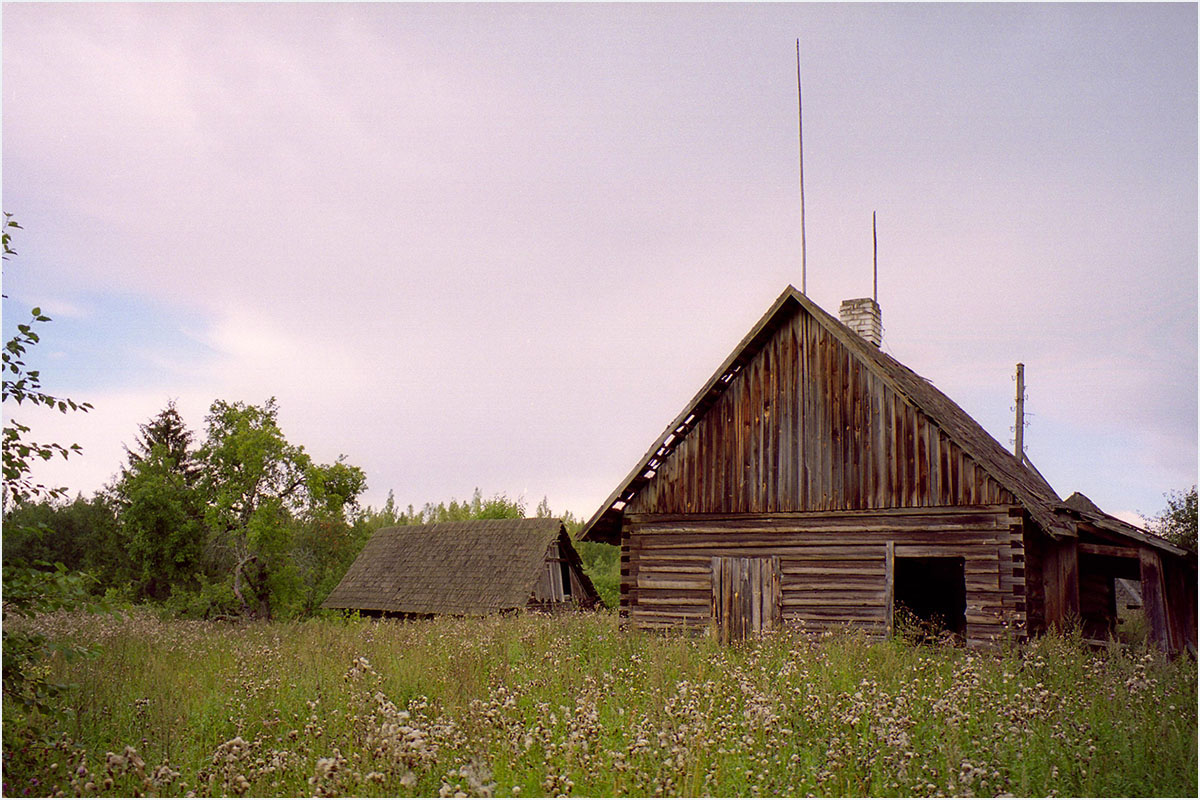

- Location within Estonia
- Coordinates: 57.5289°N 27.3447°E
- Country: Estonia
- County: Võru County
- Parish: Rõuge Parish

Area
  - Total: 14 km^{2} (5.4 sq mi)
- Time zone: UTC+2 (EET)
  - Summer (DST): UTC+3 (EEST)

Parmu is a village in Rõuge Parish, Võru County in Estonia.
