= Tsegay =

Tsegaye (Amharic: ፀጋዬ), Tsegai, or Tsegay (Tigrinya: ፀጋይ) is a male name of Ethiopian-Eritrean origin. Notable people with the name include:

== Tsegaye ==
- Tsegaye Degineh (born 1969), Ethiopian martial arts advocate
- Tsegaye Gabre-Medhin (1936–2006), Ethiopian writer and Poet Laureate
- Tsegaye Segne (born 1964), Ethiopian long-distance runner
- Marcus Velado-Tsegaye (born 2001), Canadian soccer player
- Michael Tsegaye (born 1979), Ethiopian artist and photographer
- Tirfi Tsegaye (born 1984), Ethiopian long-distance runner specialising in the marathon

== Tsegai ==
- Atsedu Tsegay (born 1991), Ethiopian long-distance runner specialising in the half marathon
- Genet Tsegay (born 1992), Ethiopian beauty pageant contestant
- Gudaf Tsegay (born 1997), Ethiopian middle-distance runner
- Samuel Tsegay (born 1988), Eritrean long-distance runner specialising in the 5000 metres and 10,000 metres
- Yemane Tsegay (born 1985), Ethiopian long distance runner specialising in the marathon
