= Kiviora =

Village in Estonia

Kivioru
- Location within Estonia
- Coordinates: 57°34′0″N 27°18′0″E
- Country: Estonia
- County: Võru County
- Municipality: Rõuge Parish
- Time zone: UTC+2 (EET)

Kiviora (before 1997 Kivioru) is a village in Rõuge Parish, Võru County, Estonia. Between 1991–2017 (until the administrative reform of Estonian municipalities) the village was located in Misso Parish.
