= Kimalasõ =

Village in Estonia

- Location within Estonia
- Coordinates: 57°35′0″N 27°13′0″E
- Country: Estonia
- County: Võru County
- Municipality: Rõuge Parish
- Time zone: UTC+2 (EET)

Kimalasõ (known as Kimalase before 1997) is a village in Rõuge Parish, Võru County in southeastern Estonia. Between 1991 and 2017 (until the administrative reform of Estonian municipalities) the village was located in Misso Parish.
