= Hino, Põlva County =

Village in Estonia

Hino
- Village
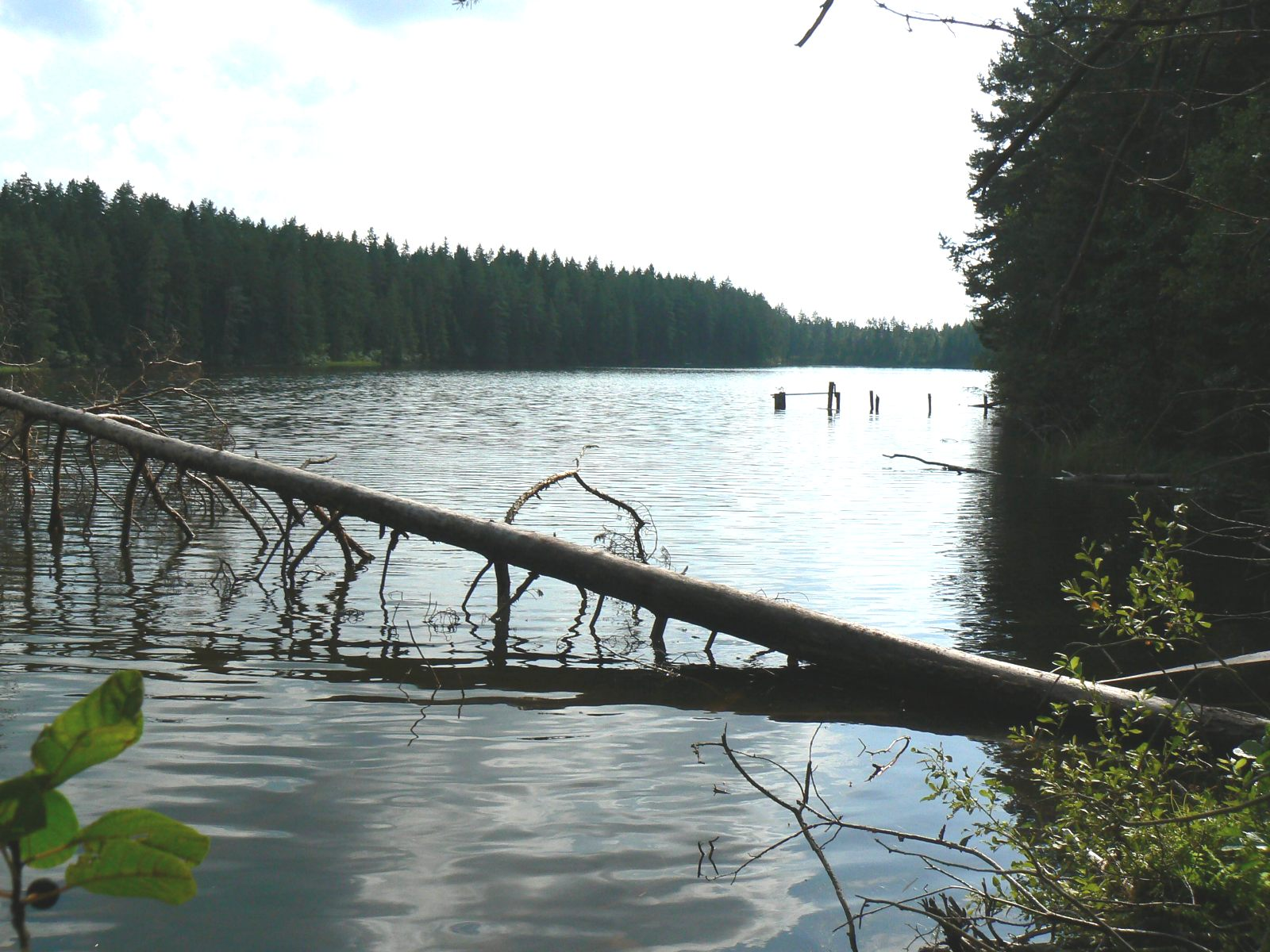
- Trees in Estonia

- Location within Estonia
- Coordinates: 57°58′33″N 26°43′20″E
- Country: Estonia
- County: Põlva County
- Parish: Kanepi Parish
- Time zone: UTC+2 (EET)
  - Summer (DST): UTC+3 (EEST)

Hino is a village in Kanepi Parish, Põlva County in southeastern Estonia.

The sculptor August Weizenberg (1837–1921) was born in the Ritsike tavern in Hino.
