= Hino Station (Tokyo) =

Railway station in Hino, Tokyo, Japan

JC20 Hino Station 日野駅
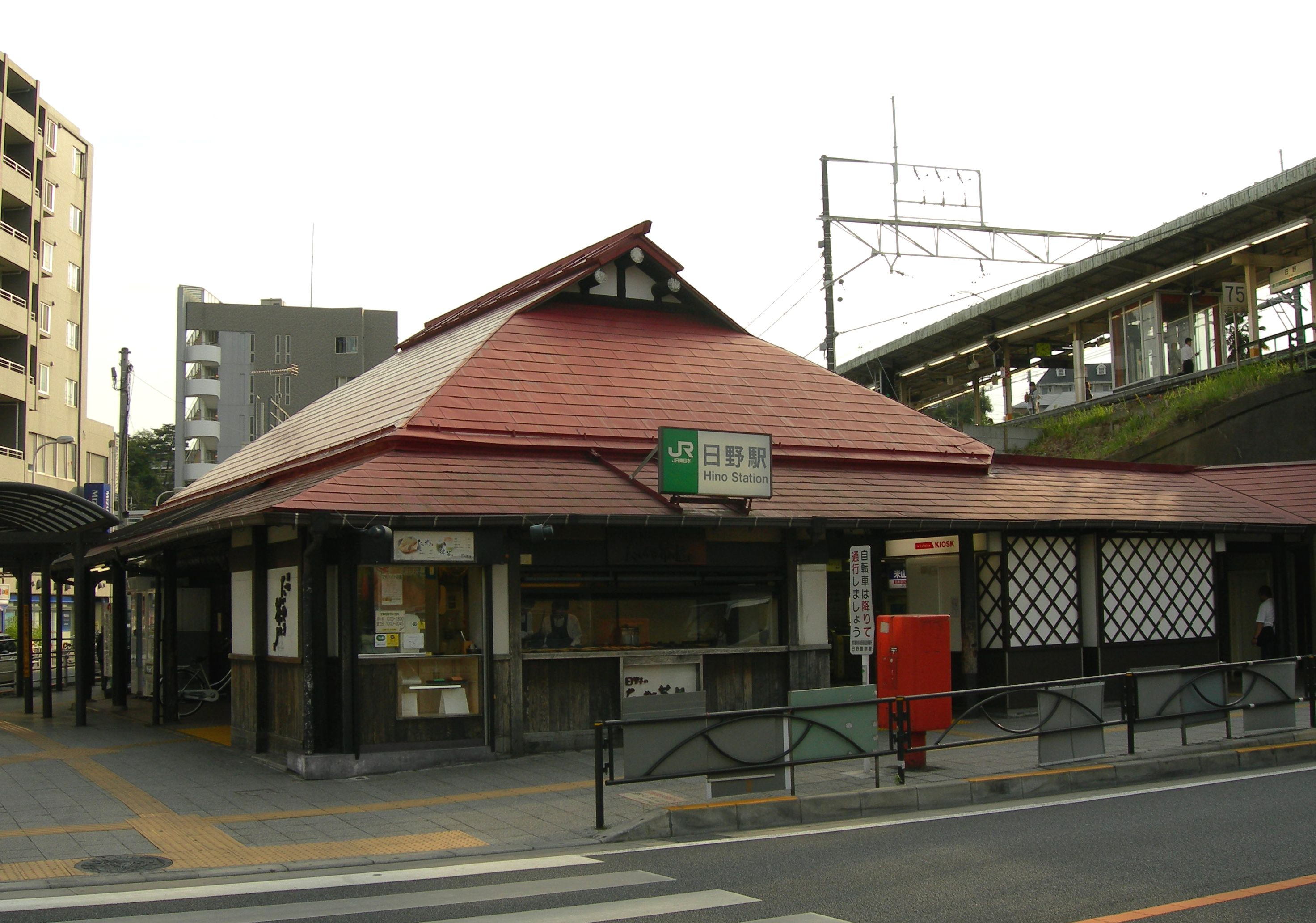
- Hino Station in April 2014

General information
- Location: 1 Osakaue, Hino-shi, Tokyo 191-0061; Japan
- Coordinates: 35°40′45″N 139°23′38″E
- Operator: JR East
- Lines: Chūō Main Line; Chūō Rapid Line
- Distance: 40.8 km from Tokyo
- Platforms: 1 island platform

Other information
- Status: Staffed
- Website: Official website

History
- Opened: 6 January 1898

Passengers
- FY2024: 45,858 (daily) ▲2.33%

Services
Preceding station	JR East	Following station
Toyoda JC21 towards Shiojiri	Chūō Main Line Local	Tachikawa JC19 Terminus
Toyoda JC21 towards Ōtsuki	Chūō Line Chūō Special Rapid	Tachikawa JC19 towards Tokyo
Toyoda JC21 towards Ōtsuki	Chūō Line Commuter Rapid	Tachikawa One-way operation
Toyoda JC21 towards Ōtsuki	Chūō Line Rapid	Tachikawa JC19 towards Tokyo
Toyoda JC21 towards Hachiōji	Musashino	Tachikawa JC19 towards Ōmiya
Location
- Location within Tokyo Location within Japan

Hino Station (日野駅, Hino-eki) is a passenger railway station located in the city of Hino, Tokyo, Japan, operated by East Japan Railway Company (JR East).

== Lines ==
Hino Station is served by the Chūō Main Line local service from Tachikawa and the Chūō Line (Rapid) limited stop service from Tokyo. The station is 40.8 kilometers from Tokyo Station.

== Station layout ==
The station consists of a single island platform serving two tracks. The station is staffed.

=== Platforms ===
1	Chuo Line (Rapid)	for Hachiōji, Takao, Ōtsuki, and Kōfu
2	Chuo Line (Rapid)	for Tachikawa, Mitaka, Shinjuku, and Tokyo

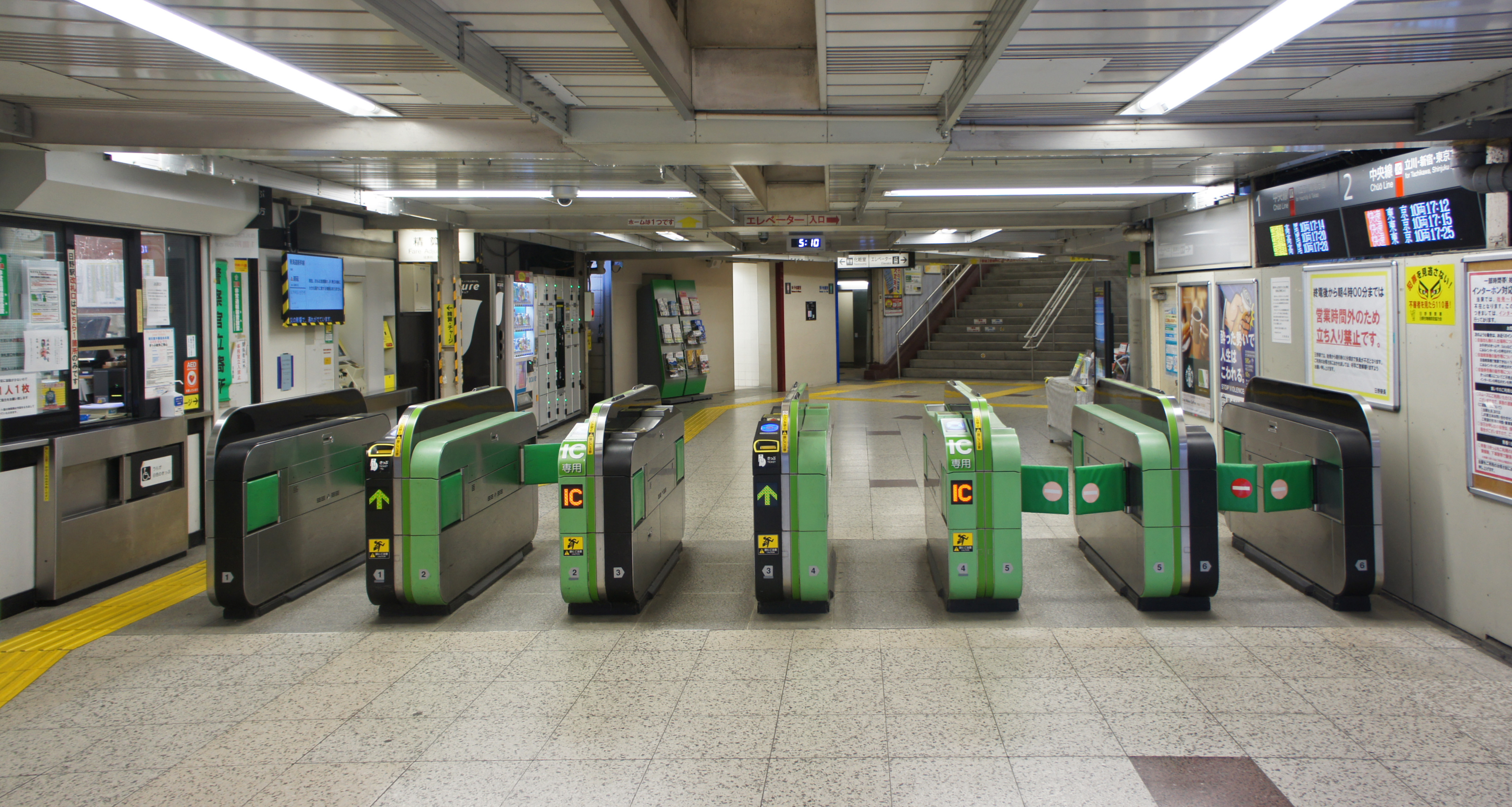
Ticket gate, April 2021

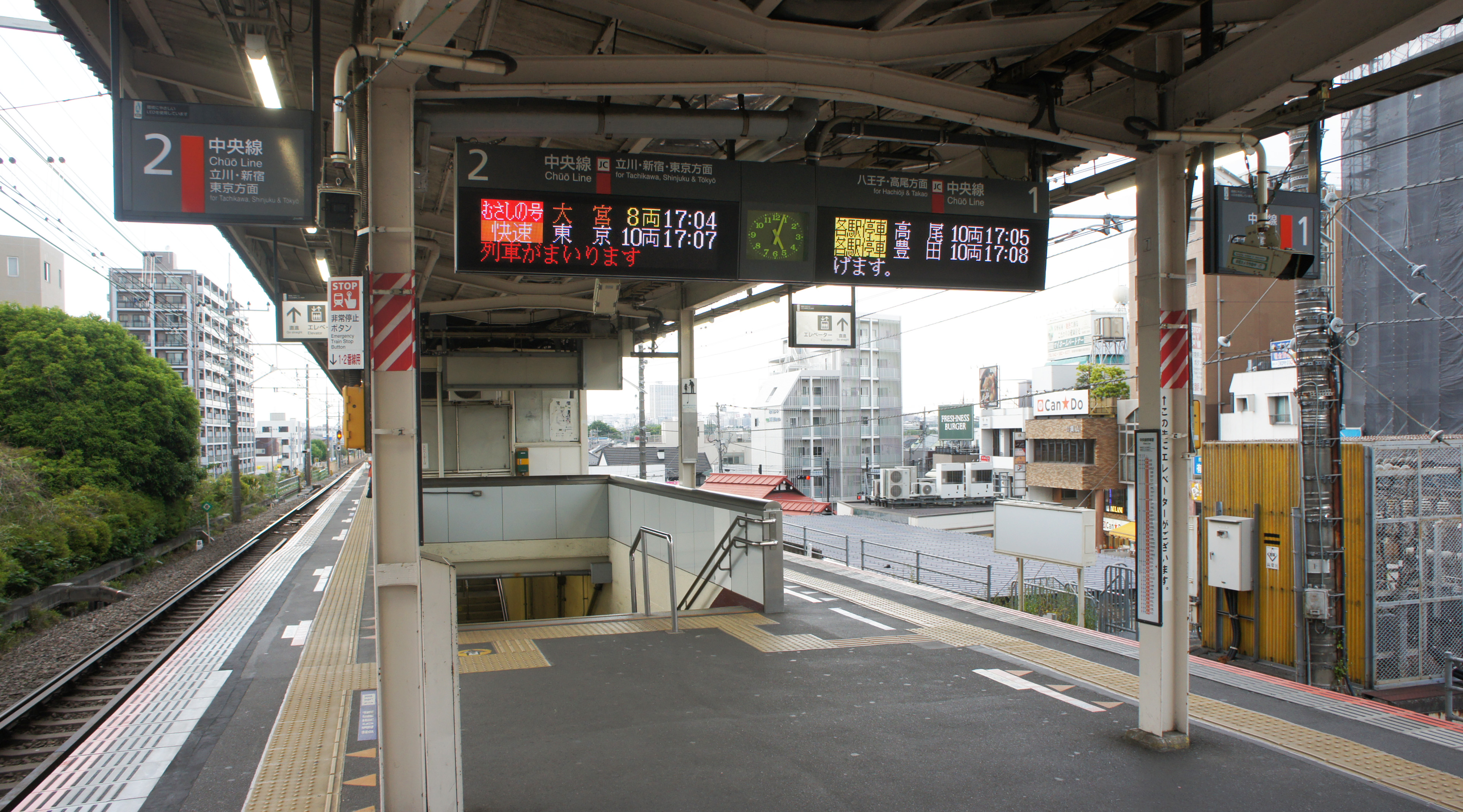
Station platform, April 2021

== History ==
Hino Station opened on 6 January 1890. With the privatization of Japanese National Railways (JNR) on 1 April 1987, the station came under the control of JR East.

== Passenger statistics ==
In fiscal 2019, the station was used by an average of 26,916 passengers daily (boarding passengers only).

The passenger figures for previous years are as shown below.

Fiscal year	Daily average
2005	26,857
2010	27,713
2015	27,179

== Surrounding area ==
- Hino City Hall
- Hino Civic Center
- Hino City Library
- Hino City Central Community Center
- Hino City Central Welfare Center
- Hino Chuo Park

== Hino Station in popular culture ==
Hino Station is portrayed in episodes 2 and 4 of the anime My Deer Friend Nokotan.

== See also ==
- List of railway stations in Japan
