= Tiilige =

Village in Estonia

Tiilike
- Location within Estonia
- Coordinates: 57°38′18″N 27°19′33″E
- Country: Estonia
- County: Võru County
- Time zone: UTC+2 (EET)

Tiilike is a settlement in Setomaa Parish, Võru County in southeastern Estonia.
