= Kaubi, Võru County =

Village in Estonia

- Village
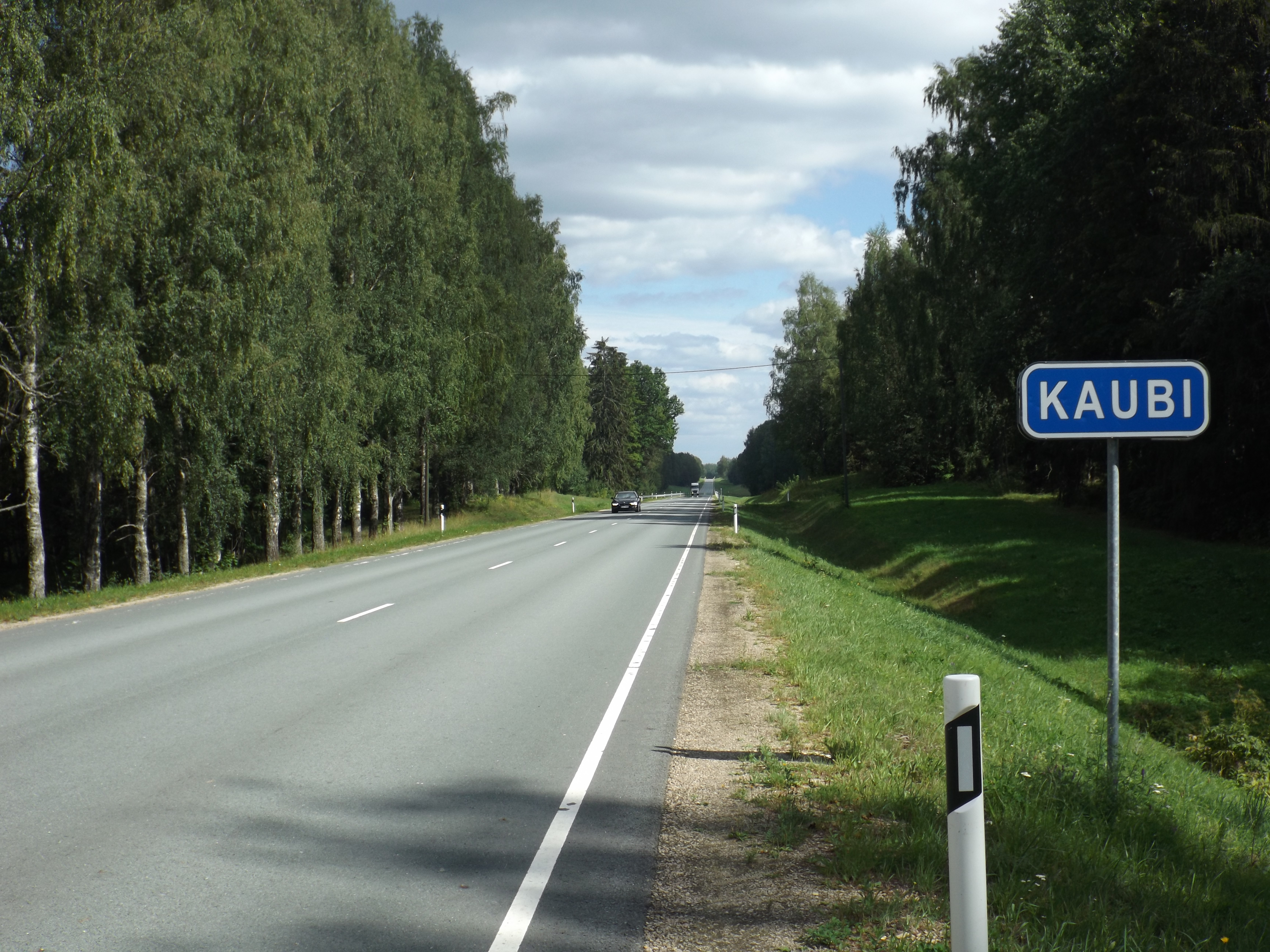
- Riga-Pskov highway in Kaubi

- Location within Estonia
- Coordinates: 57.599444444444°N 27.181111111111°E
- Country: Estonia
- County: Võru County
- Parish: Rõuge Parish
- Time zone: UTC+2 (EET)
  - Summer (DST): UTC+3 (EEST)

Kaubi is a village in Rõuge Parish, Võru County in Estonia.
