= Rebäse =

Village in Võru County, Estonia

- Village
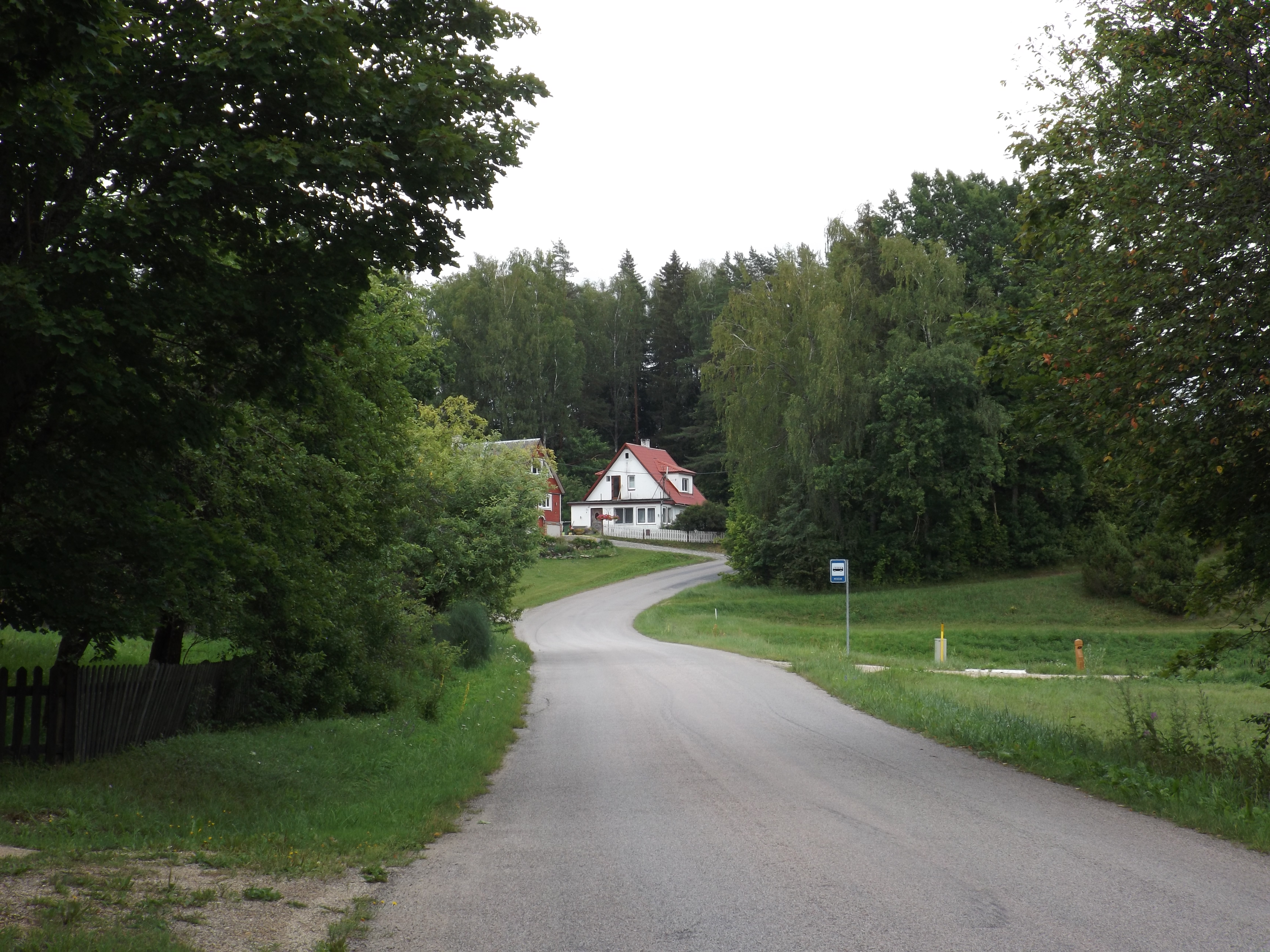
- Rebäse village bus stop

- Location within Estonia
- Coordinates: 57.72°N 26.9836°E
- Country: Estonia
- County: Võru County
- Parish: Rõuge Parish
- Time zone: UTC+2 (EET)
  - Summer (DST): UTC+3 (EEST)

Rebäse is a village in Rõuge Parish, Võru County in Estonia.
