= Misso =

Borough in Estonia

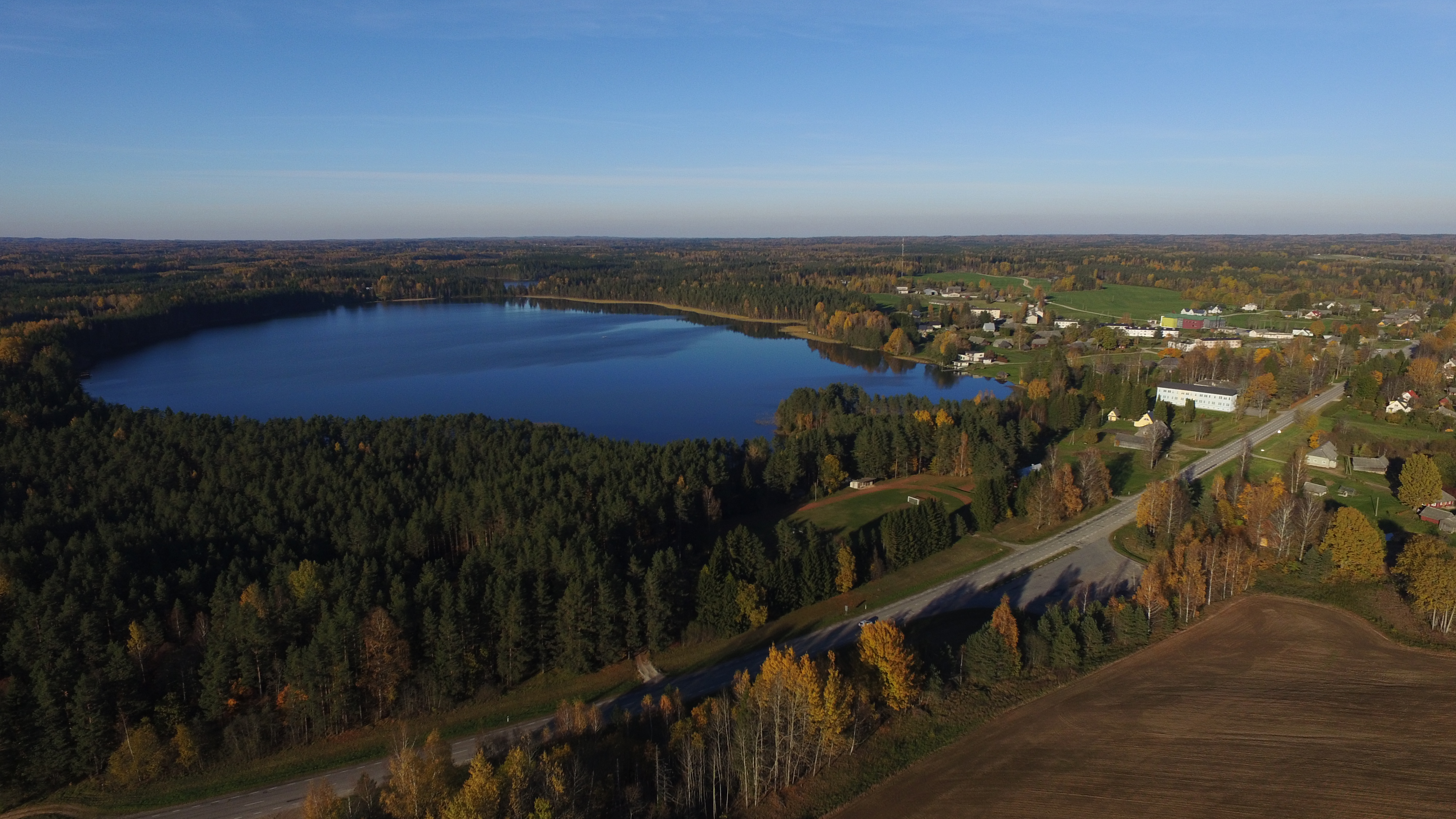
- Aerial view of Misso and Lake Pulli

- Location within Estonia
- Coordinates: 57°36′00″N 27°13′30″E
- Country: Estonia
- County: Võru
- Parish: Rõuge

Population (2008)
  - Total: 280
- Time zone: UTC+2 (EET)

Misso is a small borough (alevik) in Rõuge Parish, Võru County, in southeastern Estonia. Between 1991 and 2017 (until the administrative reform of Estonian municipalities) it was the administrative center of Misso Parish.

It is located along European route E77.
