= Vihula Parish =

Former municipality of Estonia

Coordinates: 59°34′35″N 25°57′38″E

Vihula Parish Vihula vald
- Former municipality of Estonia
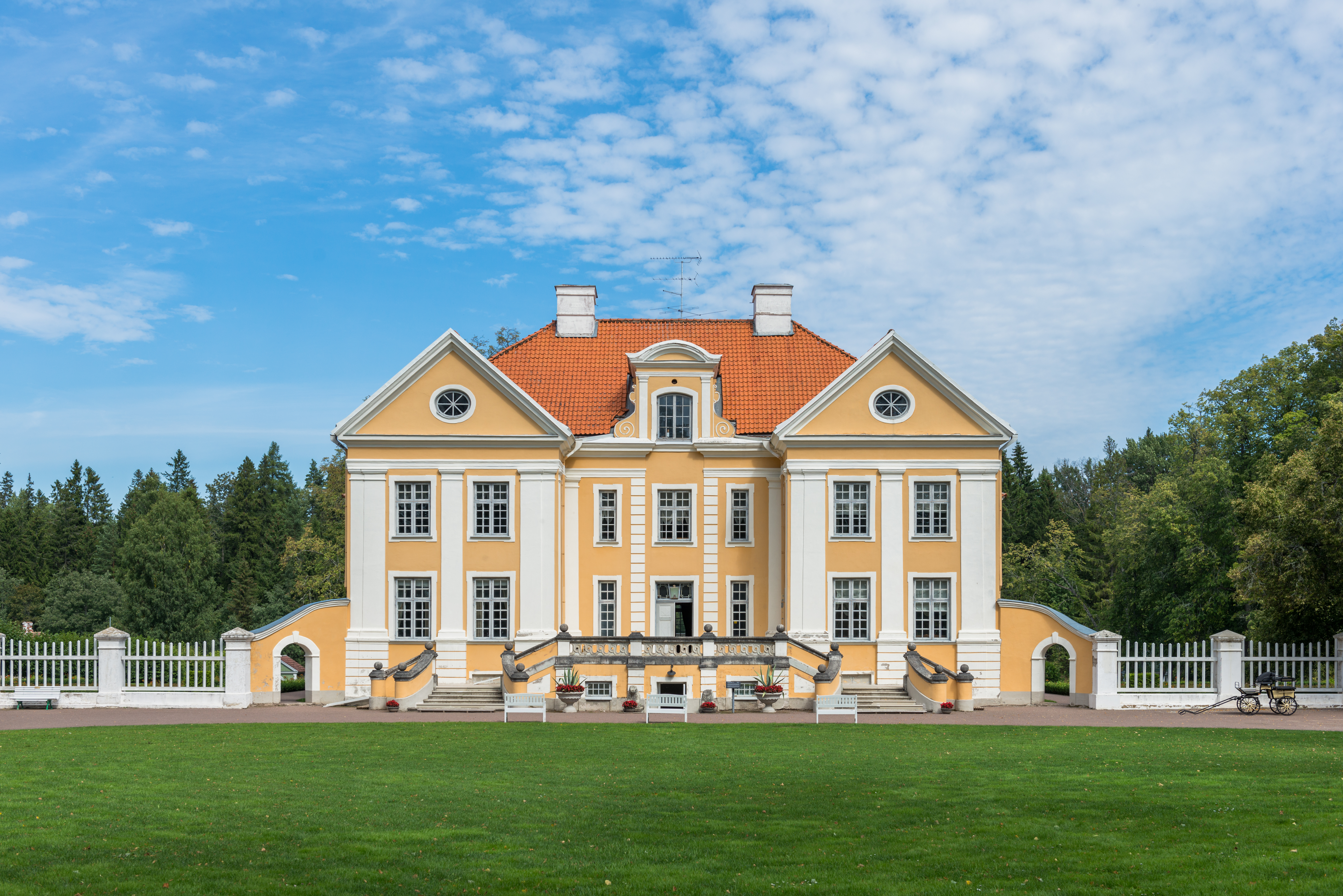
- Palmse manor

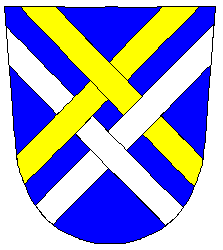
- Flag Coat of arms

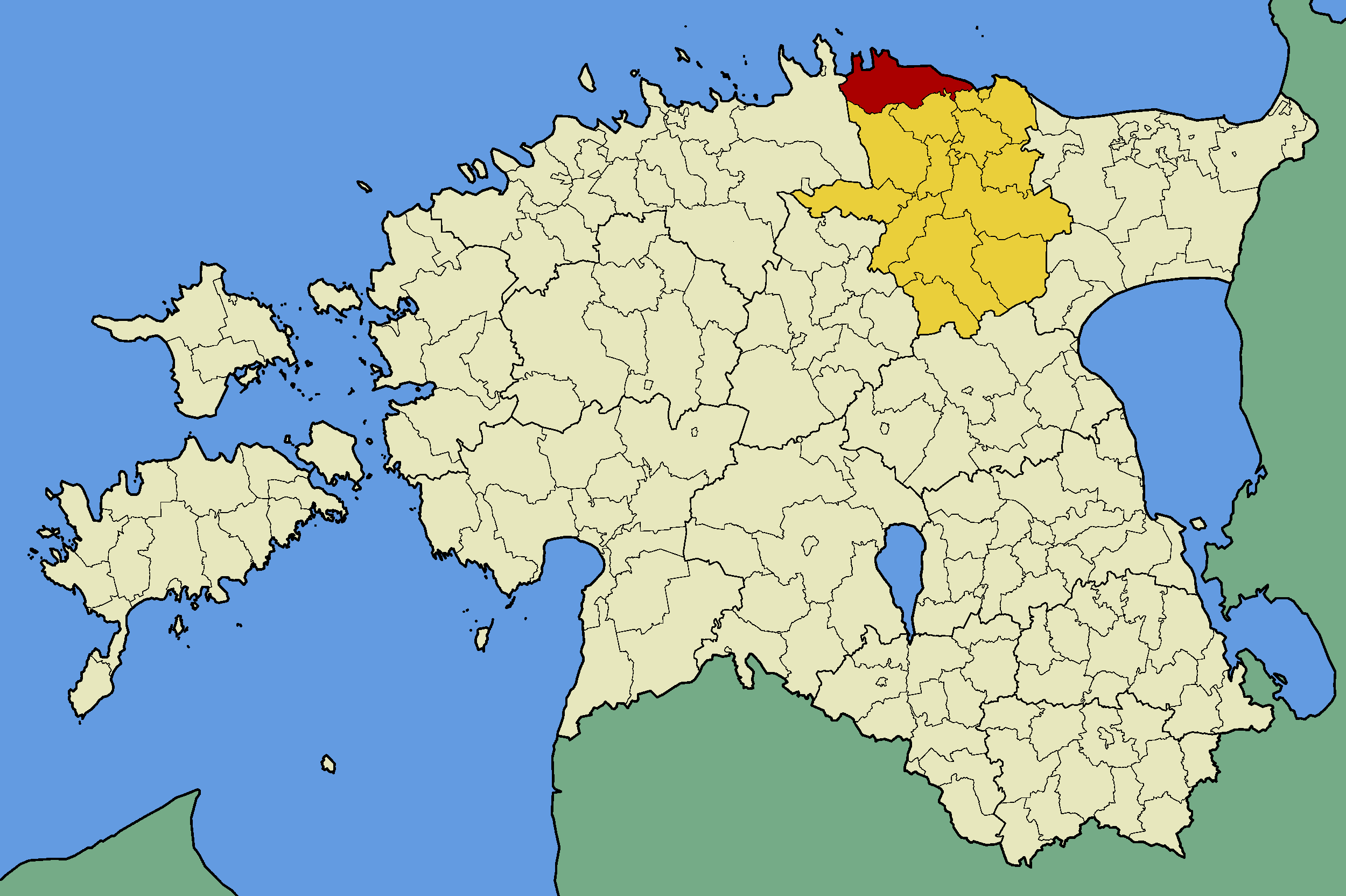
- Vihula Parish within Lääne-Viru County.
- Country: Estonia
- County: Lääne-Viru County
- Administrative centre: Võsu

Area
  - Total: 364.28 km^{2} (140.65 sq mi)

Population (01.01.2009)
  - Total: 1,939
  - Density: 5.323/km^{2} (13.79/sq mi)
- Website: www.vihula.ee

Vihula Parish (Estonian: Vihula vald) was a rural municipality of Estonia, in Lääne-Viru County. It had a population of 1,939 (as of 1 January 2009) and an area of 364.28 km^{2}.

== Settlements ==
There was 1 small borough (Võsu) and 52 villages: Aasumetsa, Adaka, Altja, Andi, Annikvere, Eisma, Eru, Haili, Ilumäe, Joandu, Kakuvälja, Karepa, Karula, Käsmu, Kiva, Koljaku, Koolimäe, Korjuse, Kosta, Lahe, Lauli, Lobi, Metsanurga, Metsiku, Muike, Mustoja, Natturi, Noonu, Oandu, Paasi, Pajuveski, Palmse, Pedassaare, Pihlaspea, Rutja, Sagadi, Sakussaare, Salatse, Tepelvälja, Tidriku, Tiigi, Toolse, Tõugu, Uusküla, Vainupea, Vatku, Vergi, Vihula, Vila, Villandi, Võhma and Võsupere.

== Gallery ==
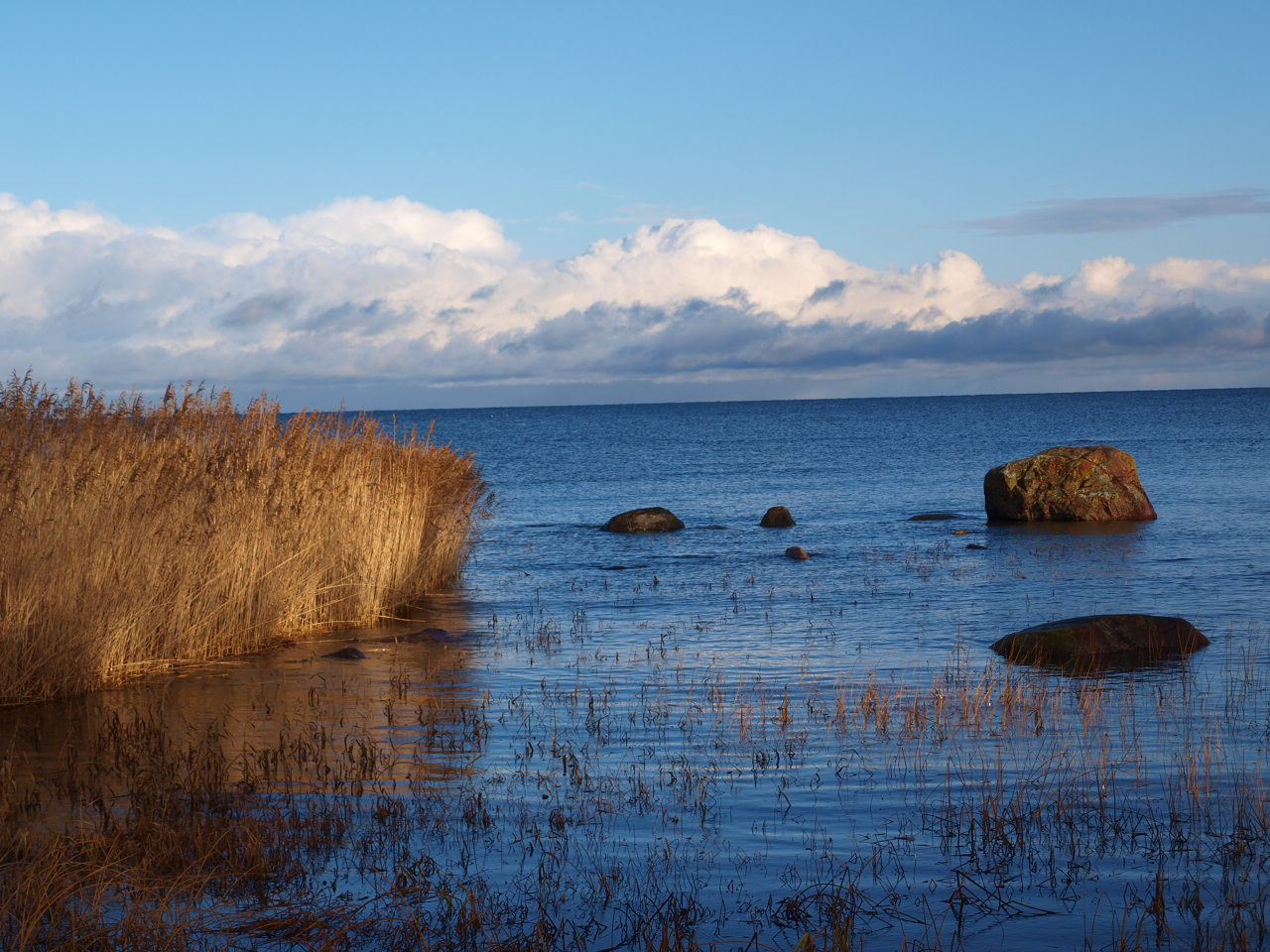
Seaside at Eisma

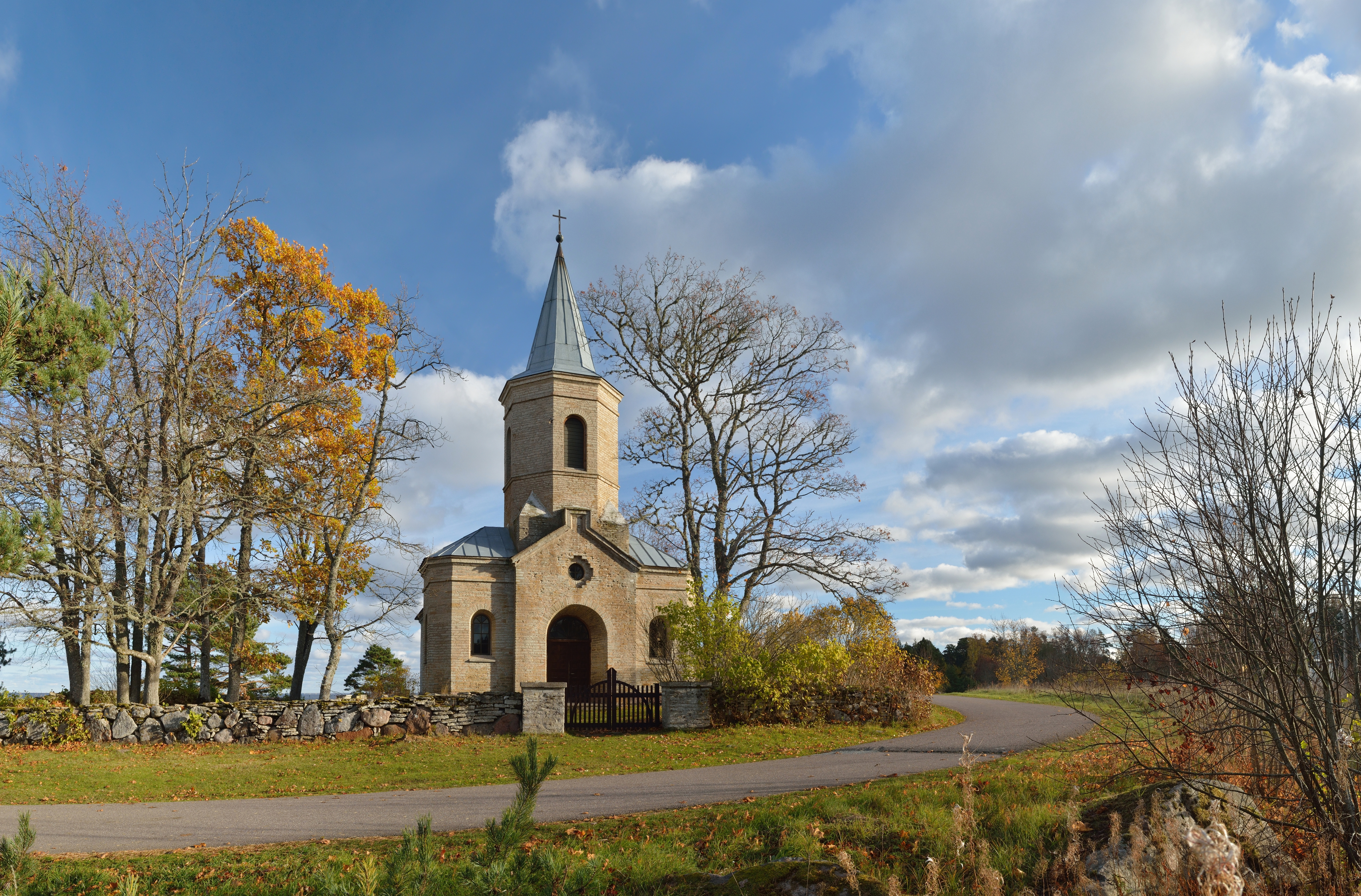
Vainupea chapel

Toolse Castle ruins

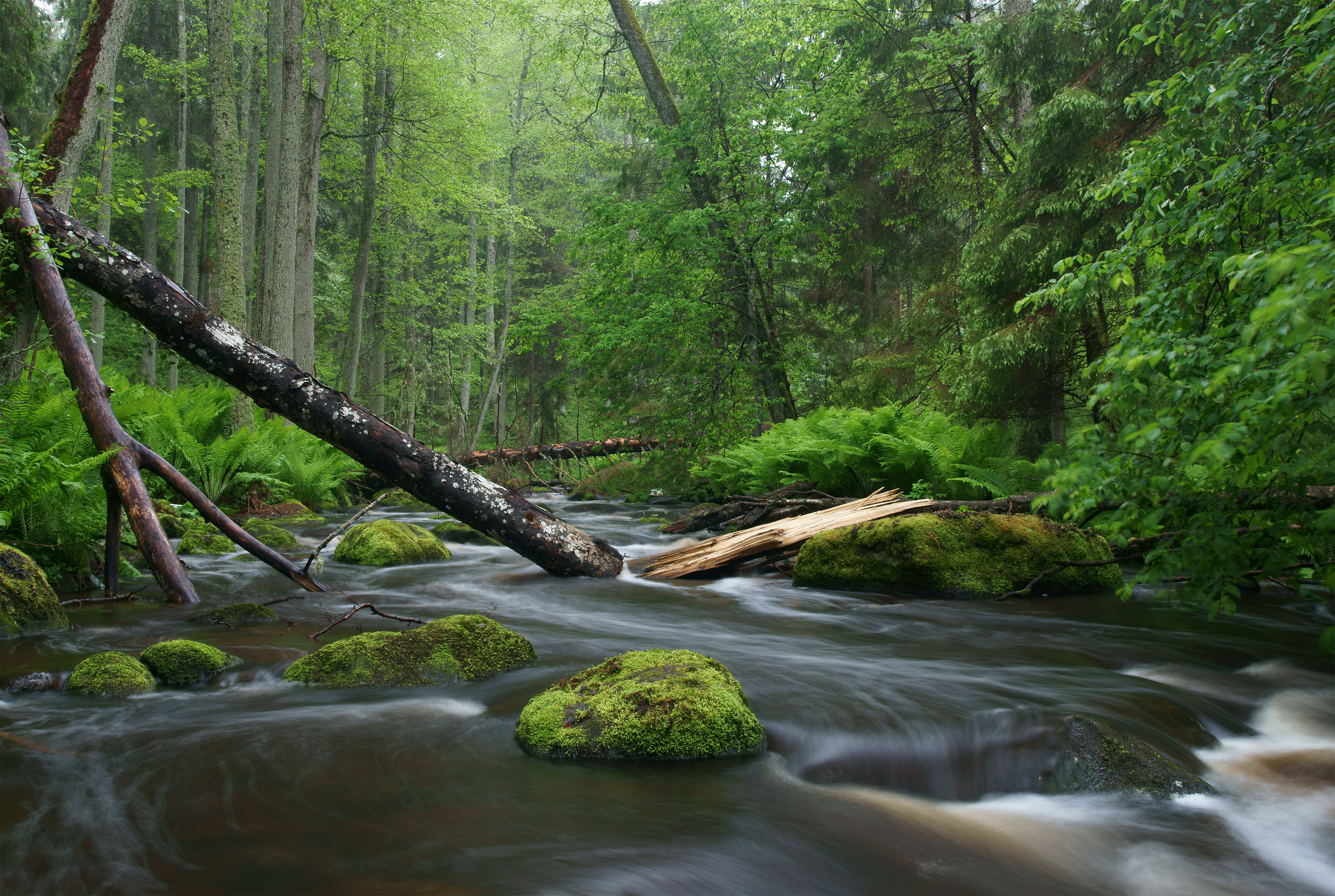
Altja river

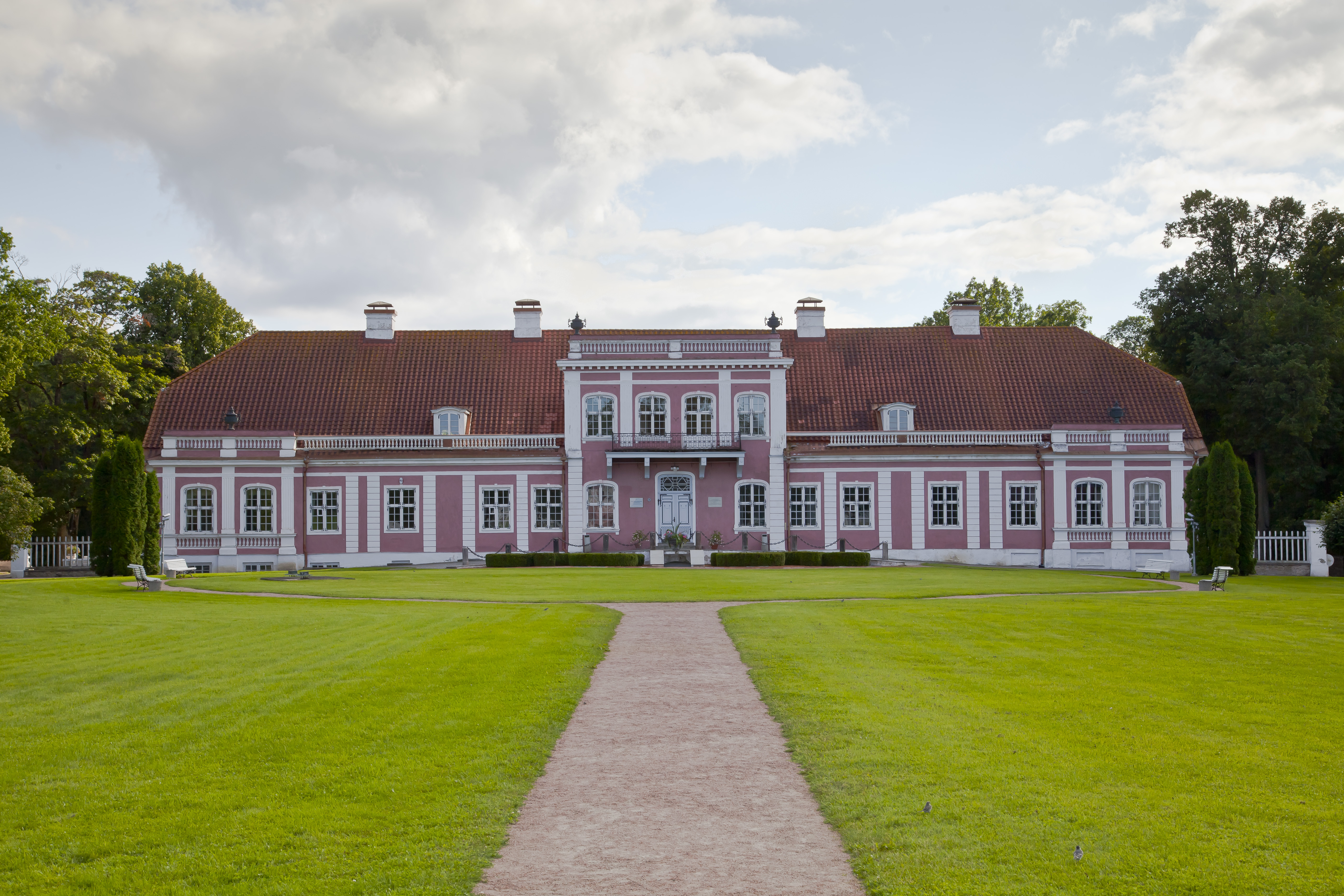
Sagadi manor

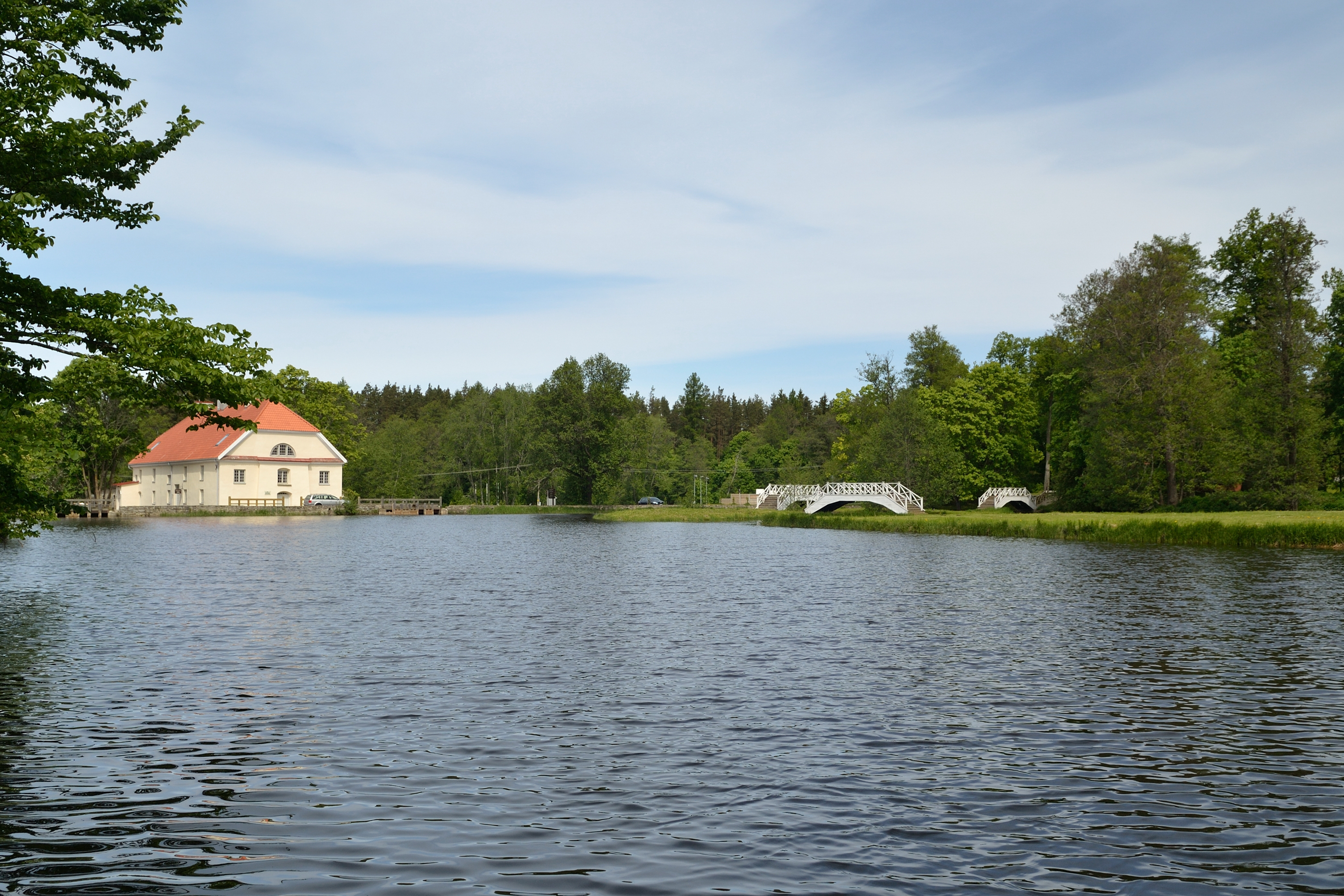
Vihula impounded mill lake in Mustoja

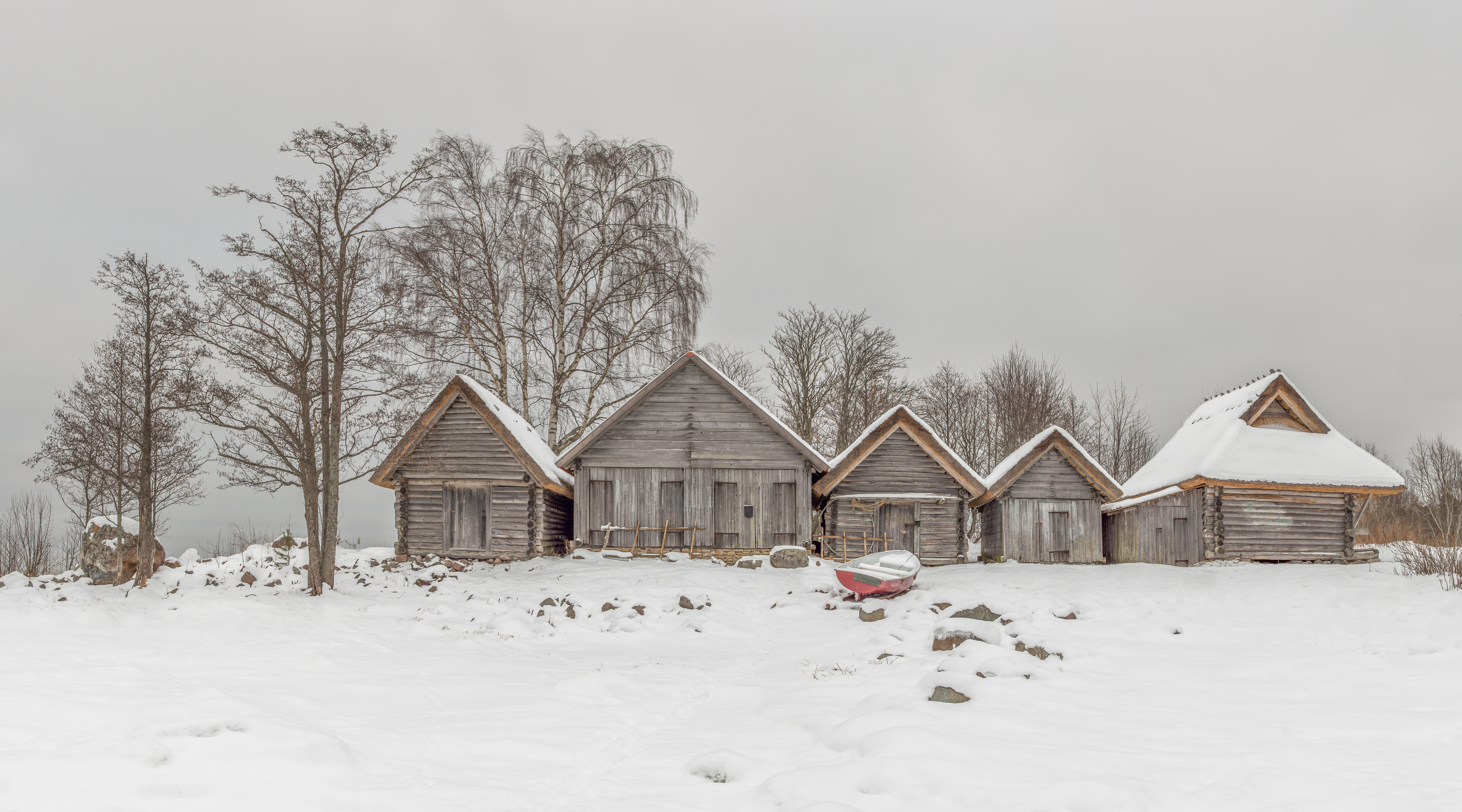
Fishermen cabins in Altja village, Lahemaa National Park

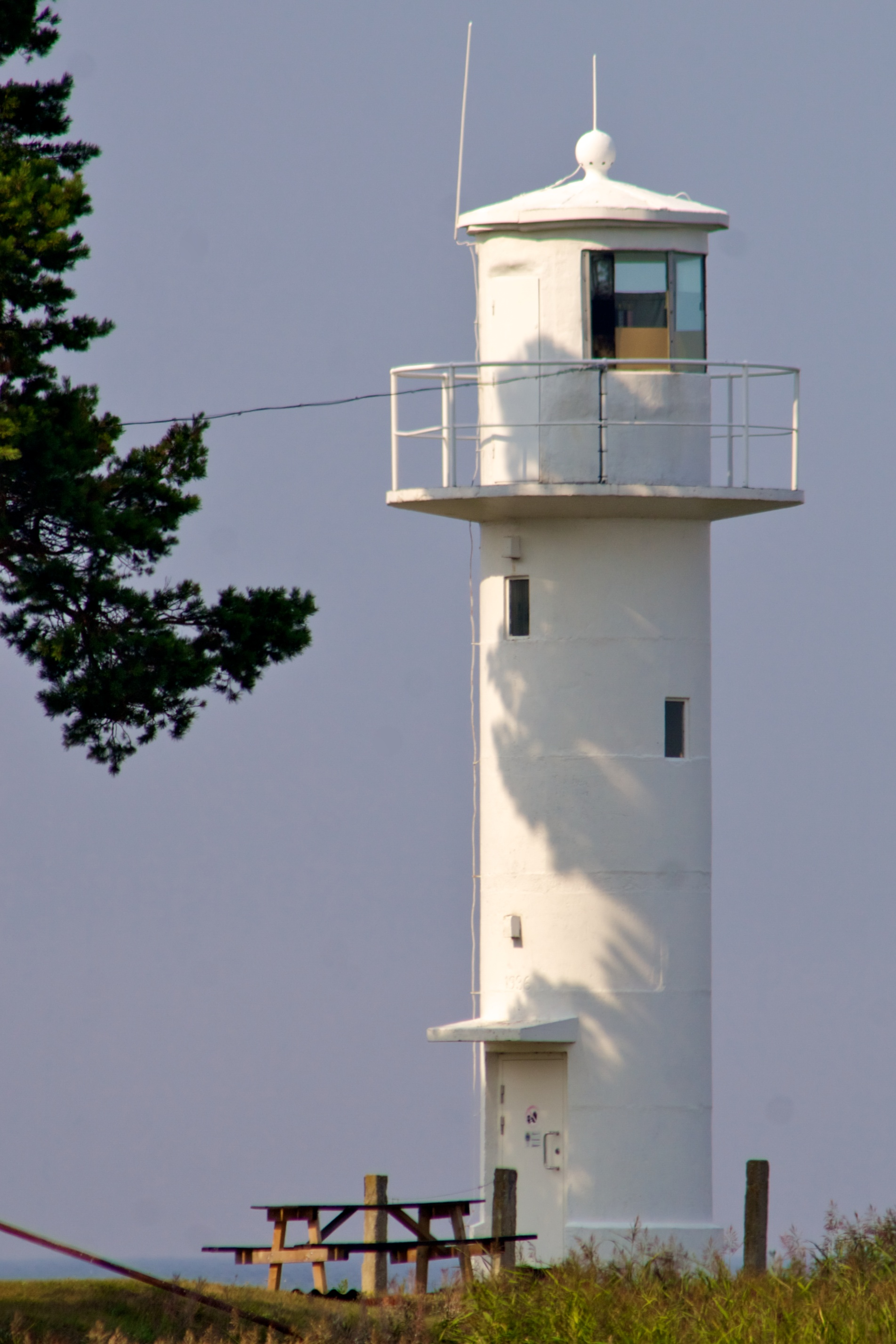
Vergi light beacon

== See also ==
- Rutja Airfield
