= Uusküla, Lääne-Viru County =

Village in Estonia

Coordinates: 59°30′N 25°51′E

Uusküla
- Village
- Interactive map of Uusküla
- Country: Estonia
- County: Lääne-Viru County
- Parish: Haljala Parish
- Time zone: UTC+2 (EET)
  - Summer (DST): UTC+3 (EEST)

Uusküla is a village in Haljala Parish, Lääne-Viru County, in northeastern Estonia.

== Name ==
Uusküla was attested in historical sources as Vdeskulle in the 15th century, Wuszküll in 1510, Vsküllby in 1583, and Udenküll in 1726. The name literally means 'new village'. Two lines of thought explain the "new" character of the settlement. The archaeologist Tanel Moora determined that the cemetery in Uusküla is more recent than the other cemeteries associated with Palmse Manor. The archaeologist Valter Lang, who found earlier traces of cremation burials in the area, assumes that there was a break in settlement, and that the name Uusküla was applied when the area was resettled.
