= Haili =

Haili may refer to:

== Common nouns ==
- Finnish-language word for Baltic herring, subspecies of Atlantic herring found in the Baltic Sea

== People ==
=== Given name ===
- Liu Haili (born 1984), Chinese heptathlete
- Zang Haili (born 1978), Chinese football coach and former player
- Zhang Haili (born 1979), Indonesian badminton player

=== Surname ===
- Clarissa Haili, American singer, dancer, actress, and comedian
- Darius Haili, Papua New Guinean rugby league footballer

== Places ==
- Haili, Estonia, village in Haljala Parish, Lääne-Viru County, Estonia
- Haili Church, Christian church building in Hilo, Hawaii, U.S.

== See also ==
- Qingdao Haili Helicopters, Chinese aircraft manufacturer
