= Noonu =

Noonu may refer to:

- Noonu, Estonia, a village in Haljala Parish, Lääne-Viru County, Estonia
- Noonu Atoll, an administrative division of the Maldives
- Noonu, a character of the Thaana script
