= Kisuvere =

Village in Estonia

Coordinates: 59°25′N 26°15′E

- Village
- Interactive map of Kisuvere
- Country: Estonia
- County: Lääne-Viru County
- Parish: Haljala Parish
- Time zone: UTC+2 (EET)
  - Summer (DST): UTC+3 (EEST)

Kisuvere is a village in Haljala Parish, Lääne-Viru County, in northeastern Estonia.
