= Vole (disambiguation) =

A vole is a small rodent in the subfamily Arvicolinae.

Vole may also refer to:

== Places ==
- Vole, Somerset, a village in England
- Võle, Estonia, a village

== Card playing ==
- Vole (cards), term for a slam in some card games
- Vole, a rule variation for Ombre, a card game

== Other ==
- Vole (magazine), a UK environmental magazine
- The Vole, a nickname for Microsoft originally coined by The Inquirer
- "Vole", a song by Celine Dion from her 1995 album D'eux
