= Võsu =

Borough in Estonia

- Small borough
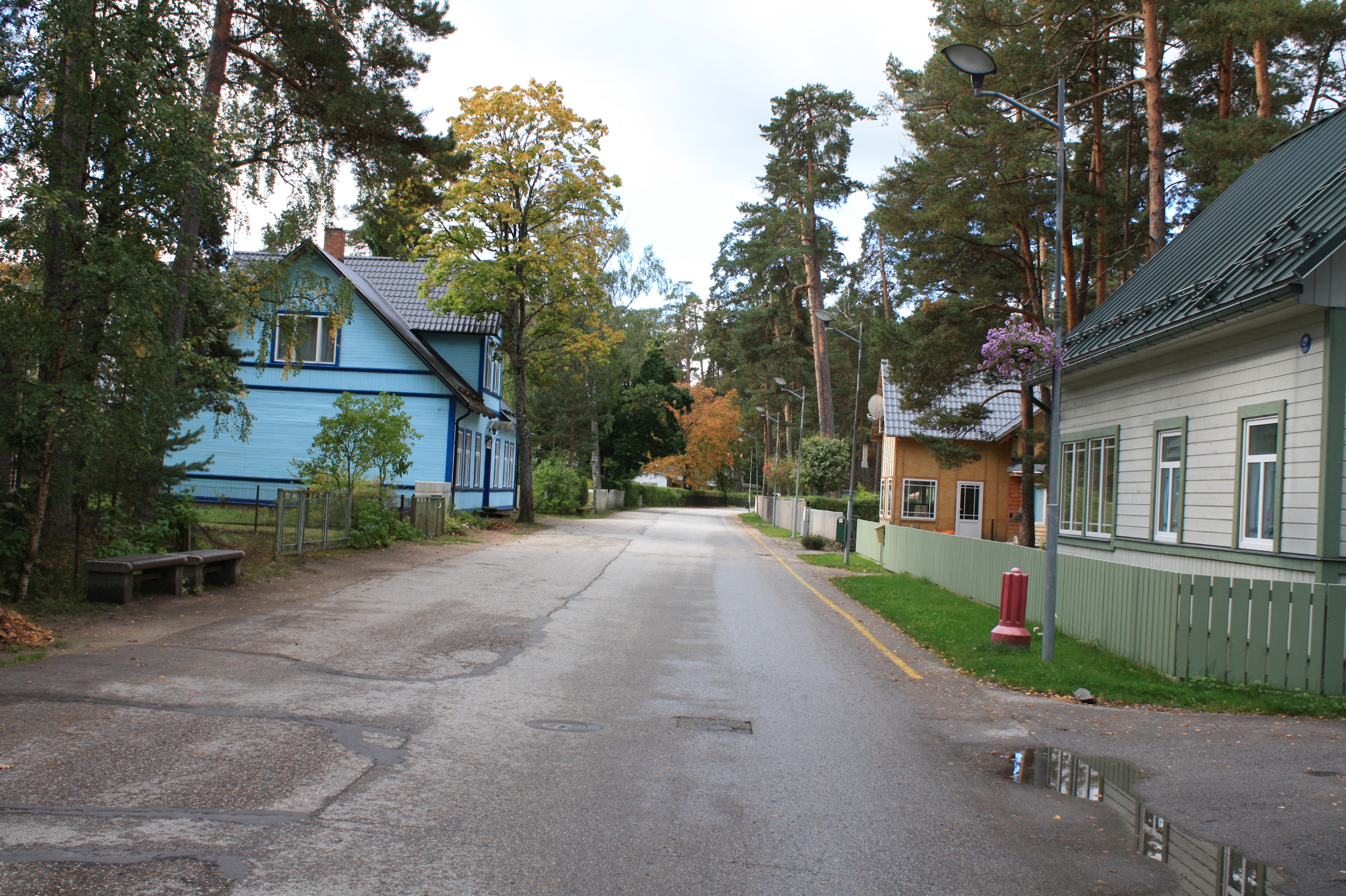
- Street in Võsu

- Location in Estonia
- Coordinates: 59°34′41″N 25°58′01″E
- Country: Estonia
- County: Lääne-Viru County
- Municipality: Haljala Parish

Population (2011 Census)
  - Total: 334

Võsu is a small borough (Estonian: alevik) in Lääne-Viru County, in Haljala Parish, in Estonia. It was the administrative centre of Vihula Parish. As of the 2011 census, the settlement's population was 334.

== Name ==
Võsu was attested in historical sources as Wöso in 1510, Wose in 1586, and Weso in 1726. The settlement was named after the Võsu River (attested in 1534 as Fassenbek and Wesenbeck), the name of which is derived from the noun võsa 'brushwood, brush, scrub'.

== History ==
From 1971 to 1999, Võsu was a borough (alev). From 1992 to 1999, it had the status of a municipality.
