= Võhma (disambiguation) =

Võhma may refer to several places in Estonia:

- Võhma, town in Põhja-Sakala Parish, Viljandi County
- Võhma, Ida-Viru County, village in Alutaguse Parish, Ida-Viru County
- Võhma, Haljala Parish, village in Haljala Parish, Lääne-Viru County
- Võhma, Rakvere Parish, village in Rakvere Parish, Lääne-Viru County
- Võhma, Pärnu County, village in Lääneranna Parish, Pärnu County
- Võhma, Saaremaa Parish, village in Saaremaa Parish, Saare County
- Väike-Võhma, village in Saaremaa Parish, Saare County, formerly known as Võhma
