= Annikvere =

Annikvere may refer to:

- Annikvere, Jõgeva County, village in Estonia
- Annikvere, Lääne-Viru County, village in Estonia
