= Villand =

Villand may refer to:

- Villand, hundred of Sweden. See List of hundreds of Sweden

== People with the surname ==
- Kiino Villand, American photographer

== See also ==
- Villandi, village in Estonia
