= Oandu =

Oandu may refer to:

- Oandu, Ida-Viru County, village in Lüganuse Parish, Ida-Viru County, Estonia
- Oandu, Lääne-Viru County, village in Haljala Parish, Lääne-Viru County, Estonia
