= Pedassaare =

Pedassaare may refer to several places in Estonia:

- Pedassaare, Jõgeva County, village in Estonia
- Pedassaare, Lääne-Viru County, village in Estonia
