= Tidriku =

Village in Estonia

Coordinates: 59°31′42″N 26°24′24″E

- Village
- Interactive map of Tidriku
- Country: Estonia
- County: Lääne-Viru County
- Parish: Haljala Parish

Population
  - Total: 0
- Time zone: UTC+2 (EET)
  - Summer (DST): UTC+3 (EEST)

Tidriku (also known as Tiidriki and Tiidrigi) is an uninhabited village in Haljala Parish, Lääne-Viru County, in northern Estonia.
