= Salatse =

Village in Estonia

Coordinates: 59°29′N 26°10′E

- Village
- Interactive map of Salatse
- Country: Estonia
- County: Lääne-Viru County
- Parish: Haljala Parish
- Time zone: UTC+2 (EET)
  - Summer (DST): UTC+3 (EEST)

Salatse is a village in Haljala Parish, Lääne-Viru County, in northeastern Estonia.
