= Sakussaare =

Village in Estonia

Coordinates: 59°28′N 26°00′E

- Village
- Interactive map of Sakussaare
- Country: Estonia
- County: Lääne-Viru County
- Parish: Haljala Parish
- Time zone: UTC+2 (EET)
  - Summer (DST): UTC+3 (EEST)

Sakussaare is a village in Haljala Parish, Lääne-Viru County, in northeastern Estonia. It is just south of Vosupere, with one main road through it the 176 which is a one way road.
