= Kiva, Estonia =

Village in Estonia

Coordinates: 59°32′N 26°17′E

Kiva
- Village
- Interactive map of Kiva
- Country: Estonia
- County: Lääne-Viru County
- Parish: Haljala Parish
- Time zone: UTC+2 (EET)
  - Summer (DST): UTC+3 (EEST)

Kiva is a village in Haljala Parish, Lääne-Viru County, in northeastern Estonia.

The southwestern part of the Rutja Airfield is located on the territory of Kiva.
