= Vergi =

Village in Estonia

- Village
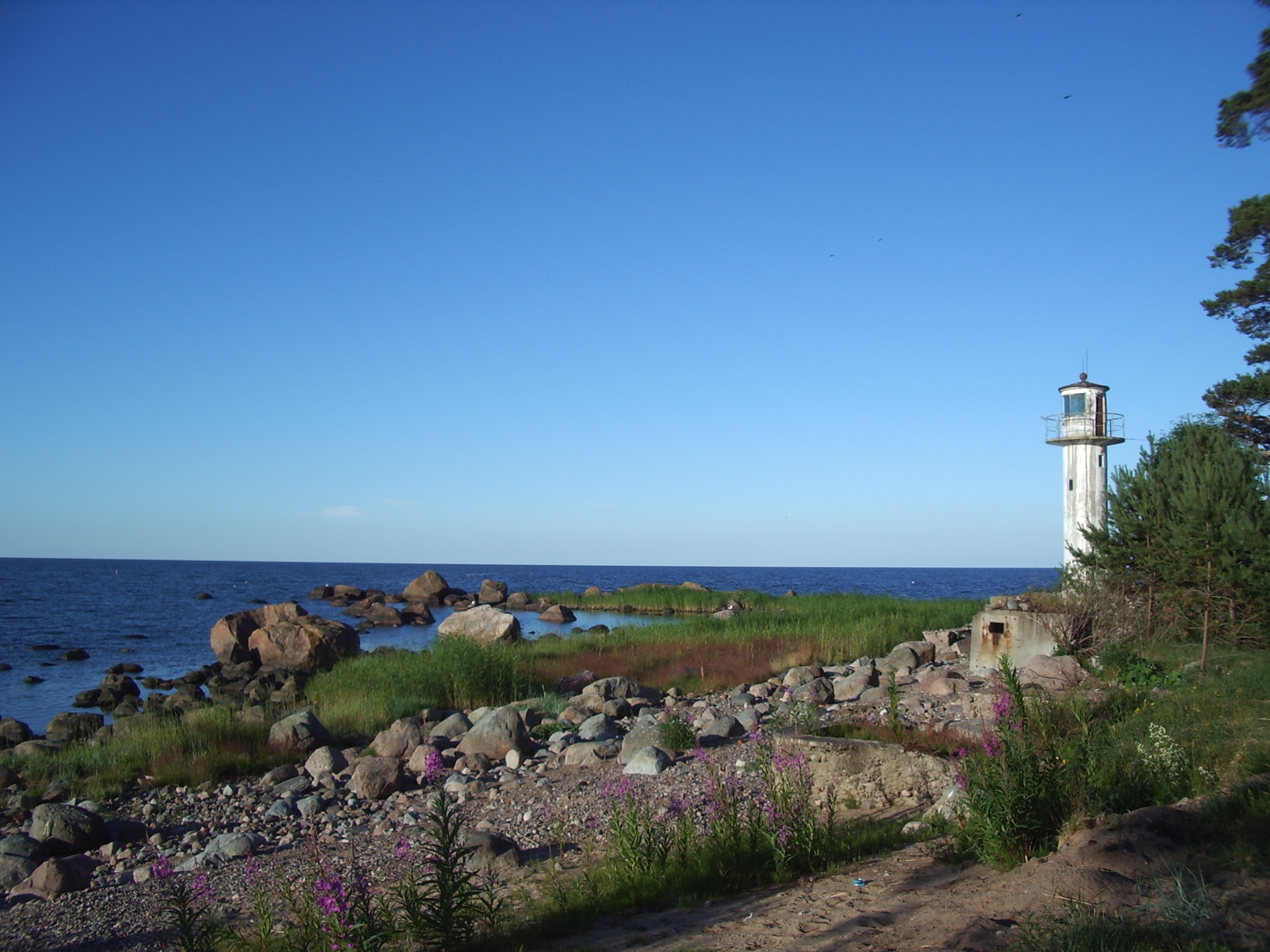
- Vergi lighthouse

- Location within Estonia
- Coordinates: 59°36′N 26°05′E
- Country: Estonia
- County: Lääne-Viru County
- Parish: Haljala Parish
- Time zone: UTC+2 (EET)
  - Summer (DST): UTC+3 (EEST)

Vergi(um) is also a town and former Catholic bishopric, now Berja, in southern Spain, now a Latin titular see

Vergi is a village in Haljala Parish, Lääne-Viru County, in northern Estonia, on the territory of Lahemaa National Park.

== Gallery ==
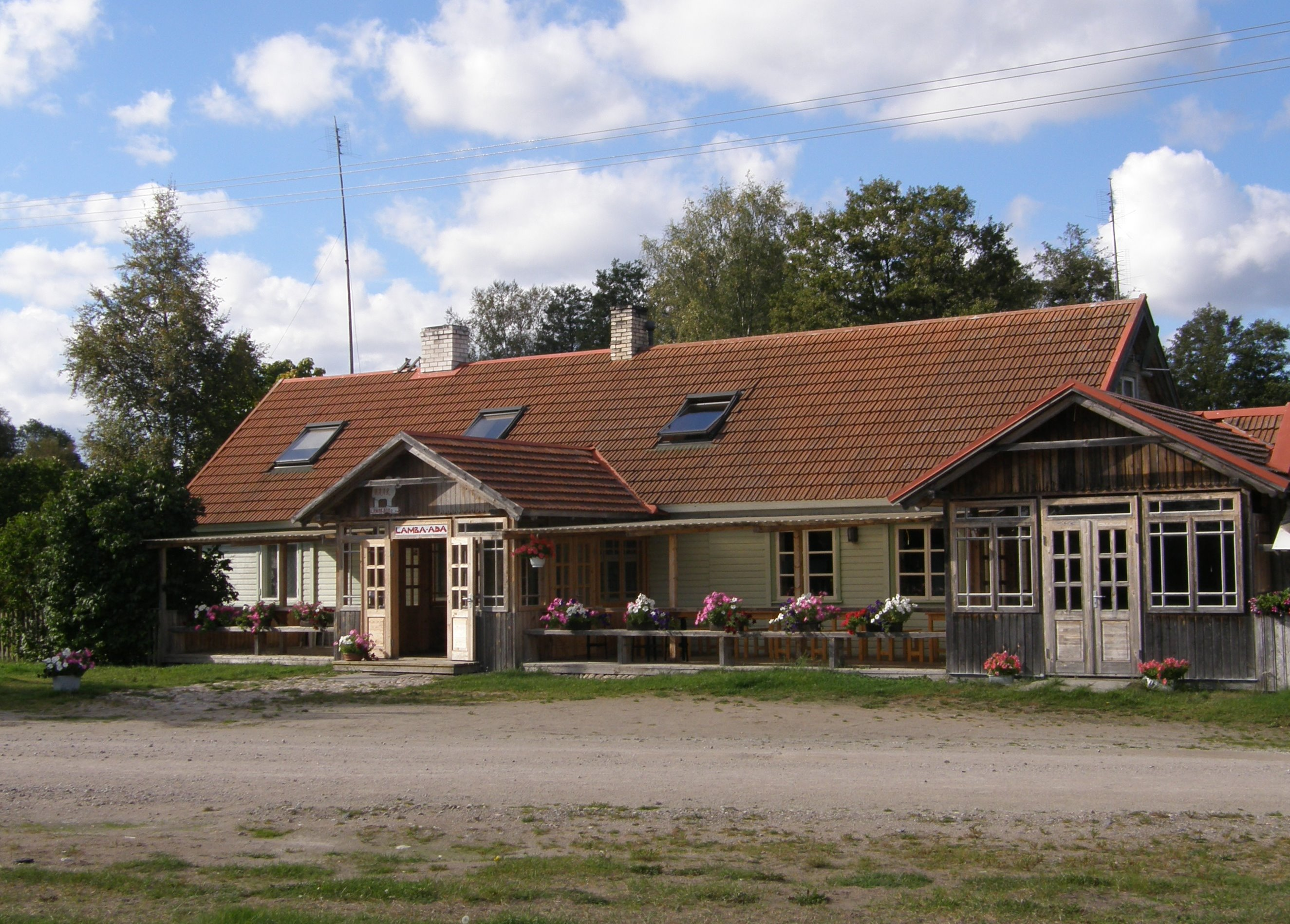
Lamba-Ada beach bar

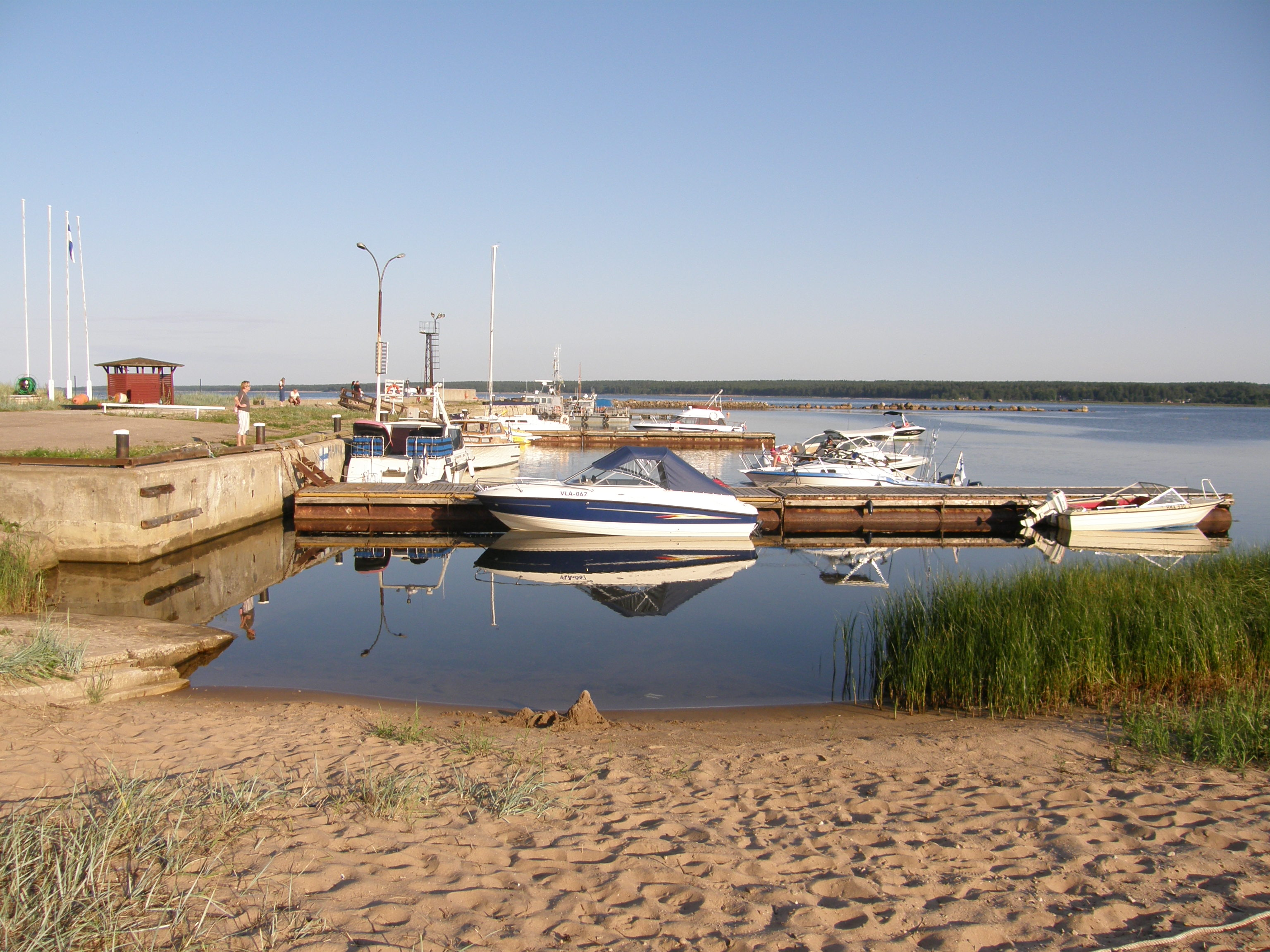
Vergi harbour

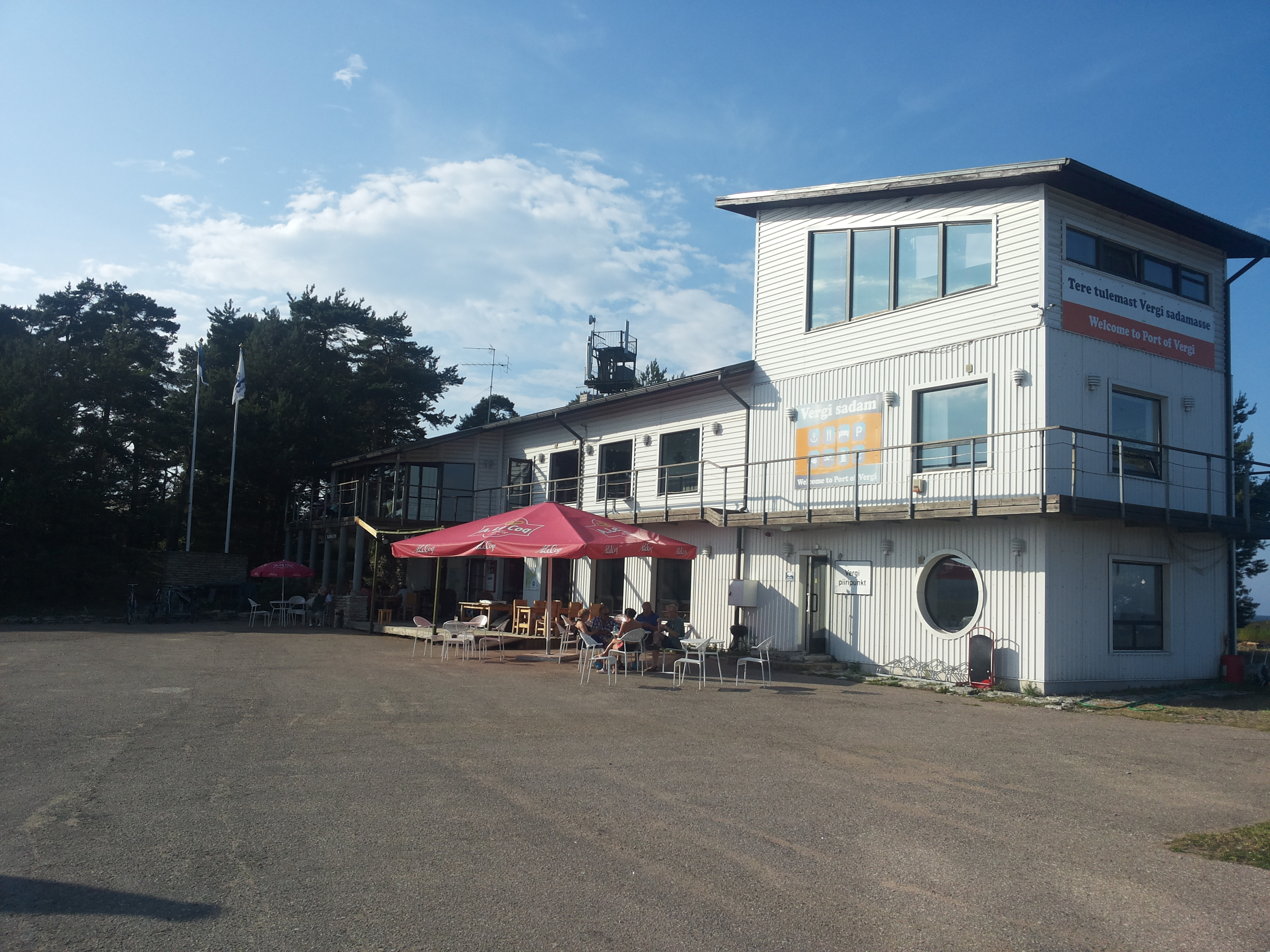
Harbour building

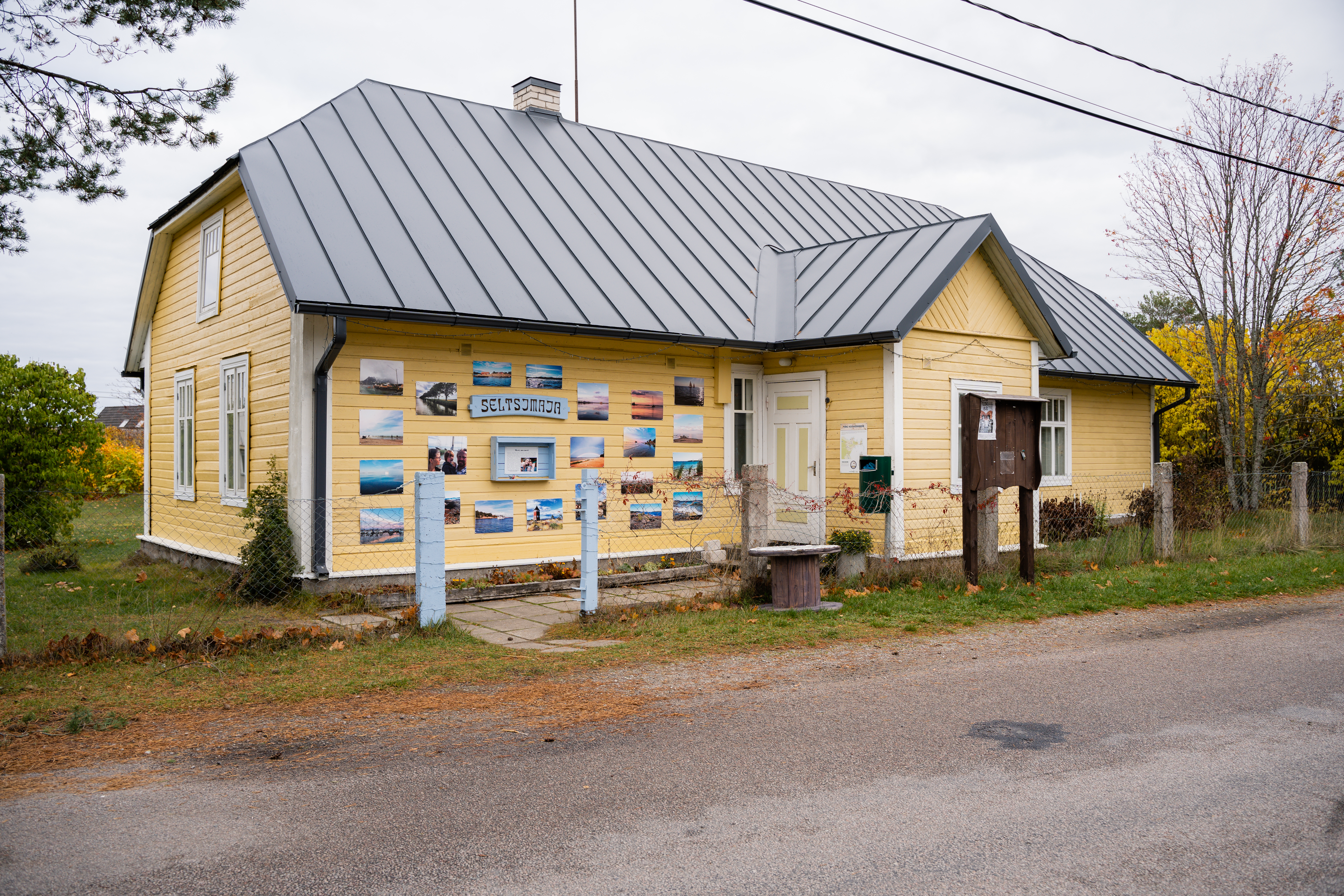
Library
