= Võsupere =

Village in Estonia

Coordinates: 59°30′N 25°58′E

- Village
- Interactive map of Võsupere
- Country: Estonia
- County: Lääne-Viru County
- Parish: Haljala Parish
- Time zone: UTC+2 (EET)
  - Summer (DST): UTC+3 (EEST)

Võsupere is a village in Haljala Parish, Lääne-Viru County, in northeastern Estonia. It is just north of Sakussaare. This village is primarily known for two industrial businesses operated there by Palmse Mehaanikakoda OÜ (PALMS) and Palmse Metall OÜ (Palmse Trailer).

== Weather ==
The weather in Võsupere has a very low UV risk, during the winter months the UV rating rarely exceeds 0.2 which is classed as very low.
