= Andi, Estonia =

Village in Estonia

Andi
- Village
- Location within Estonia
- Country: Estonia
- County: Lääne-Viru County
- Parish: Haljala Parish
- Time zone: UTC+2 (EET)
  - Summer (DST): UTC+3 (EEST)

Andi is a village in Haljala Parish, Lääne-Viru County, in northeastern Estonia.
