= Rutja =

Village in Estonia

- Village
- Location within Estonia
- Coordinates: 59°33′N 26°23′E
- Country: Estonia
- County: Lääne-Viru County
- Parish: Haljala Parish
- Time zone: UTC+2 (EET)
  - Summer (DST): UTC+3 (EEST)

Rutja is a village in Haljala Parish, Lääne-Viru County, northern Estonia. It is located on the coast of the Bay of Finland and on the western shore of the Selja River. It borders Karepa to the east.

Rutja has attractive beaches and (mainly pine) forests.

== Name ==
Rutja was attested in historical sources as Heuschlag zu Ruddy (as the name of a meadow) in 1498, Stranddörfern Ruddi u Sulli in 1652, Raudja in 1792, and Rudja in 1871. The Finnish linguist Lauri Kettunen suggested that the name comes from ruttaja 'one who hurries'. In Finnish, hydronyms beginning with Ruta- derived from the dialect word ruta 'mud, slime resulting from plant decomposition', which according to the Finnish onomastician Sirkka Paikkala may have referred to the muddiness of the shore; this could also be the origin of the name of the coastal village of Rutja.

== History ==
Rutja Airfield, a disused Soviet military airfield, is located in Rutja. It was home to the 66th Soviet Attack Air Regiment, which flew as many as 45 Su-17 aircraft.

In 2022, exercises for Operation Saber Strike were held in Rutja.

== See also ==
- Järvoja
