= Koolimäe =

Village in Estonia

Coordinates: 59°37′N 26°01′E

- Village
- Interactive map of Koolimäe
- Country: Estonia
- County: Lääne-Viru County
- Parish: Haljala Parish
- Time zone: UTC+2 (EET)
  - Summer (DST): UTC+3 (EEST)

Koolimäe is a village in Haljala Parish, Lääne-Viru County, in northeastern Estonia.
