= Natturi =

Village in Estonia

Coordinates: 59°37′N 26°02′E

- Village
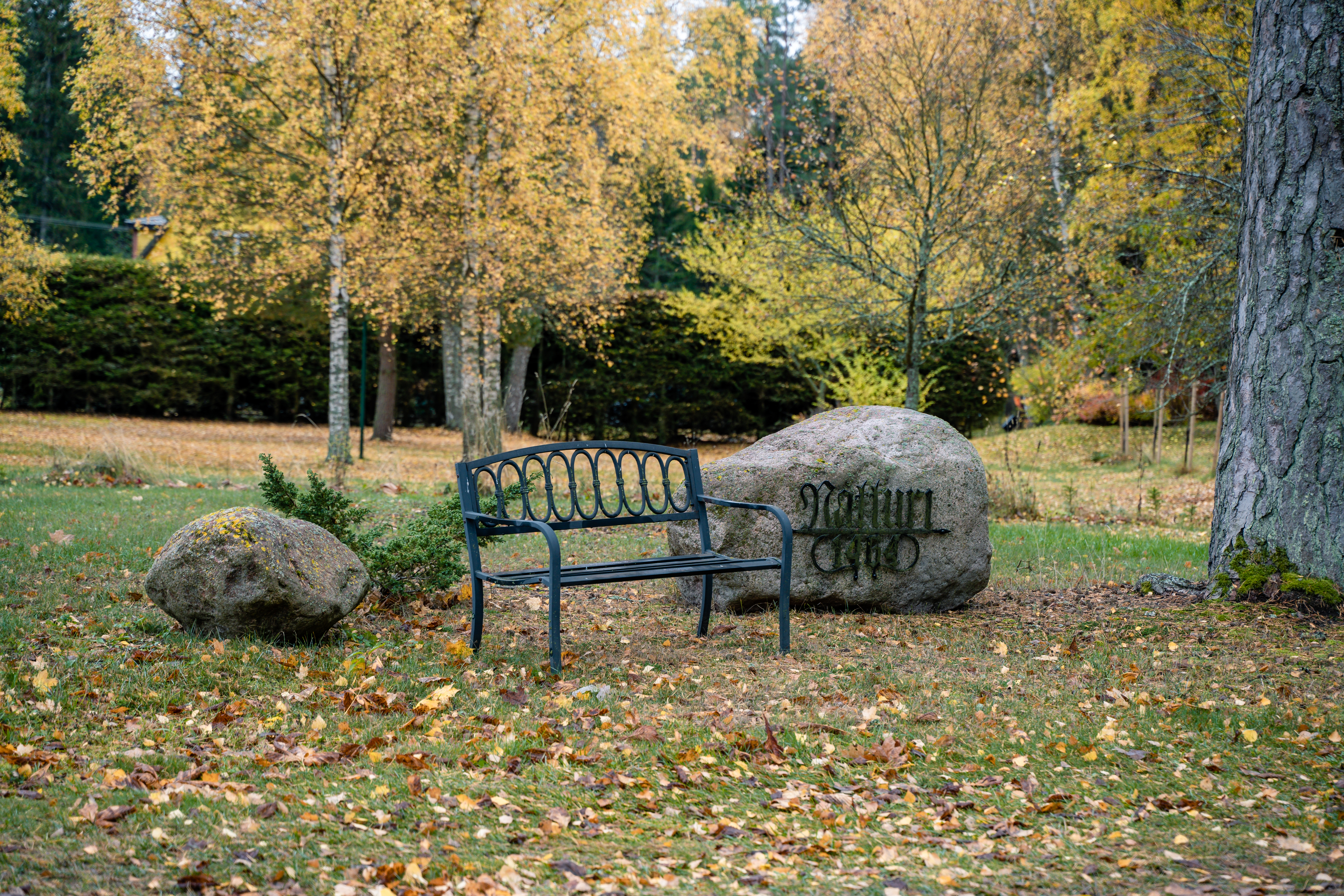
- Interactive map of Natturi
- Country: Estonia
- County: Lääne-Viru County
- Parish: Haljala Parish
- Time zone: UTC+2 (EET)
  - Summer (DST): UTC+3 (EEST)

Natturi is a village in Haljala Parish, Lääne-Viru County, in northeastern Estonia.

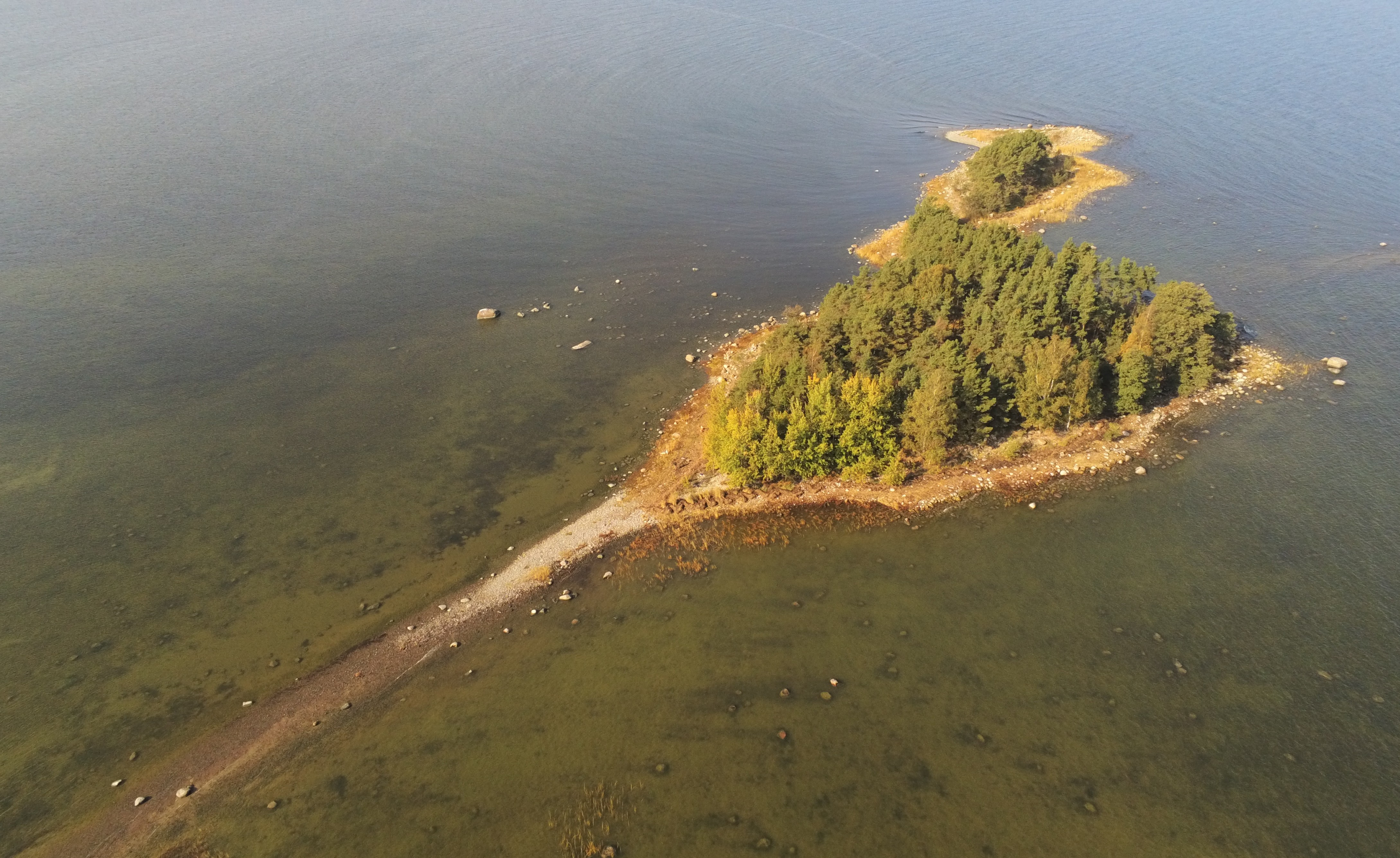
Älvi island

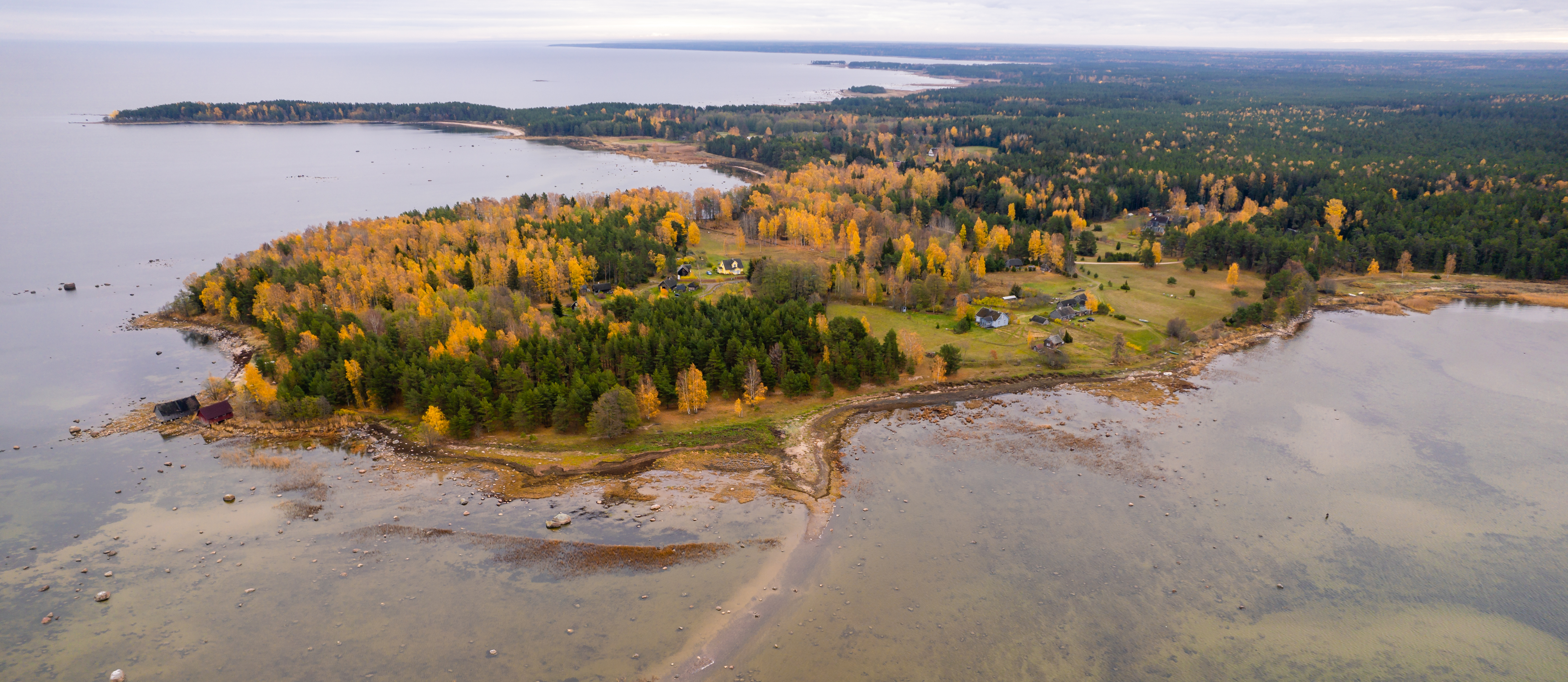
Natturi cape

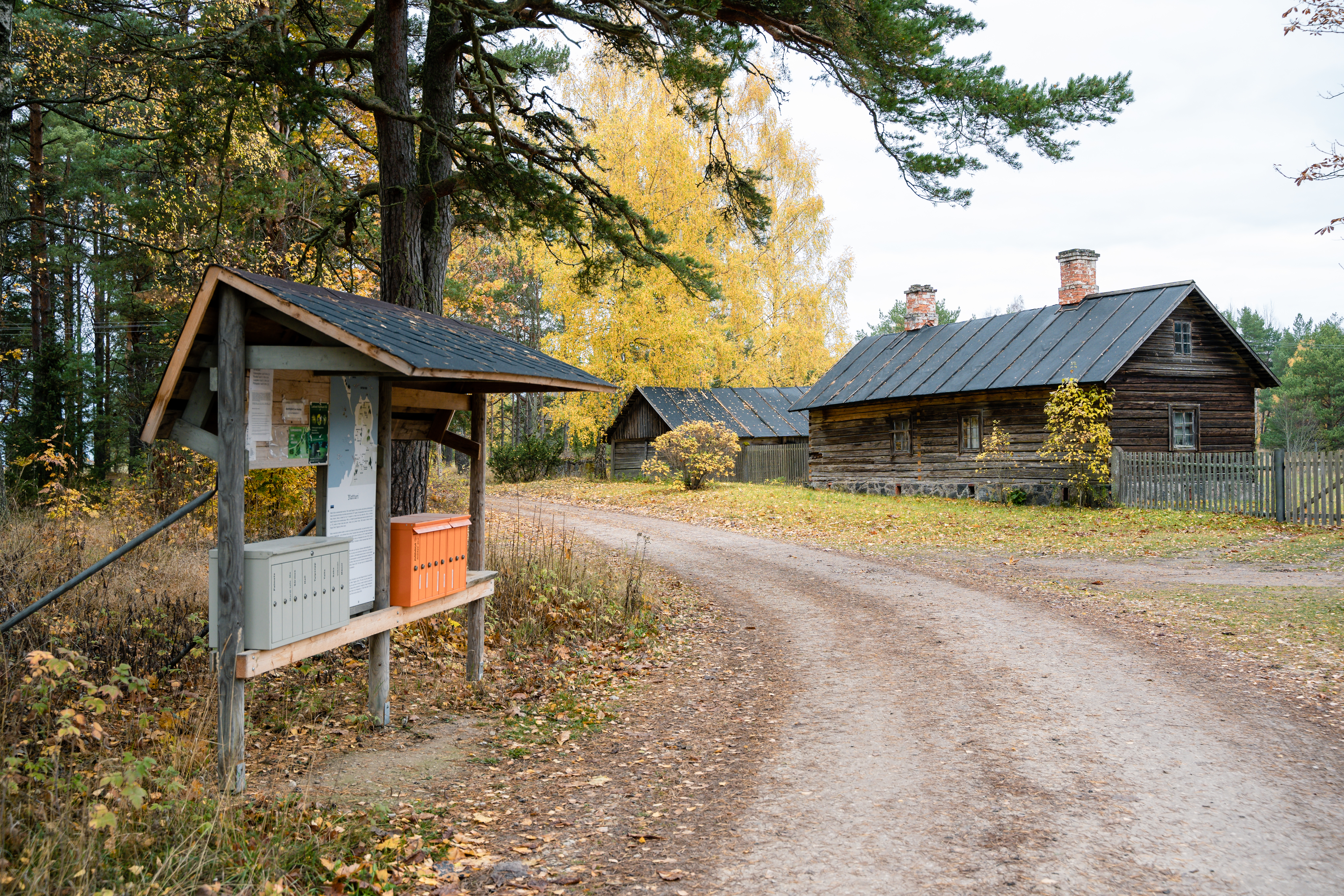
Village road
