= Aasumetsa =

Village in Estonia

Coordinates: 59°30′N 25°50′E

- Village
- Interactive map of Aasumetsa
- Country: Estonia
- County: Lääne-Viru County
- Parish: Haljala Parish
- Time zone: UTC+2 (EET)
  - Summer (DST): UTC+3 (EEST)

Aasumetsa is a village in Haljala Parish, Lääne-Viru County, in northeastern Estonia. It lies on the right bank of the Loobu River.

== Name ==
The name Aasumetsa is a compound of aasu, referring to a bend in a river or a meadow in such a bend, and mets (genitive metsa) 'forest'. The first part of the name comes from the name of a scattered farm. The village is located on a bend in Loobu River where a meadow meets the forest.
