= Pihlaspea =

Village in Estonia

Coordinates: 59°36′N 26°04′E

- Village
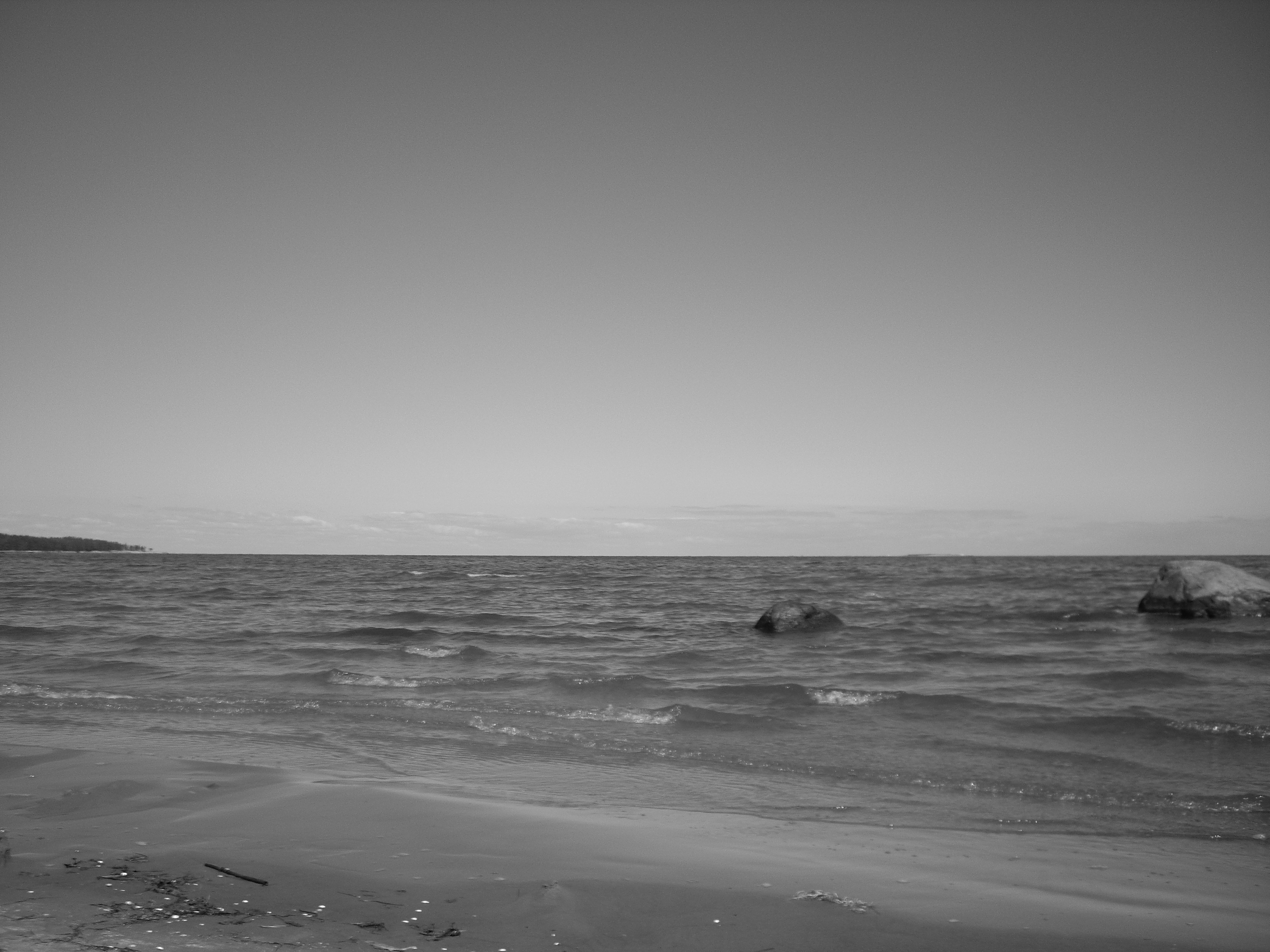
- Beach in Pihlaspea
- Interactive map of Pihlaspea
- Country: Estonia
- County: Lääne-Viru County
- Parish: Haljala Parish
- Time zone: UTC+2 (EET)
  - Summer (DST): UTC+3 (EEST)

Pihlaspea is a village in Haljala Parish, Lääne-Viru County, in northern Estonia.

A cemetery is located in the village. Historically it was next to a chapel which was built in 1673 but demolished in 1845.
