= Pedassaare, Lääne-Viru County =

Village in Estonia

Coordinates: 59°37′14″N 26°02′17″E

Pedassaare
- Village
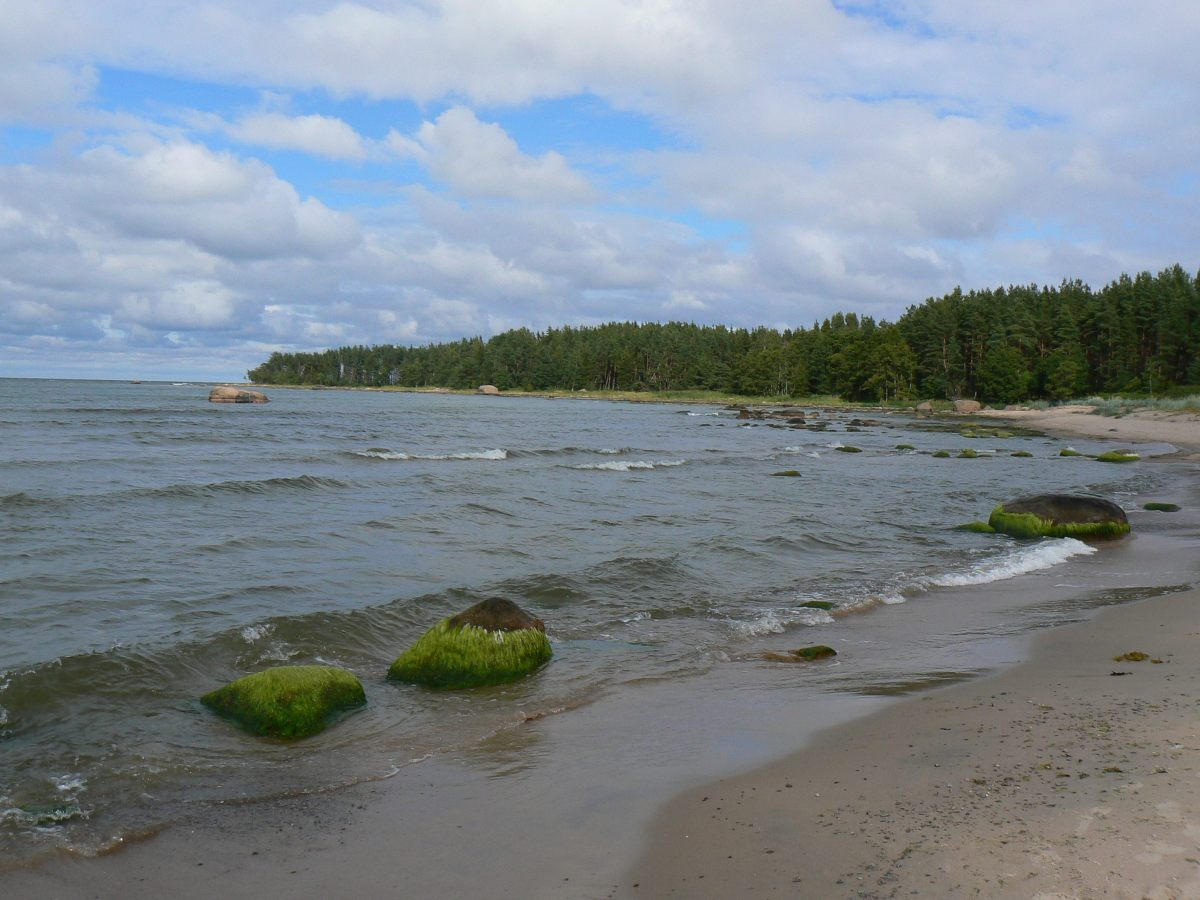
- Pedassaare Cape
- Interactive map of Pedassaare
- Country: Estonia
- County: Lääne-Viru County
- Parish: Haljala Parish
- Time zone: UTC+2 (EET)
  - Summer (DST): UTC+3 (EEST)

Pedassaare is a village in Haljala Parish, Lääne-Viru County, in northern Estonia, on the territory of Lahemaa National Park.
