= Palmse =

Village in Estonia

Coordinates: 59°31′N 25°57′E

- Village
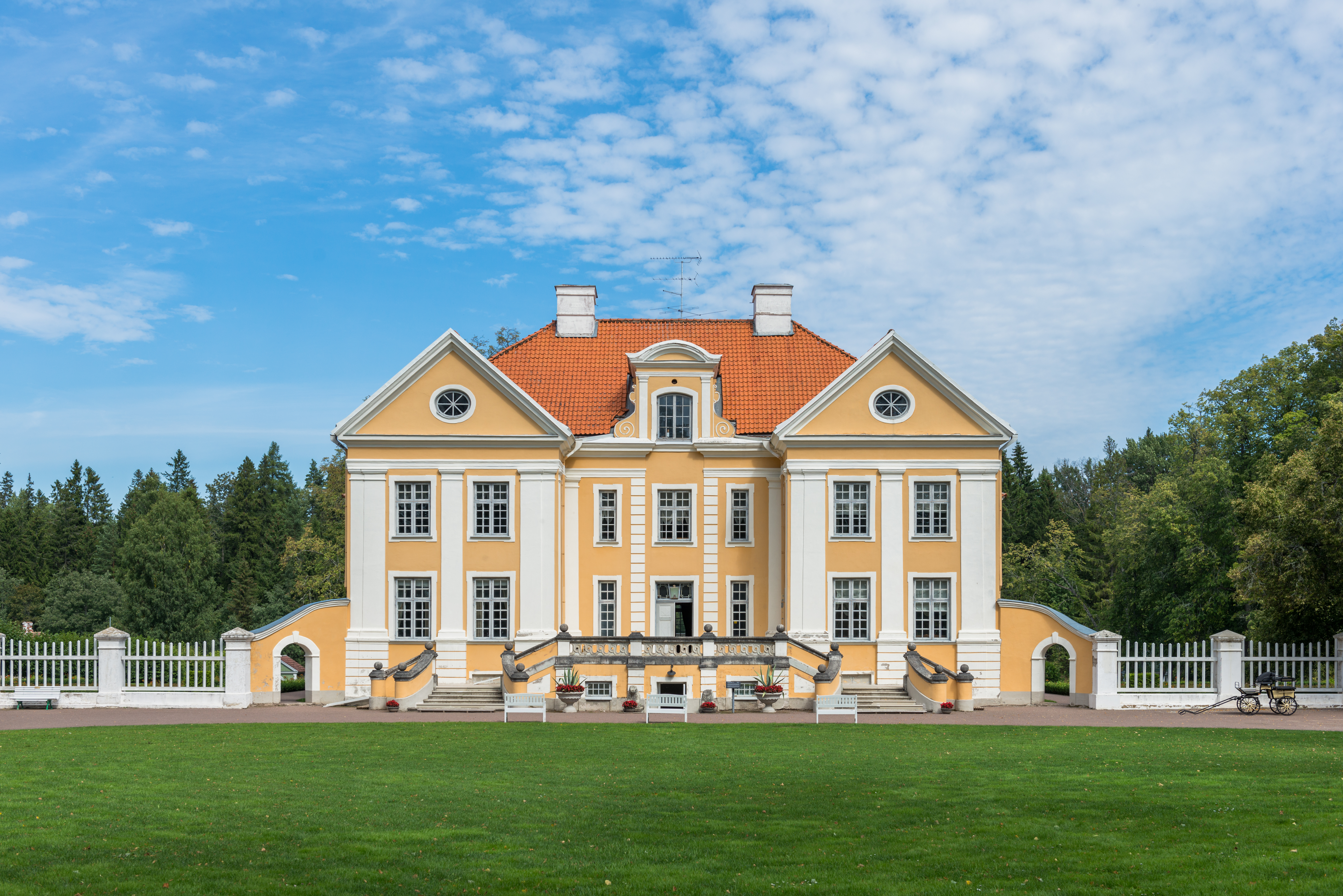
- Palmse Manor
- Interactive map of Palmse
- Country: Estonia
- County: Lääne-Viru County
- Parish: Haljala Parish
- Time zone: UTC+2 (EET)
  - Summer (DST): UTC+3 (EEST)

Palmse is a village in Haljala Parish, Lääne-Viru County, in northern Estonia, on the territory of Lahemaa National Park.

== Palmse manor ==
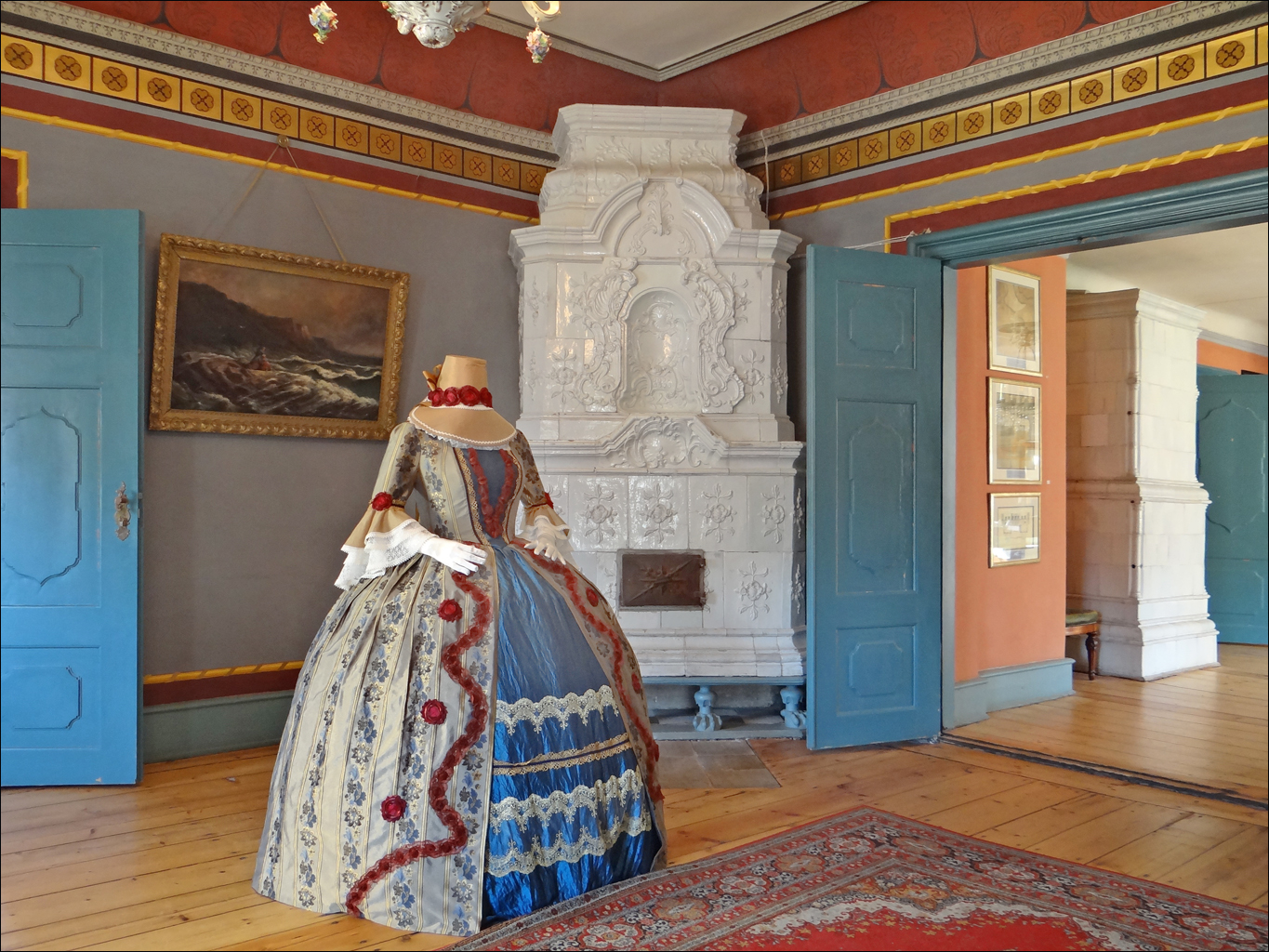
Palmse manor, interior

Palmse estate (German: Palms) belonged to the convent of St. Michael in Tallinn in the Middle Ages and is referred to as a manorial estate in 1510. From 1676 until the Estonian declaration of independence in 1919 it belonged to the Baltic German von der Pahlen family. Construction of the present building started under the ownership of Gustav Christian von der Pahlen in 1697, by designs of architect Jacob Staël von Holstein. The house was burnt during the Great Northern War and restored in 1730 by Arend Dietrich von der Pahlen, who had studied architecture in the Netherlands. The house was given its present-day look during a renovation in 1782-1785, under the guidance of architect Johann Caspar Mohr, who designed a number of manor houses in Estonia as well as the present-day seat of Government of Estonia, the Stenbock House in Tallinn.

Apart from the stately manor house, there are also several preserved outbuildings on the grounds, such as a distillery, greenhouse and barn, as well as a great park with typical romantic pavilions and a bath-house.

An extensive renovation scheme of the manor house ensemble was carried out in 1973-1986. The interiors of the main house have also been re-furnished with furniture typical for a manorial estate in the 19th century (although only one piece is actually originally from the estate).

Russian military officer and statesman Peter Ludwig von der Pahlen (1745–1826) was born in Palmse Manor.

The manor is today situated in the Lahemaa National Park.

== See also ==
- Lahemaa National Park
- List of palaces and manor houses in Estonia
