= Võhma, Haljala Parish =

Village in Estonia

Coordinates: 59°32′N 25°52′E

Võhma
- Village
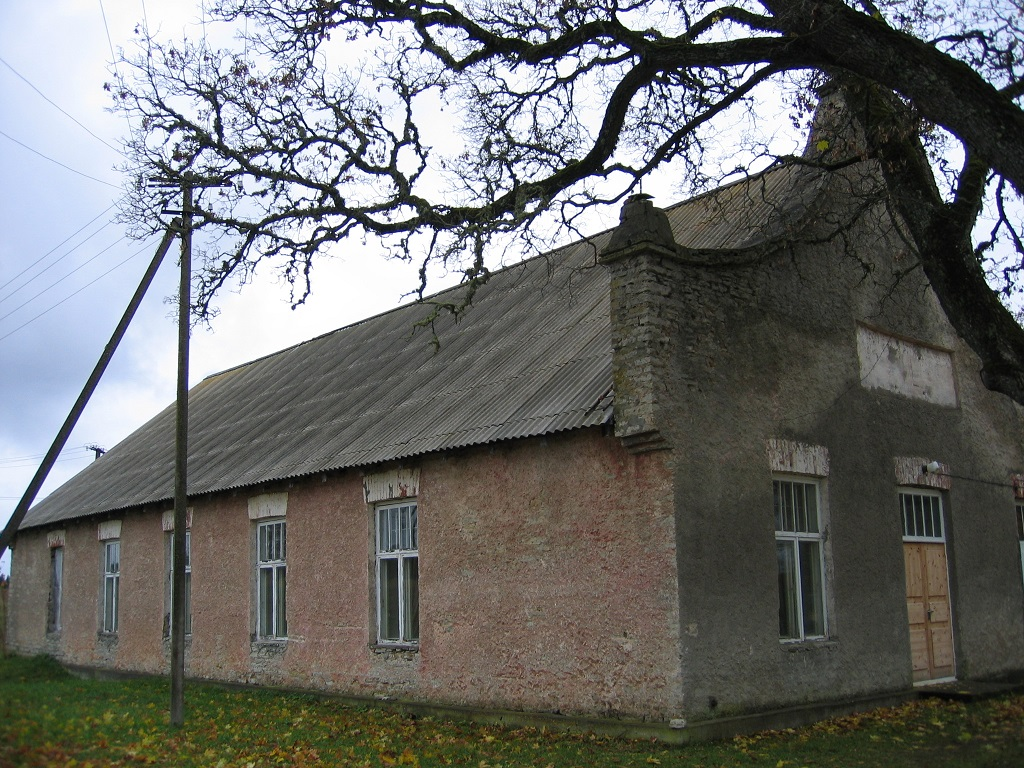
- Võhma society house in 2004 (before renovation)
- Interactive map of Võhma
- Country: Estonia
- County: Lääne-Viru County
- Parish: Haljala Parish
- Time zone: UTC+2 (EET)
  - Summer (DST): UTC+3 (EEST)

Võhma is a village in Haljala Parish, Lääne-Viru County, in northeastern Estonia.
