= Oandu, Lääne-Viru County =

Village in Estonia

Coordinates: 59°33′55″N 26°06′11″E

Oandu
- Village
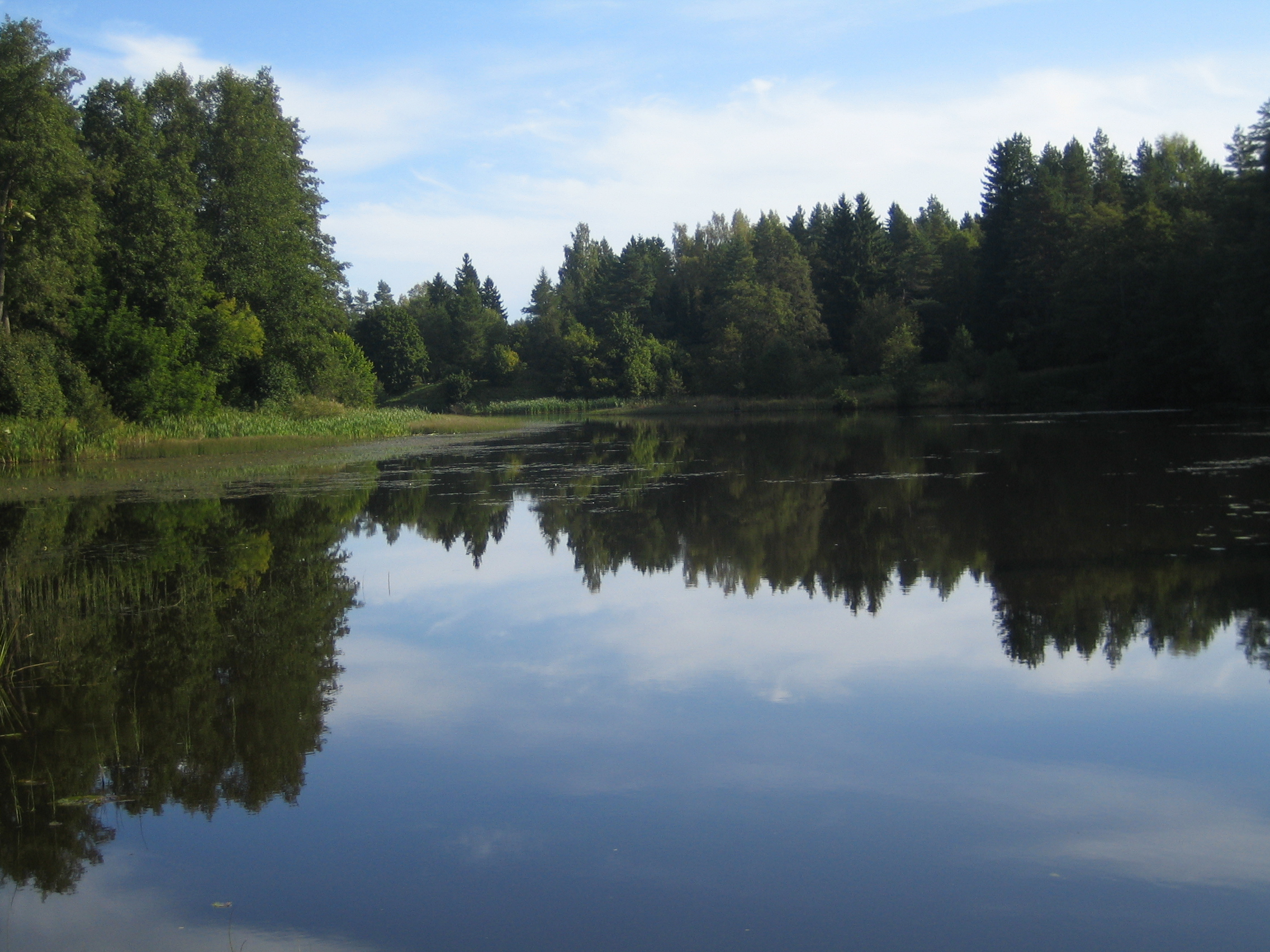
- Oandu Lake
- Interactive map of Oandu
- Country: Estonia
- County: Lääne-Viru County
- Parish: Haljala Parish
- Time zone: UTC+2 (EET)
  - Summer (DST): UTC+3 (EEST)

Oandu is a village in Haljala Parish, Lääne-Viru County, in northern Estonia, on the territory of Lahemaa National Park.
