= Annikvere, Lääne-Viru County =

Village in Estonia

Annikvere
- Village
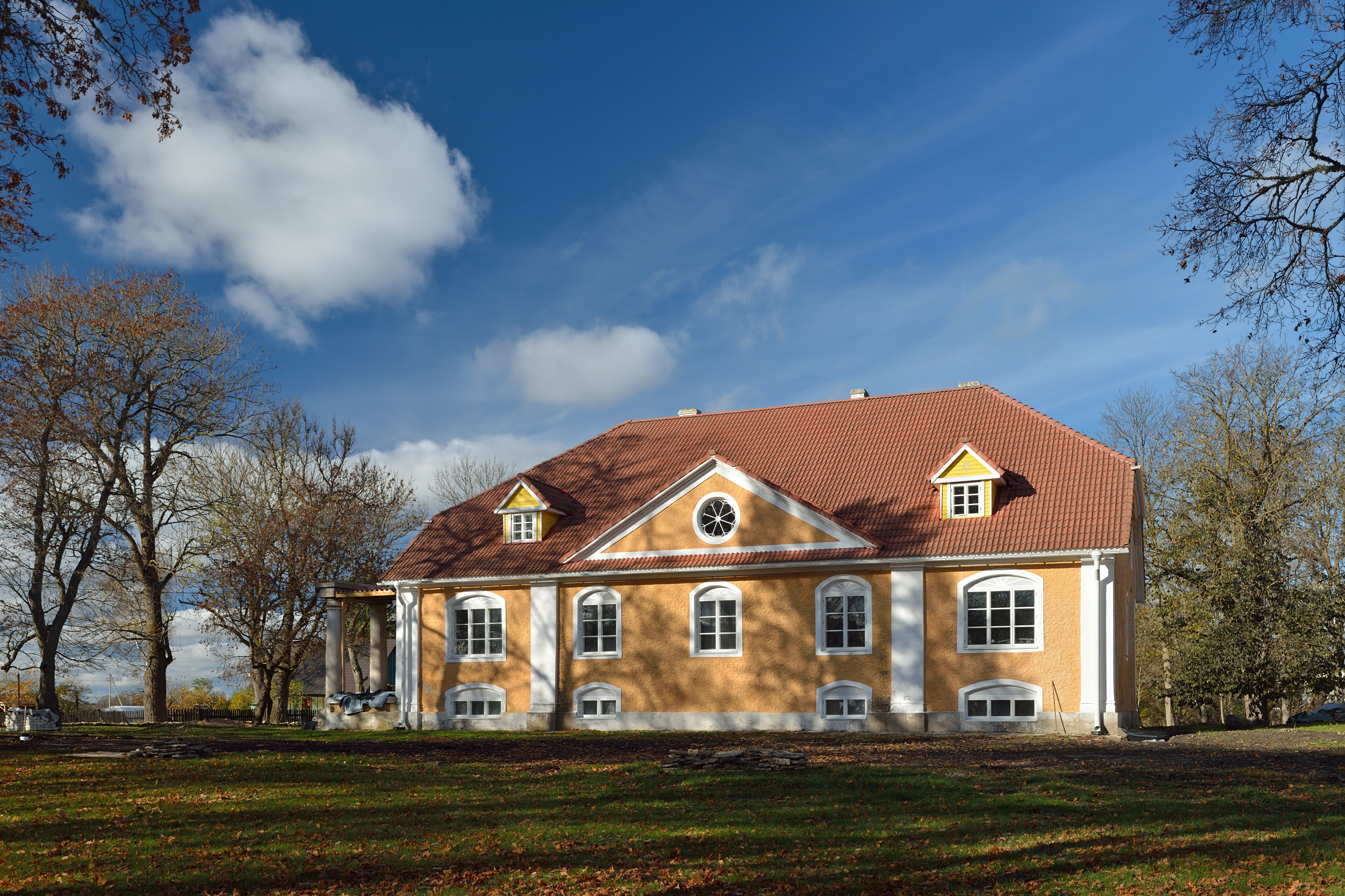
- Annikvere manor

- Location within Estonia
- Coordinates: 59°29′11″N 26°11′03″E
- Country: Estonia
- County: Lääne-Viru County
- Parish: Haljala Parish
- Time zone: UTC+2 (EET)
  - Summer (DST): UTC+3 (EEST)

Annikvere is a village in Haljala Parish, Lääne-Viru County, in northeastern Estonia.

Annikvere Manor (Annigfer) was first mentioned in 1445.
