= Rutja Airfield =

Airfield in Estonia

Rutja Airfield Rutja lennuväli
- IATA: none; ICAO: none

Summary
- Airport type: ~~Military~~
- Operator: ~~Soviet Air Defence Forces~~
- Location: Rutja, Kiva
- Elevation AMSL: 135 ft / 41 m
- Coordinates: 59°32′12″N 026°18′42″E

Map
- Location in Estonia

Runways
Direction	Length		Surface
Direction	m	ft	Surface
~~05/23~~	~~2,500~~	~~8,202~~	~~Concrete~~
- Sources: Forgotten Airports

Rutja Airfield (Estonian: Rutja lennuväli), also known as Kunda Airfield, is a disused airfield in Estonia, located 13 km (8.1 mi) west of Kunda in the territory of the villages of Rutja and Kiva. During the Soviet era, it was the reserve airfield of the 656th Fighter Aviation Regiment, stationed at Tapa Air Base.
