= Haljala Parish =

Municipality of Estonia (2017)

Coordinates: 59°25′01″N 26°15′41″E

Haljala Parish Haljala vald
- Municipality of Estonia
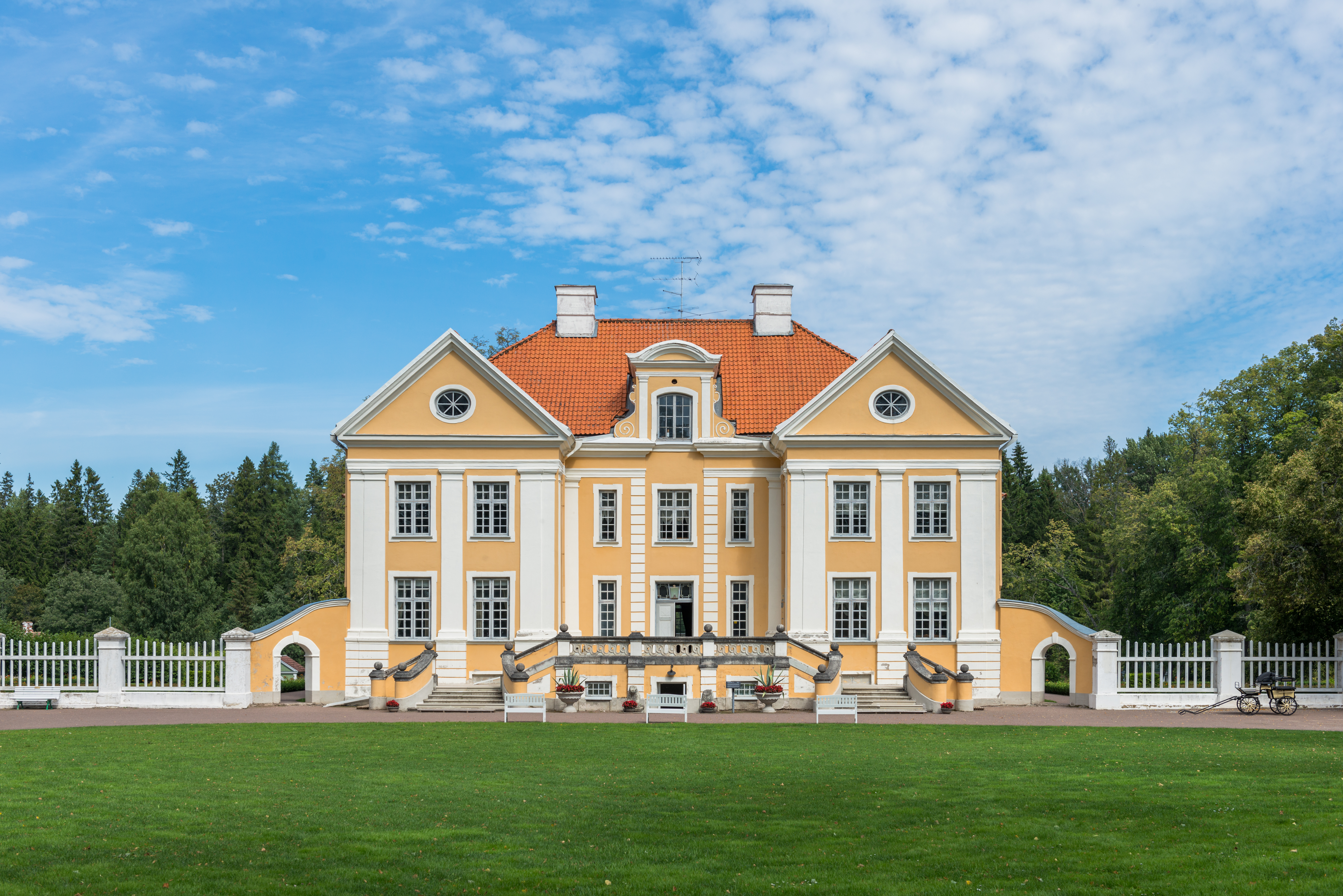
- Palmse manor house

- Flag Coat of arms

- Haljala Parish within Lääne-Viru County
- Country: Estonia
- County: Lääne-Viru County
- Administrative centre: Haljala

Area
  - Total: 549 km^{2} (212 sq mi)

Population (2021)
  - Total: 4,297
  - Density: 7.83/km^{2} (20.3/sq mi)
- ISO 3166 code: EE-191
- Website: www.haljala.ee

Haljala Parish (Estonian: Haljala vald) is a rural municipality of Estonia, in Lääne-Viru County. The municipality got its current borders following the 2017 administrative reform when Vihula municipality was merged with Haljala municipality.

== Demographics ==
As of 1 January 2026, the parish had 3,909 residents, of which 1,929 (49.3%) were women and 1,980 (50.7%) were men.

There are two small boroughs (Haljala and Võsu) and 72 villages in the municipality.

=== Religion ===
The majority of the older than fifteen years residents of Haljala parish, 86.9% are religiously unaffiliated. Among those residents who do associate with a religion, 8.5% identify as Lutheran while other Christian denominations make up 1.1% of the population. 3.5% of the population follows other religions or did not specify their religious affiliation.

== Notable people ==
Notable people who were born or lived in Haljala Parish include the following:

- Peter Ludwig von der Pahlen (1745 in Haljala Parish – 1826) was a Russian, Baltic German courtier
- Samuil Galberg (1787 in Haljala Parish – 1839), a Baltic German sculptor, many of his works are busts.
- Konstantin Osvet (1889–1946), journalist and caricaturist, born in Kärmu or Vanamõisa
- Julius Mark (1890 in Idavere – 1959), linguist and vice-president of the Estonian Academy of Sciences, 1938/1940
- Alexander Nelke (1894 in Vihula – 1974), artist, primarily of marine and landscapes and square rigged sailing vessels.
- Nigol Andresen (1899 in Haljala Parish – 1985), politician, writer, literary critic and translator.
- Boris Nelke (1899 in Vihula – 1972), sea captain, he helped many conscripts revolt aboard the SS Eestirand and flee to safety.
- Bernhard Saarsoo (1899 in Aaspere – 1964), physician and botanist.
- Richard Sagrits (1910 in Karepa – 1968), painter of the ceiling of the Estonian National Opera in the style of Socialist Realism
- Enn Tarvel (1932 in Metsiku – 2021), historian who researched political, agrarian and local history.

== International relations ==
=== Twin towns — sister cities ===
Haljala Parish is twinned with:

- Dorotea Municipality, Sweden
- Pyhtää Municipality, Finland
- Schönberg, Germany
