= Vihasoo =

Village in Estonia

Coordinates: 59°34′N 25°48′E

- Village
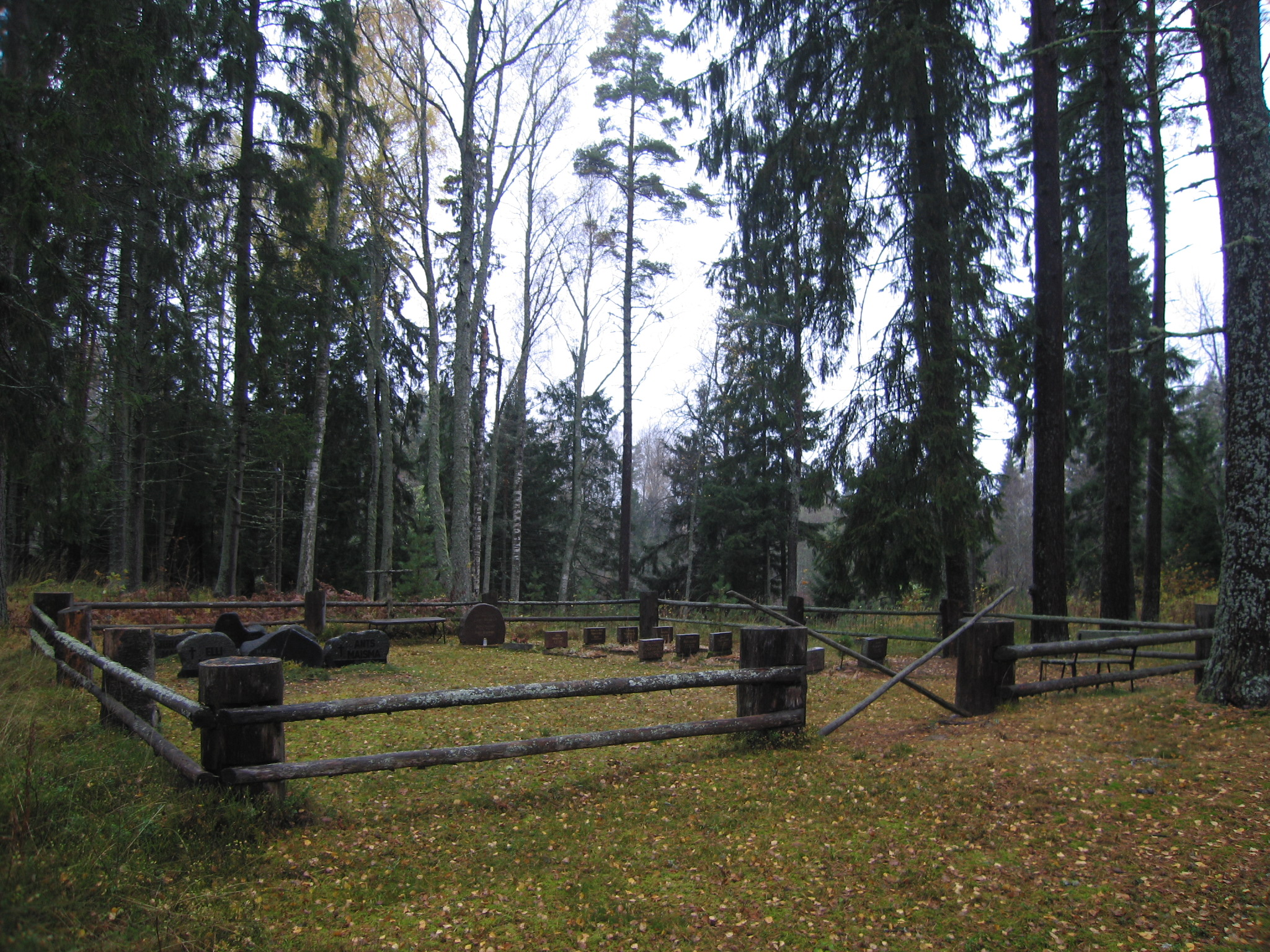
- Pauna talu kalmistu
- Interactive map of Vihasoo
- Country: Estonia
- County: Harju County
- Parish: Kuusalu Parish
- Time zone: UTC+2 (EET)
  - Summer (DST): UTC+3 (EEST)

Vihasoo is a village in Kuusalu Parish, Harju County in northern Estonia, on the territory of Lahemaa National Park. It is situated around the mouth of the Loobu River to the Eru Bay (part of the Gulf of Finland).
