= Ohepalu Nature Reserve =

Protected area in Estonia

- Location within Estonia
- Location: Estonia
- Coordinates: 59°21′N 25°55′E
- Area: 5,935 ha (14,670 acres)
- Established: 1973 (2014)

Aerial view of Ohepalu bog and its lake Suurjärv

Ohepalu Nature Reserve is a nature reserve which is located in Lääne-Viru County, Estonia.

The area of the nature reserve is 5935 ha.

The protected area was founded in 1973 on the basis of the southern part of Lahemaa National Park and on the basis of orchids' conservation area in Tapa (Estonian: Tapa piirkonna käpaliste kaitseala) (founded in 1993).

== Gallery ==
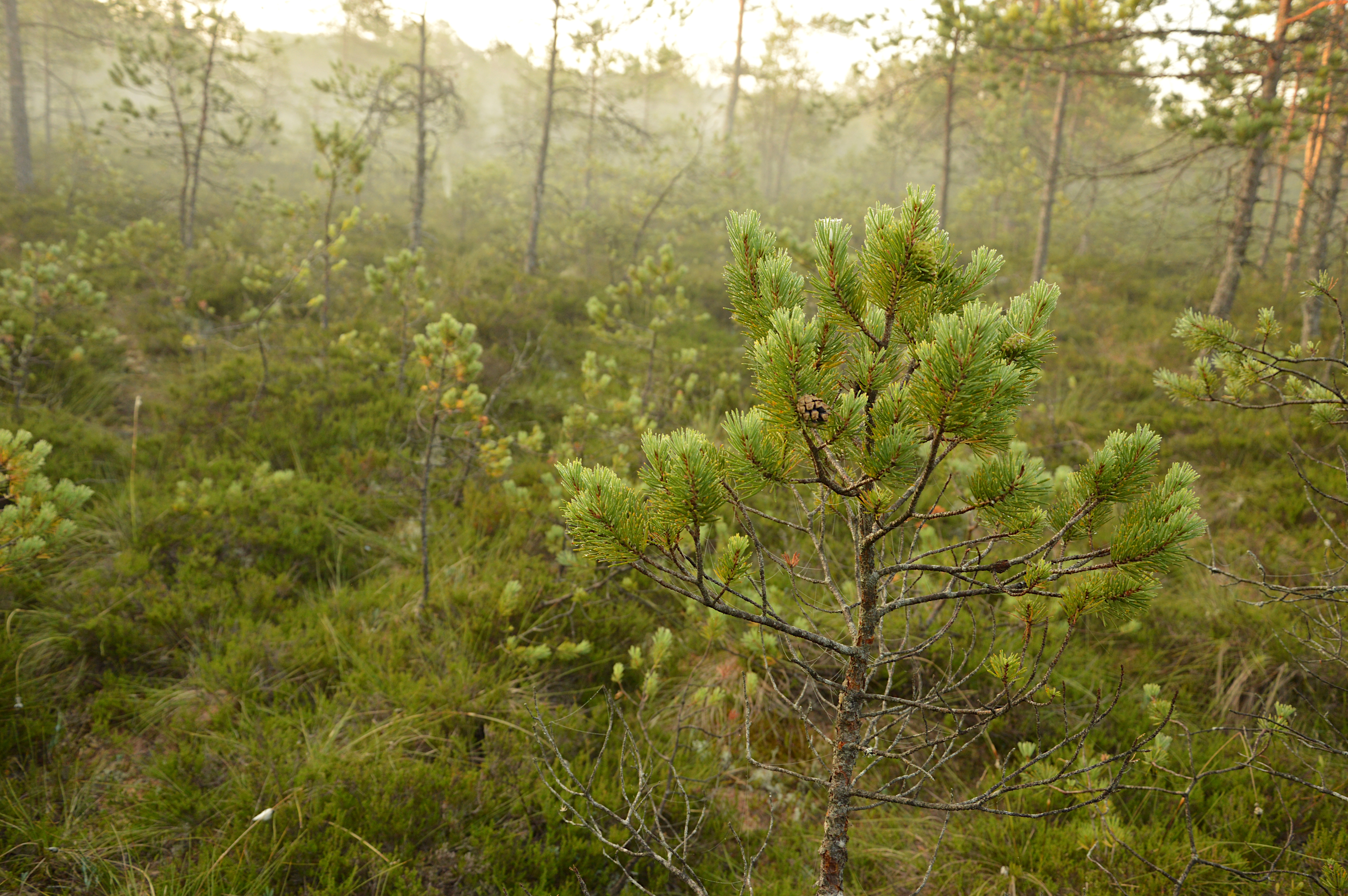

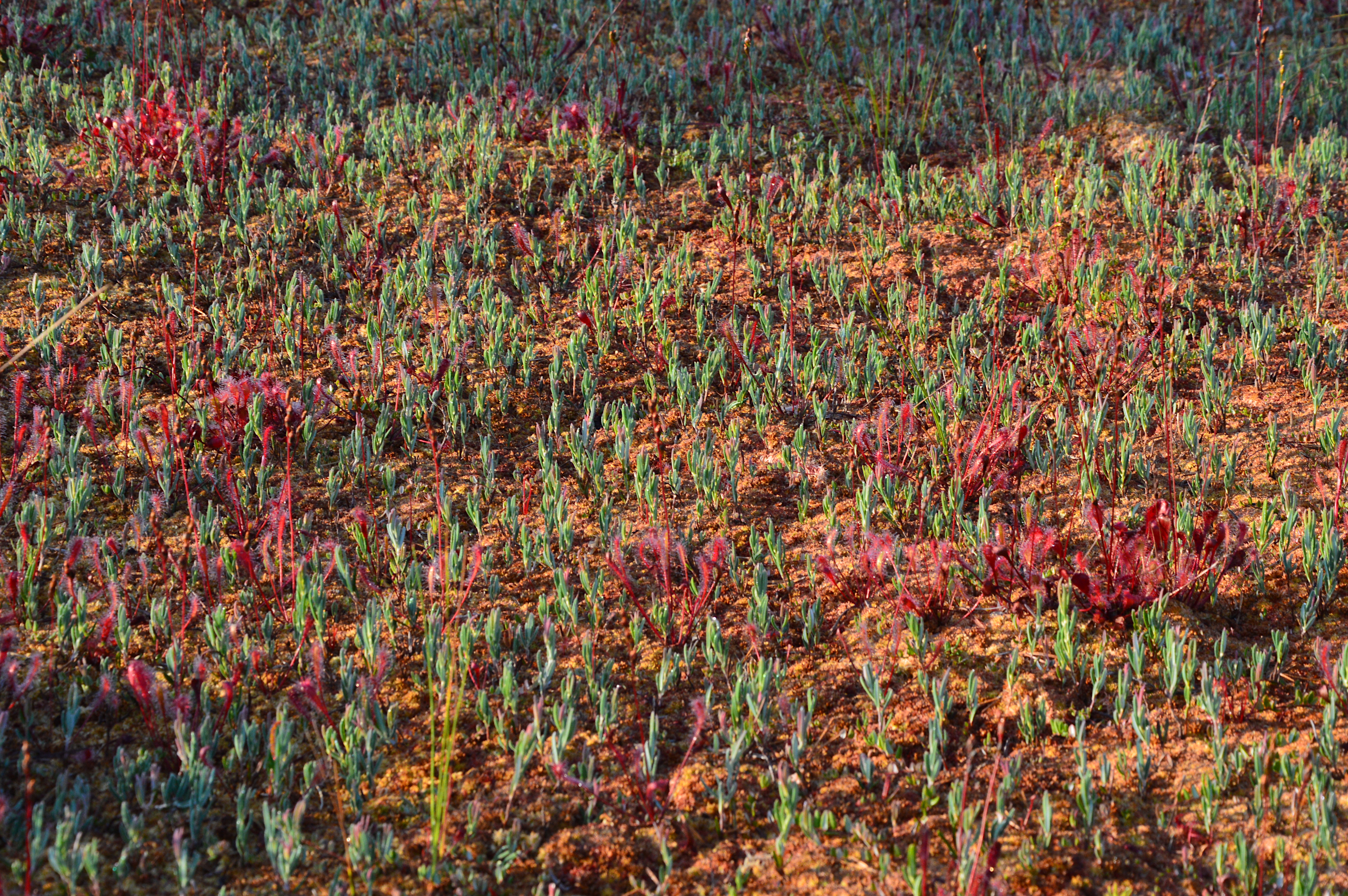

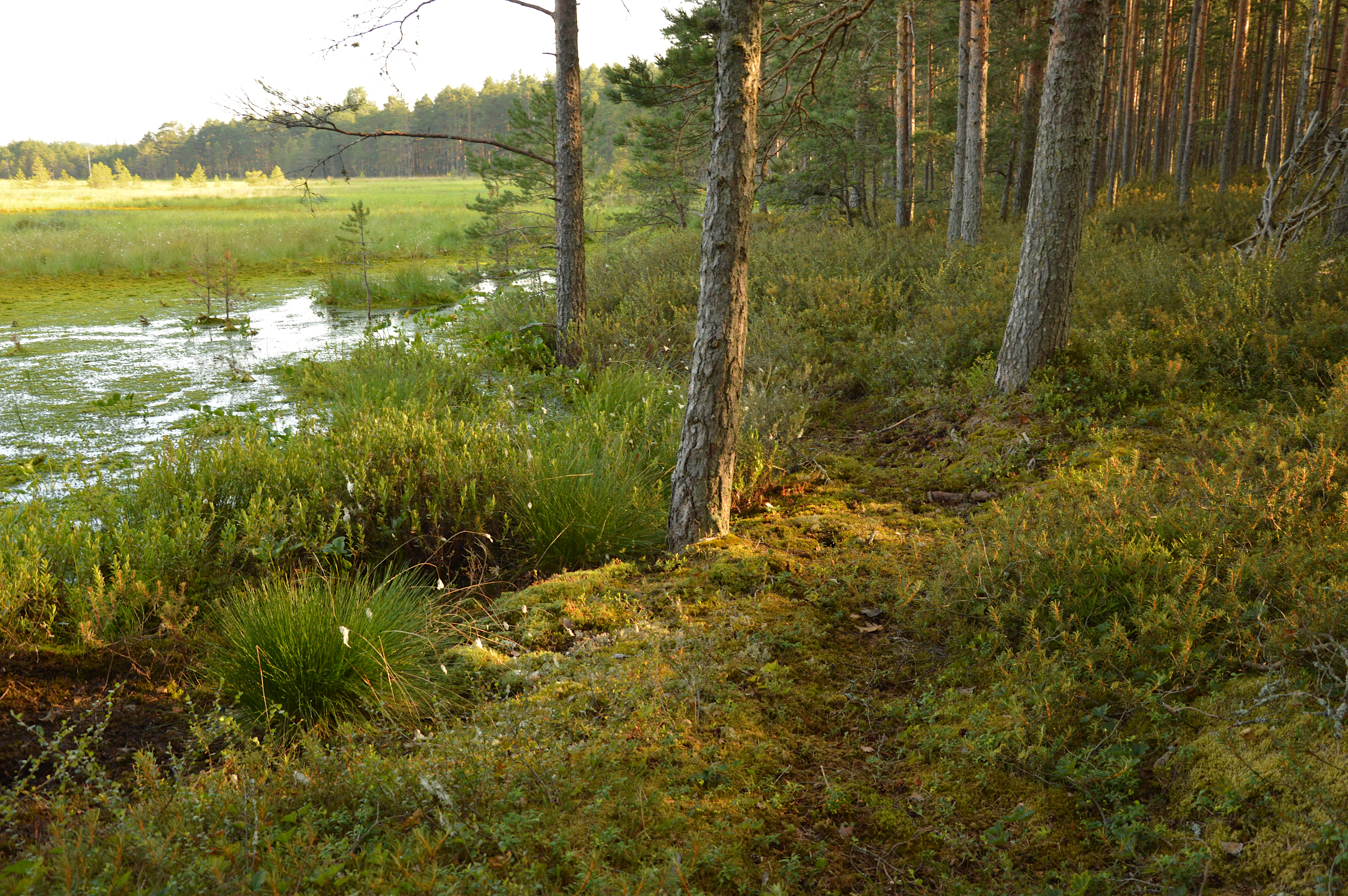

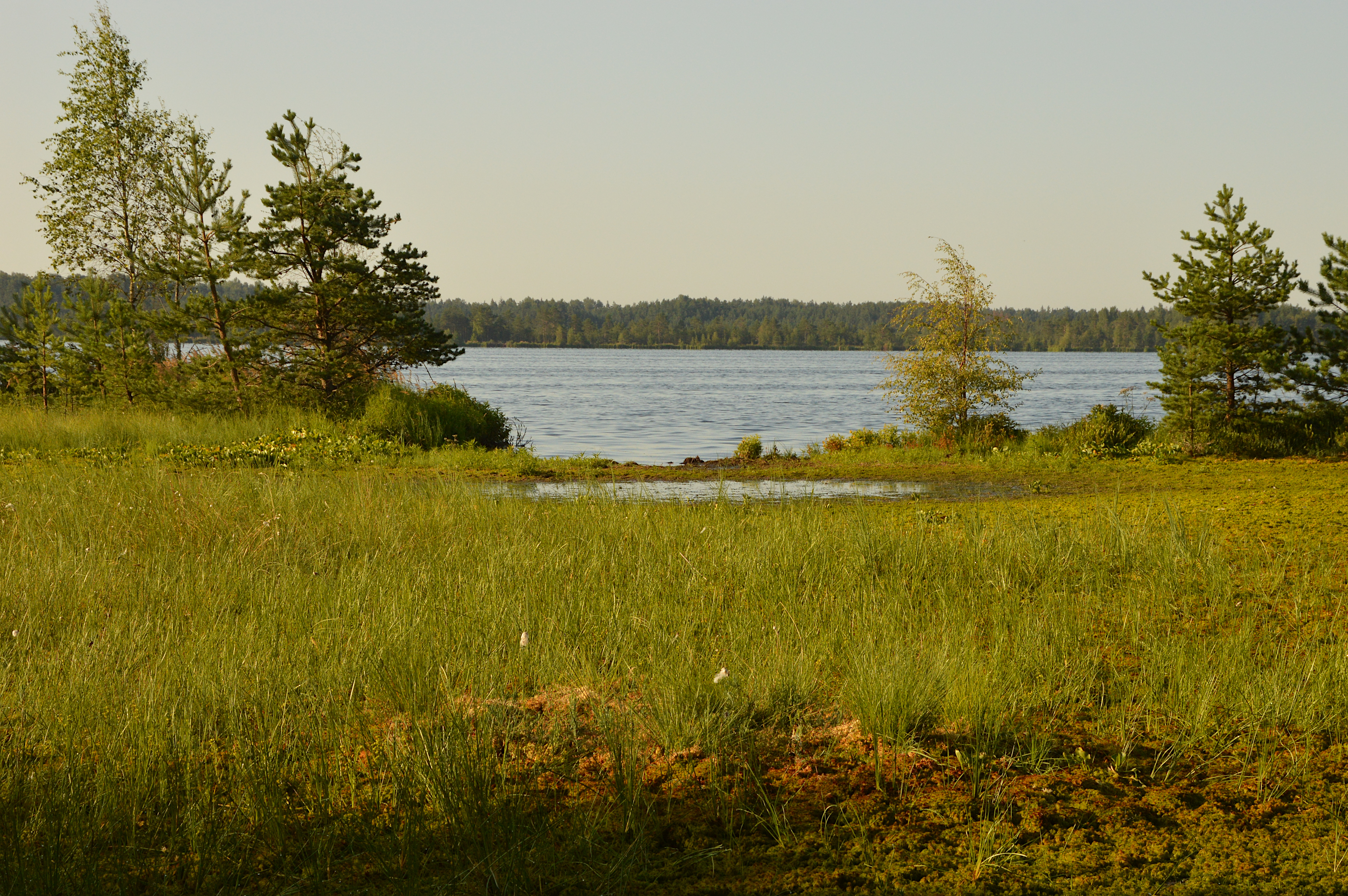

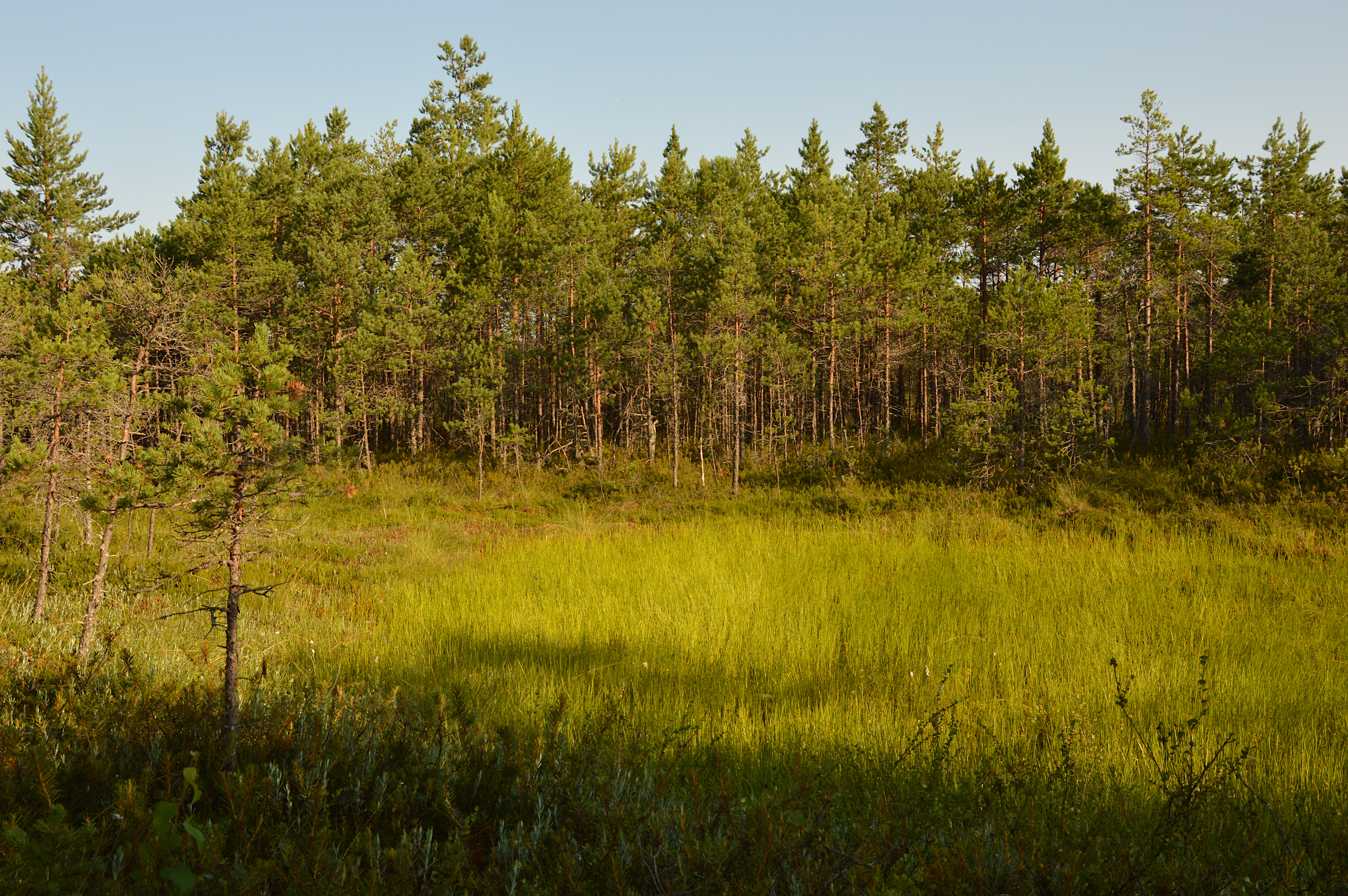
