= Arbavere =

Village in Estonia

Coordinates: 59°26′N 25°58′E

- Village
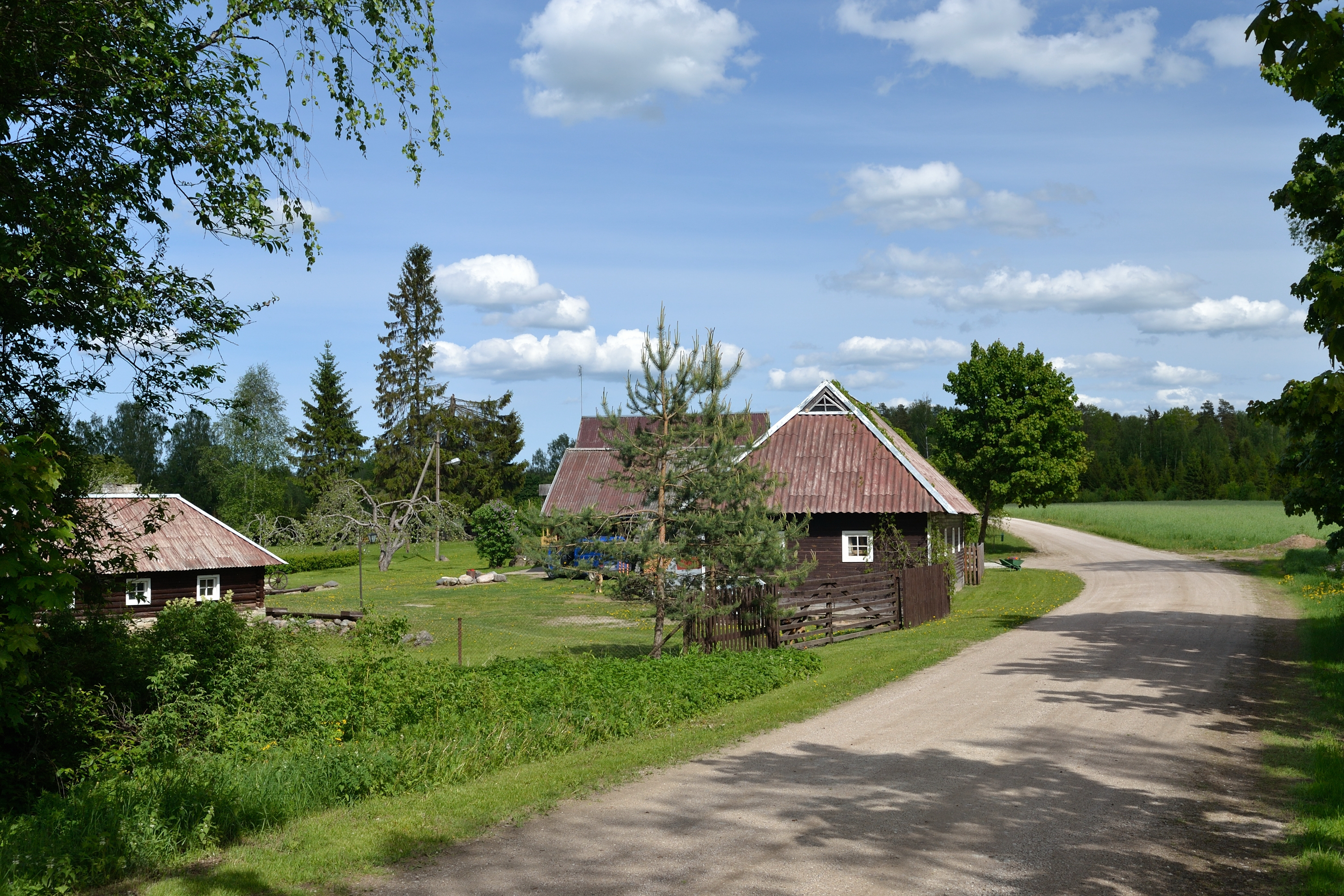
- Interactive map of Arbavere
- Country: Estonia
- County: Lääne-Viru County
- Parish: Kadrina Parish
- Time zone: UTC+2 (EET)
  - Summer (DST): UTC+3 (EEST)

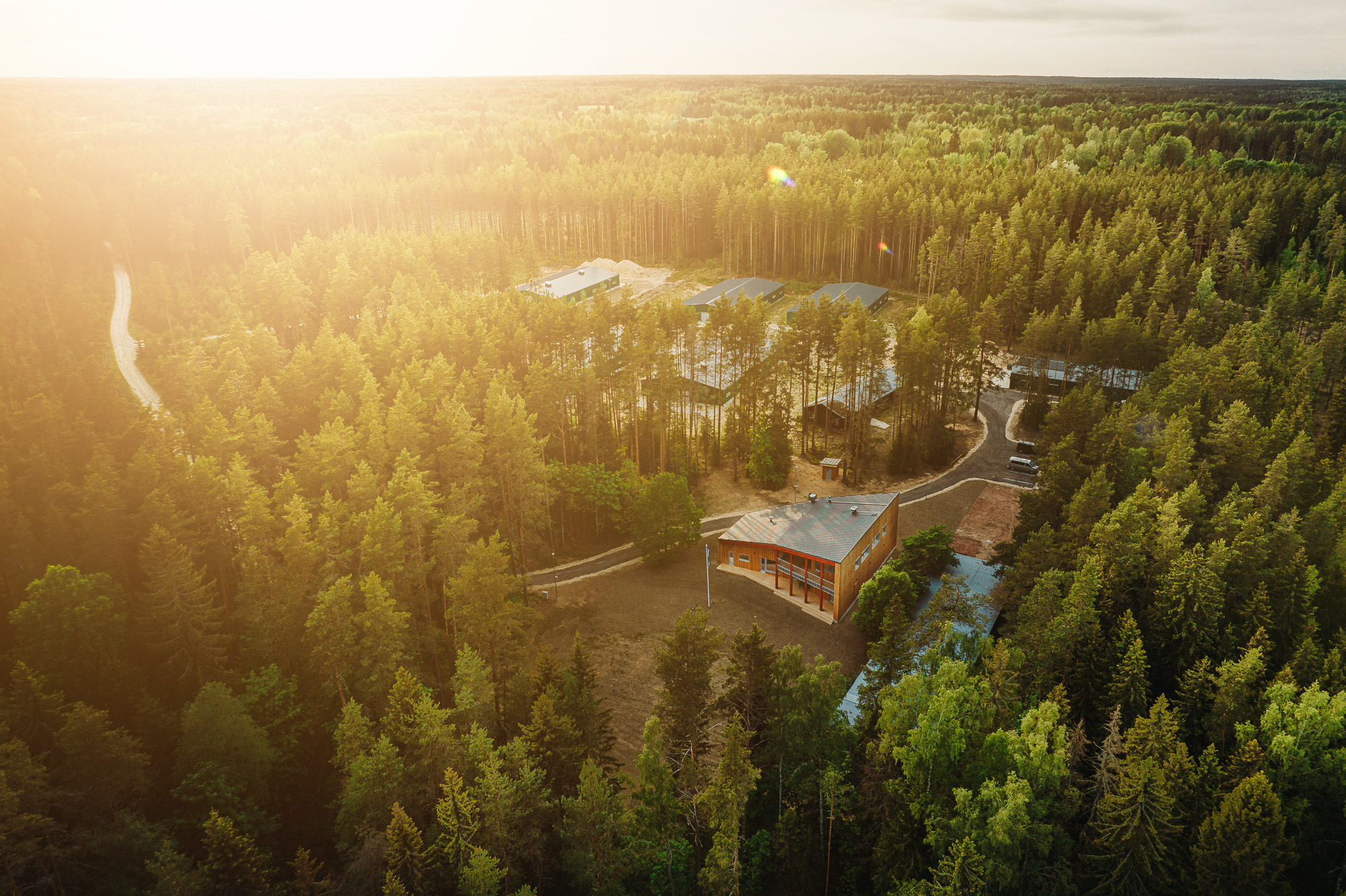
Research base for Estonian geological survey in Arbavere

Arbavere is a village in Kadrina Parish, Lääne-Viru County, in northeastern Estonia. It lies on the Loobu River.
