= Jõepere =

Village in Estonia

Coordinates: 59°17′N 26°12′E

- Village
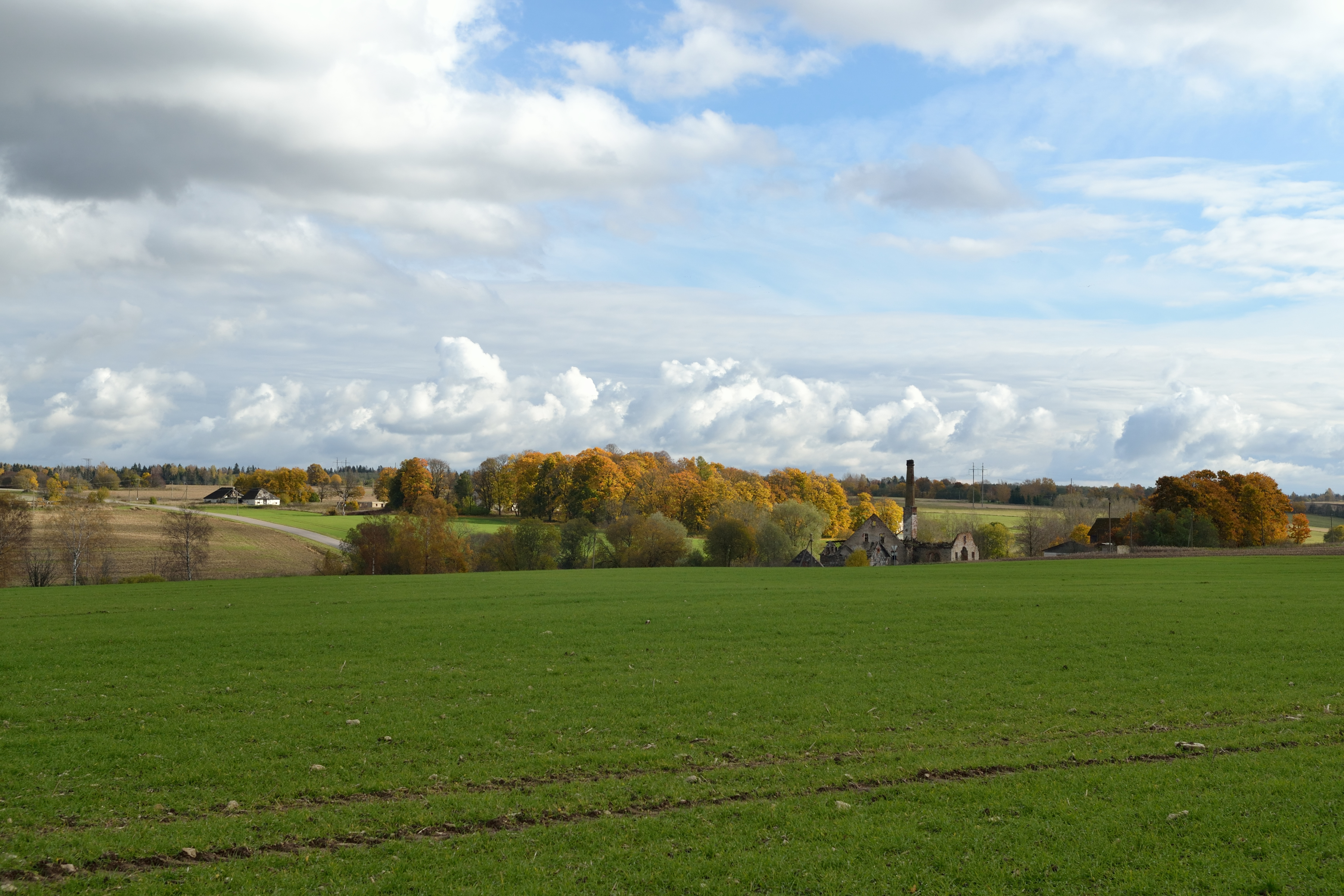
- Jõepere manor distillery ruins
- Interactive map of Jõepere
- Country: Estonia
- County: Lääne-Viru County
- Parish: Kadrina Parish
- Time zone: UTC+2 (EET)
  - Summer (DST): UTC+3 (EEST)

Jõepere (German: Joemper) is a village in Kadrina Parish, Lääne-Viru County, in northeastern Estonia. It's the origin of the Loobu River.

Writer Friedrich Reinhold Kreutzwald (1803–1882) was born in Jõepere Manor.
