= Juminda Lighthouse =

Lighthouse in Estonia

Juminda Lighthouse Juminda tuletorn
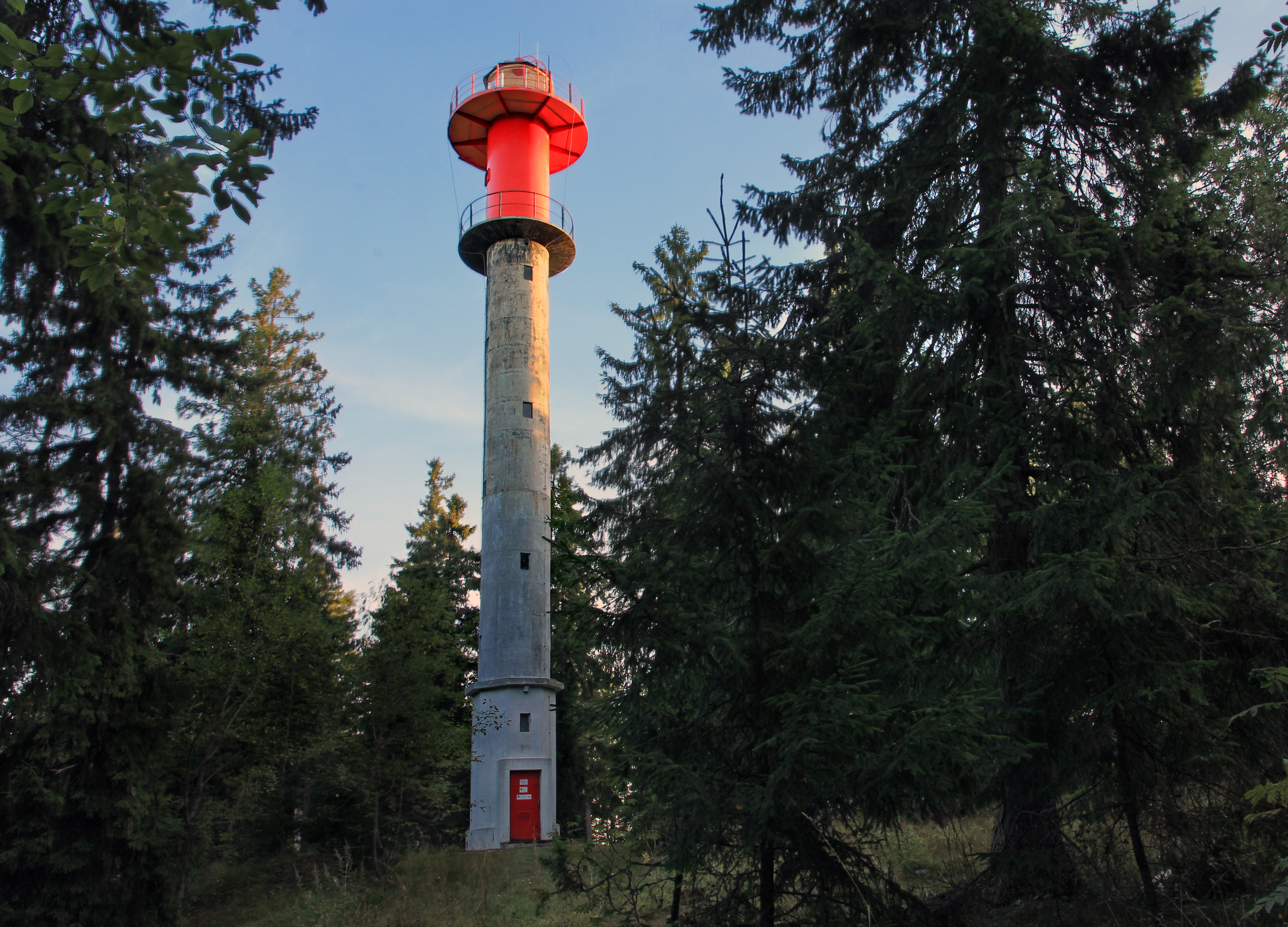
- Location: Kuusalu Parish; Harju County; Estonia
- Coordinates: 59.646591°N 25.510350°E

Tower
- Constructed: 1931 (first)
- Construction: concrete tower
- Height: 32 metres (105 ft)
- Shape: cylindrical tower with double balcony and lantern
- Markings: white lower tower and red upper
- Operator: Lahemaa National Park

Light
- First lit: 1937 (current)
- Focal height: 40 metres (130 ft)
- Range: 12 nautical miles (22 km; 14 mi)
- Characteristic: LFI W(2) 15s.
- Estonia no.: EST-022

Juminda Lighthouse (Estonian: Juminda tuletorn) is a lighthouse at the northern tip of the Juminda Peninsula, Kuusalu Parish, in the region of Harju, Estonia. It is located in the Lahemaa National Park.

The lighthouse was built in 1937. It is a circular concrete tower with a lantern and double gallery. The upper portion of the lighthouse is painted red, the lower is painted white. Prior to 2006, the lighthouse had a height of 24 metres, the red portion at the top was added in 2006. The lighthouse has a glare configuration of: 3 s on, 2 s off, 3 s on, and 7 s off.

== See also ==
- List of lighthouses in Estonia
