= Friedrich Reinhold Kreutzwald =

Estonian writer, author of the national epic Kalevipoeg (1803-1882)

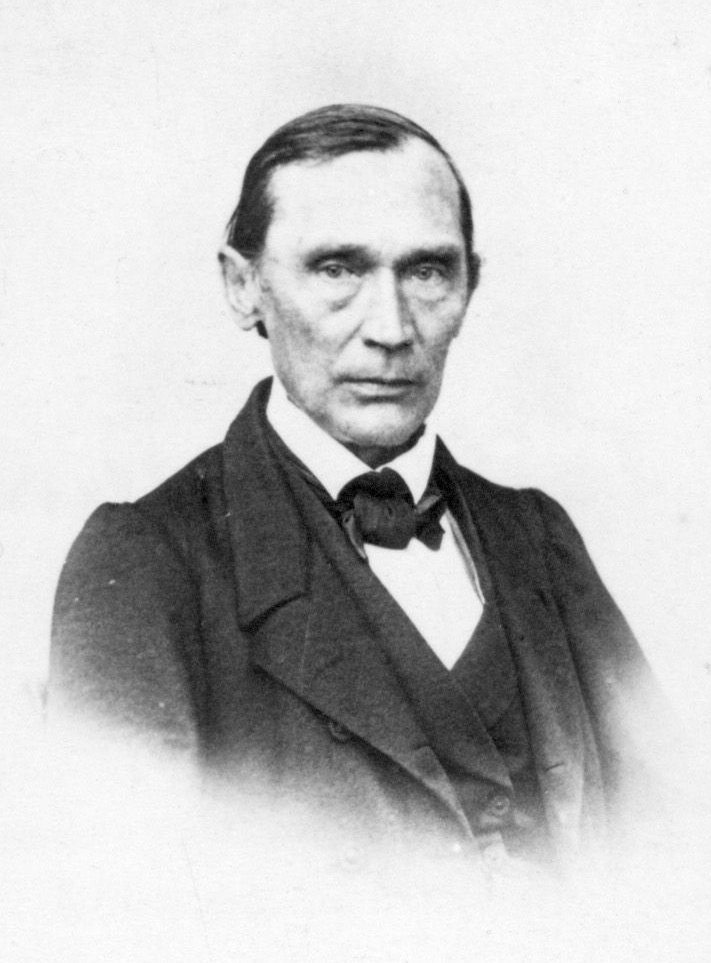
- Born: 26 December [O.S. 14 December] 1803; Jömper Manor, Jömper, Kreis Wierland, Governorate of Estonia, Russian Empire (in present-day Jõepere, Lääne-Viru County, Estonia)
- Died: 25 August [O.S. 13 August] 1882 (aged 78); Dorpat, Kreis Dorpat, Governorate of Livonia, Russian Empire (present-day Tartu, Tartu County, Estonia)
- Resting place: Raadi cemetery
- Occupation: Writer
- Movement: Estonian national awakening

Friedrich Reinhold Kreutzwald (26 December [O.S. 14 December] 1803 – 25 August [O.S. 13 August] 1882) was an Estonian writer who is considered to be the father of the national literature for the country. He is the author of Estonian national epic Kalevipoeg.

== Life ==
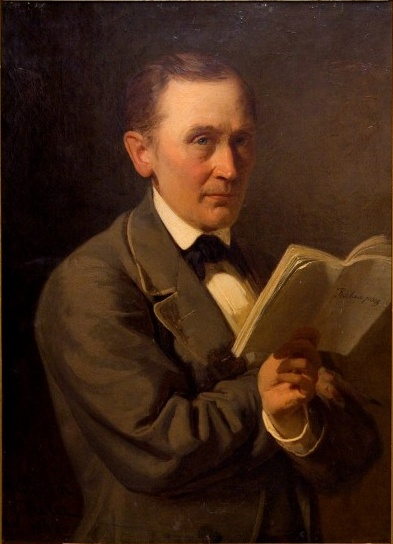
Kreutzwald reading a manuscript of Kalevipoeg by Johann Köler (1864).

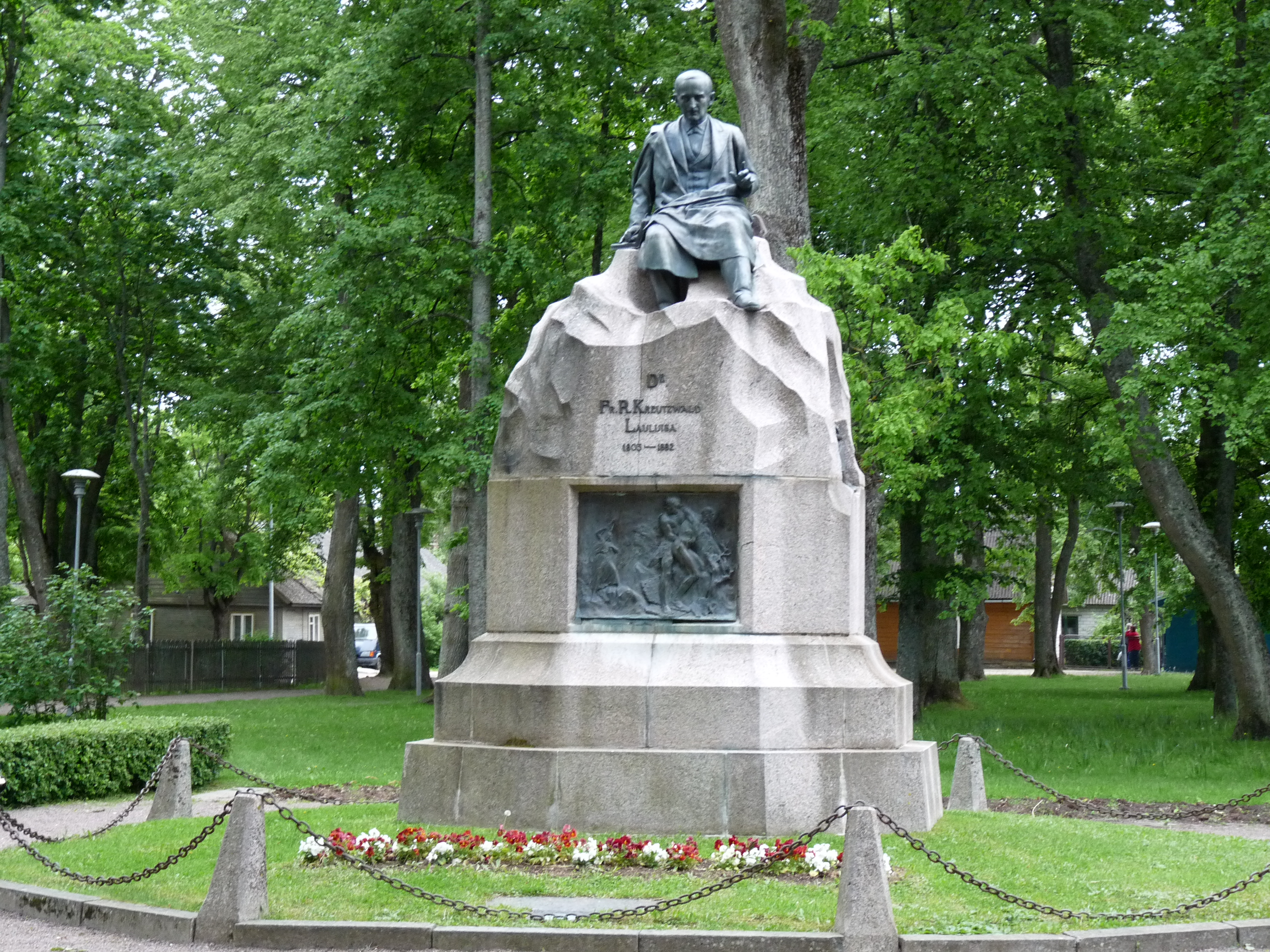
Kreuzwald Memorial in Võru by Amandus Adamson (1926).

Friedrich Reinhold Kreutzwald's parents were serfs at the Jömper estate, Governorate of Estonia, Russian Empire (in present-day Jõepere, Lääne-Viru County). His father Juhan worked as a shoemaker and granary keeper and his mother Anne was a chambermaid. After liberation from serfdom in 1815, the family was able to send their son to school at the Wesenberg (present-day Rakvere) district school.

In 1820, he graduated from secondary school in Dorpat (present-day Tartu, Tartu County, Estonia) and worked as an elementary school teacher. In 1833, Kreutzwald graduated from the Faculty of Medicine at the Imperial University of Dorpat.

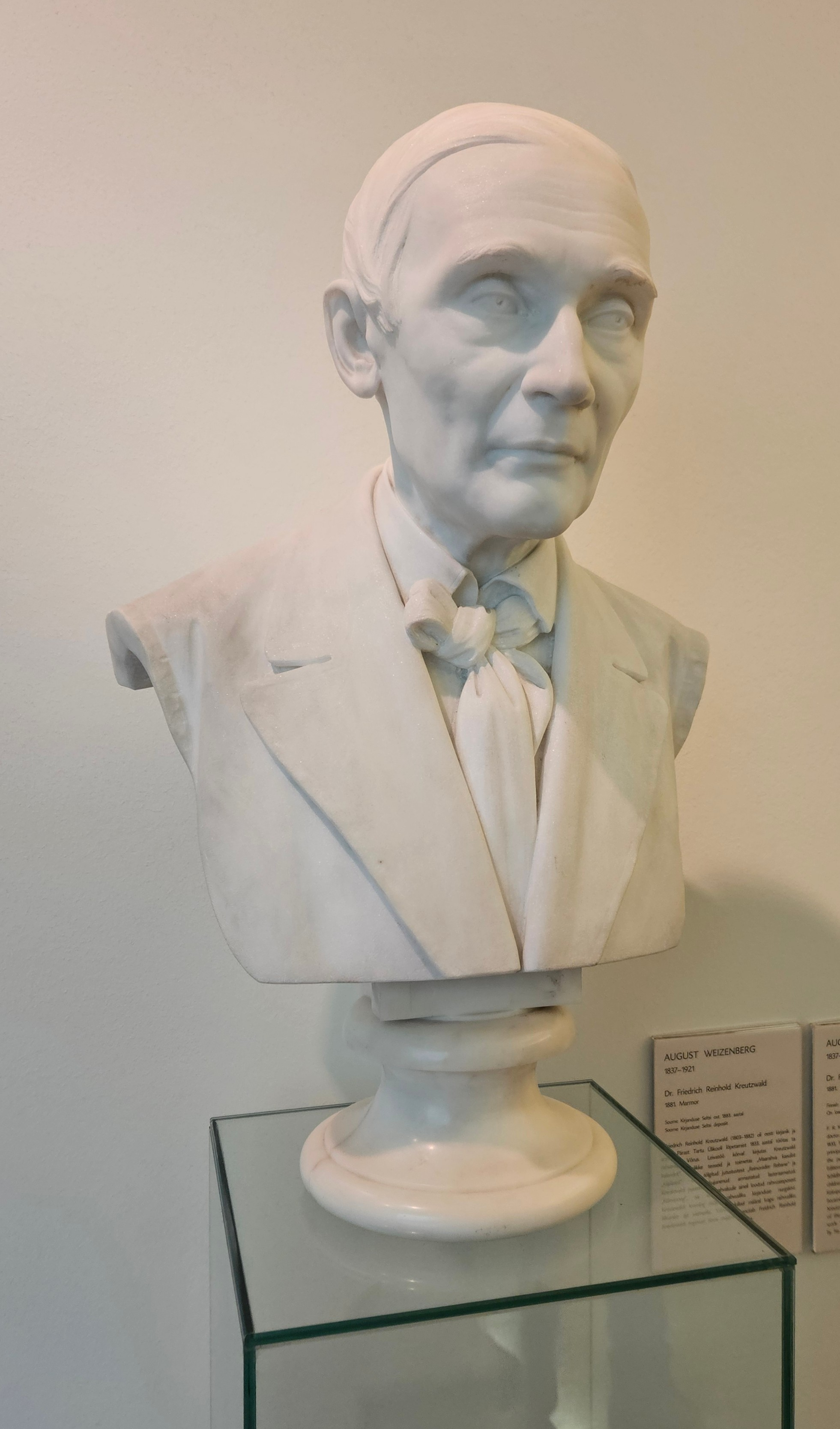
Bust of Kreutzwald by August Weizenberg, 1881

Kreutzwald married Marie Elisabeth Saedler on 18 August the same year. From 1833 to 1877, he worked as the municipal physician in Werro (present-day Võru). He was the member of numerous scientific societies in Europe and received honorary doctorates from a number of universities.

== Works ==
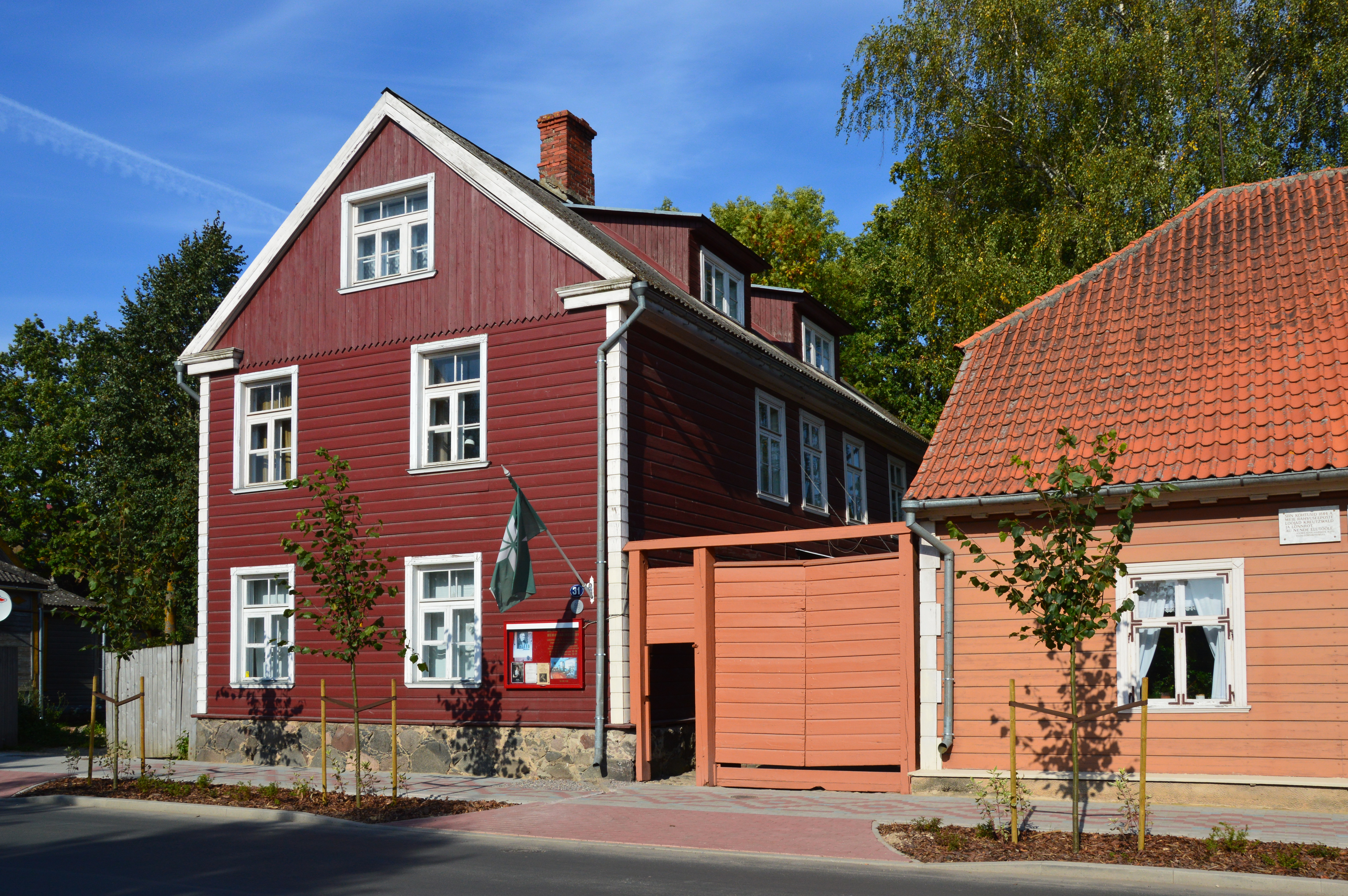
Kreutzwald Memorial Museum in Võru

Kreutzwald is the author of several moralistic folk books, most of them adapted or translated from German: Pest of Spirit (Branntweinpest) 1840, The World and Some Things One Can Find in It 1848–49, Reynard the Fox 1850, and The Wise men of Kilpla (Schildbürger) 1857. In addition to these works, he composed the national epic Kalevipoeg (Kalev's Son), using material initially gathered by his friend Friedrich Robert Faehlmann; and wrote many other works based on Estonian folklore, such as Old Estonian Fairy-Tales (1866), collections of verses, and the poem Lembitu (1885), published after his death.

Kreutzwald is considered to be the author of the first original Estonian book. He was one of the leaders of the national awakening, as well as a paragon and encourager of young Estonian-speaking intellectuals.

== See also ==
- Andrew Lang's Fairy Books
- J. R. R. Tolkien
- Kalevala
