= Altja =

Village in Estonia

Coordinates: 59°35′N 26°07′E

- Village
- Interactive map of Altja
- Country: Estonia
- County: Lääne-Viru County
- Parish: Haljala Parish
- Time zone: UTC+2 (EET)
  - Summer (DST): UTC+3 (EEST)

Altja is a village in Haljala Parish, Lääne-Viru County, in northern Estonia, on the territory of Lahemaa National Park.

== Gallery ==
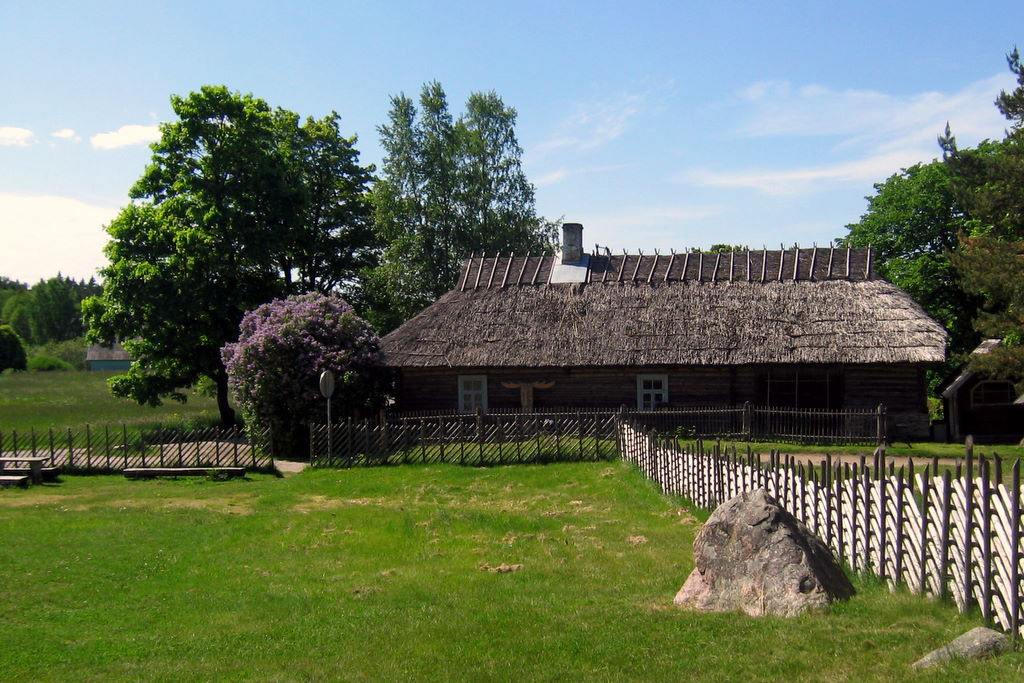
Altja Tavern

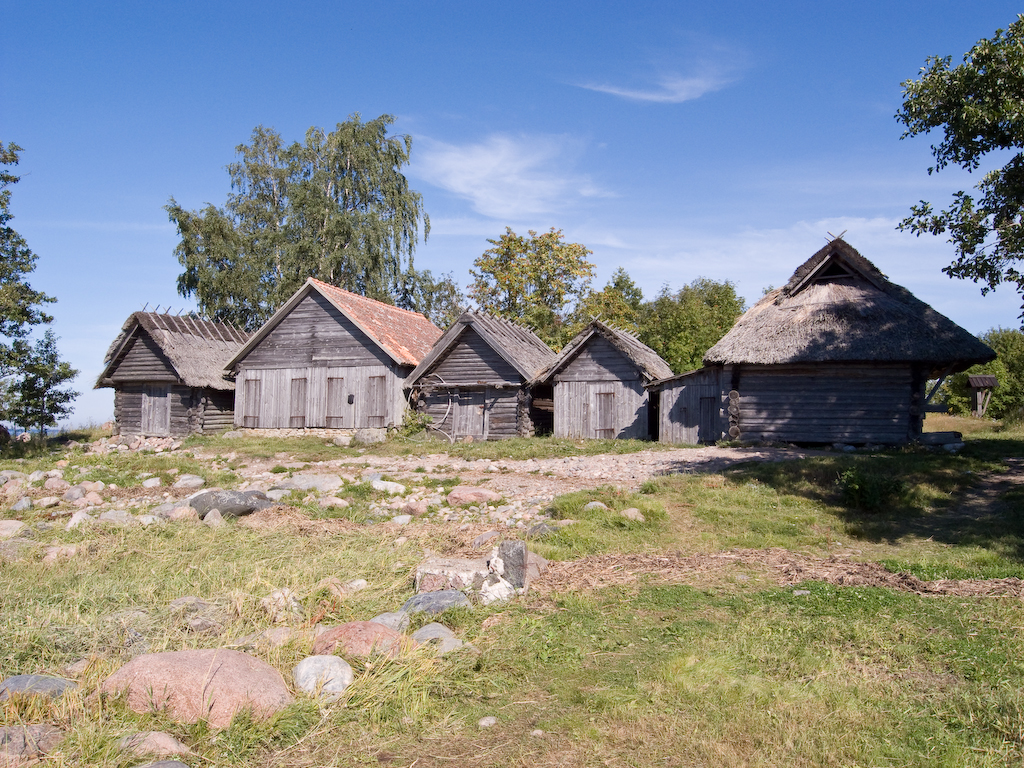

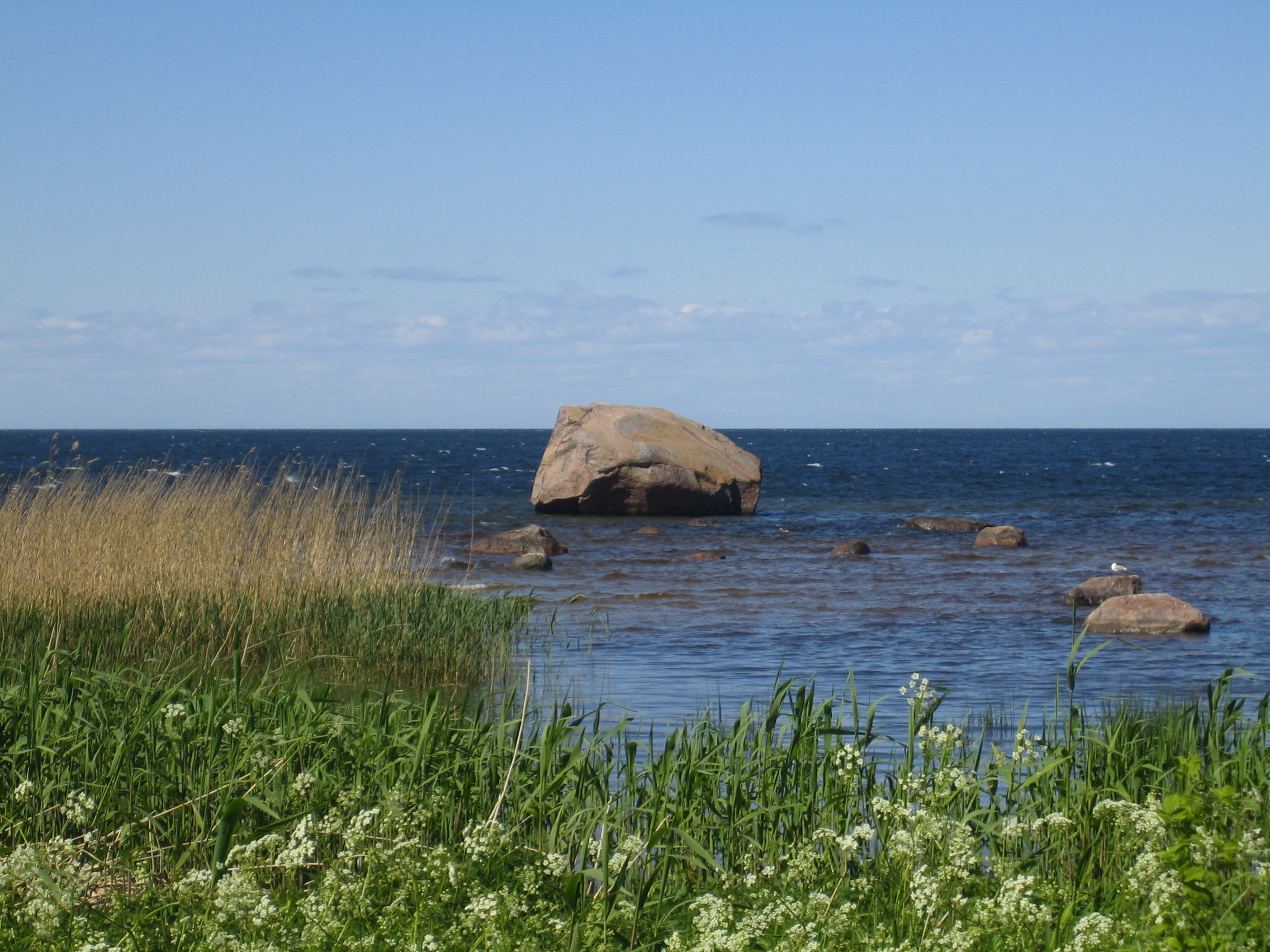

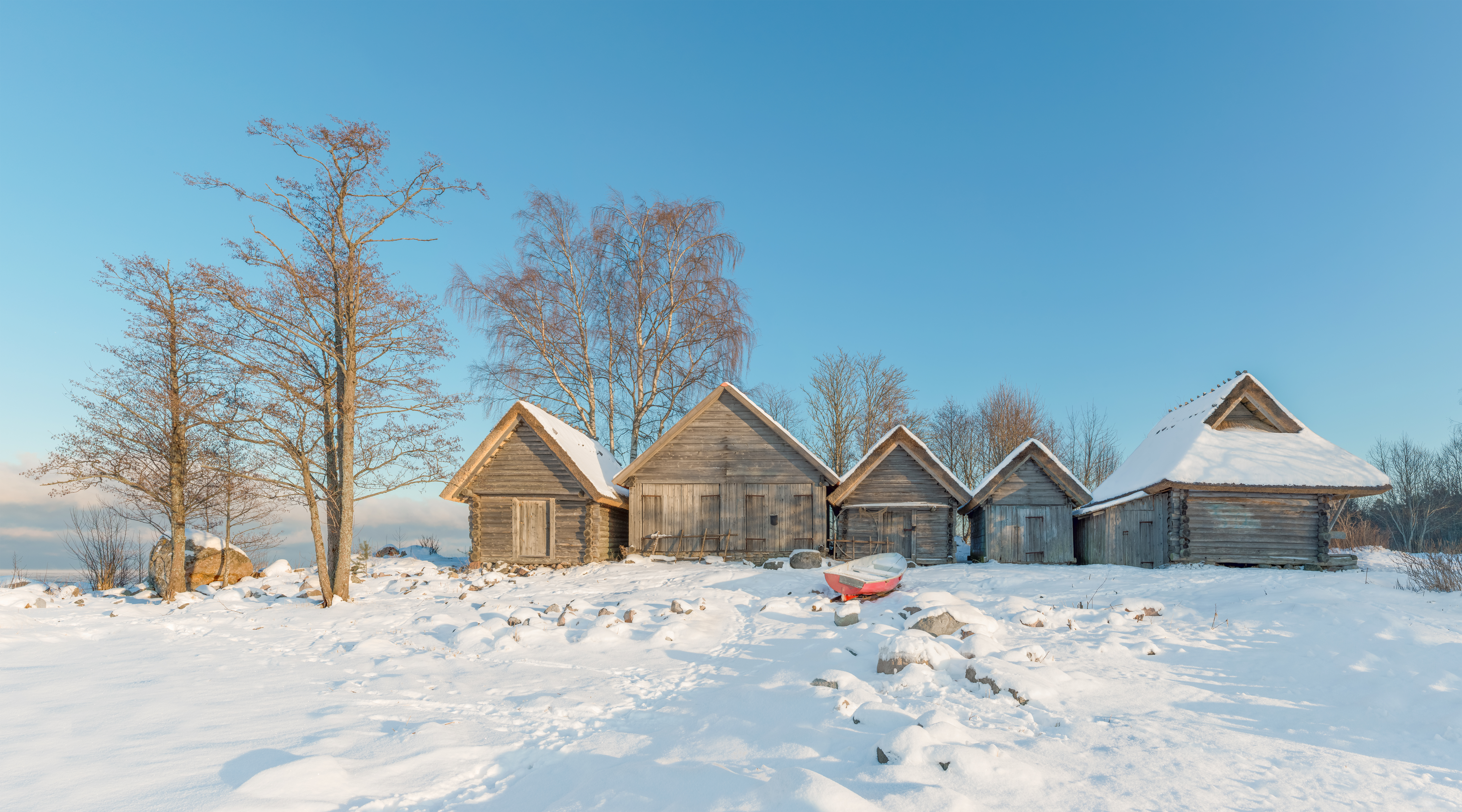
Fishermen huts by the southern shore of Gulf of Finland in Altja fishermen village at Lahemaa National Park.
