= Eru Bay =

Bay in Estonia

Coordinates: 59°36′N 25°49′E

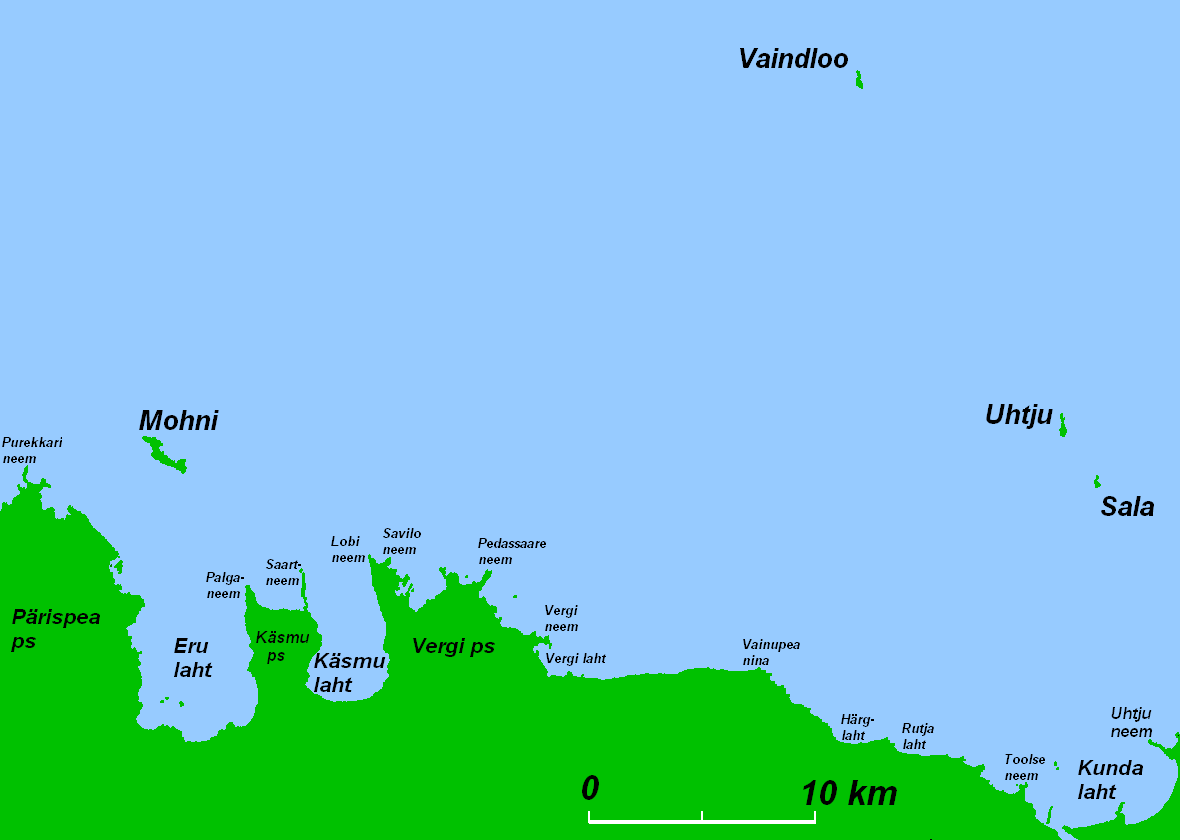
Location of the bay

Eru Bay (Estonian: Eru laht, also Estonian: Mungalaht) is bay in Kuusalu Parish (Harju County) and Haljala Parish, Lääne-Viru County in Estonia; the bay is part of Gulf of Finland. Area of the bay is 7656 ha.

The bay is bordered by Pärispea Peninsula and Käsmu Peninsula.

Loobu River drains into Eru Bay.
