= Loobu (river) =

River in Estonia

Coordinates: 59°34′14″N 25°47′49″E

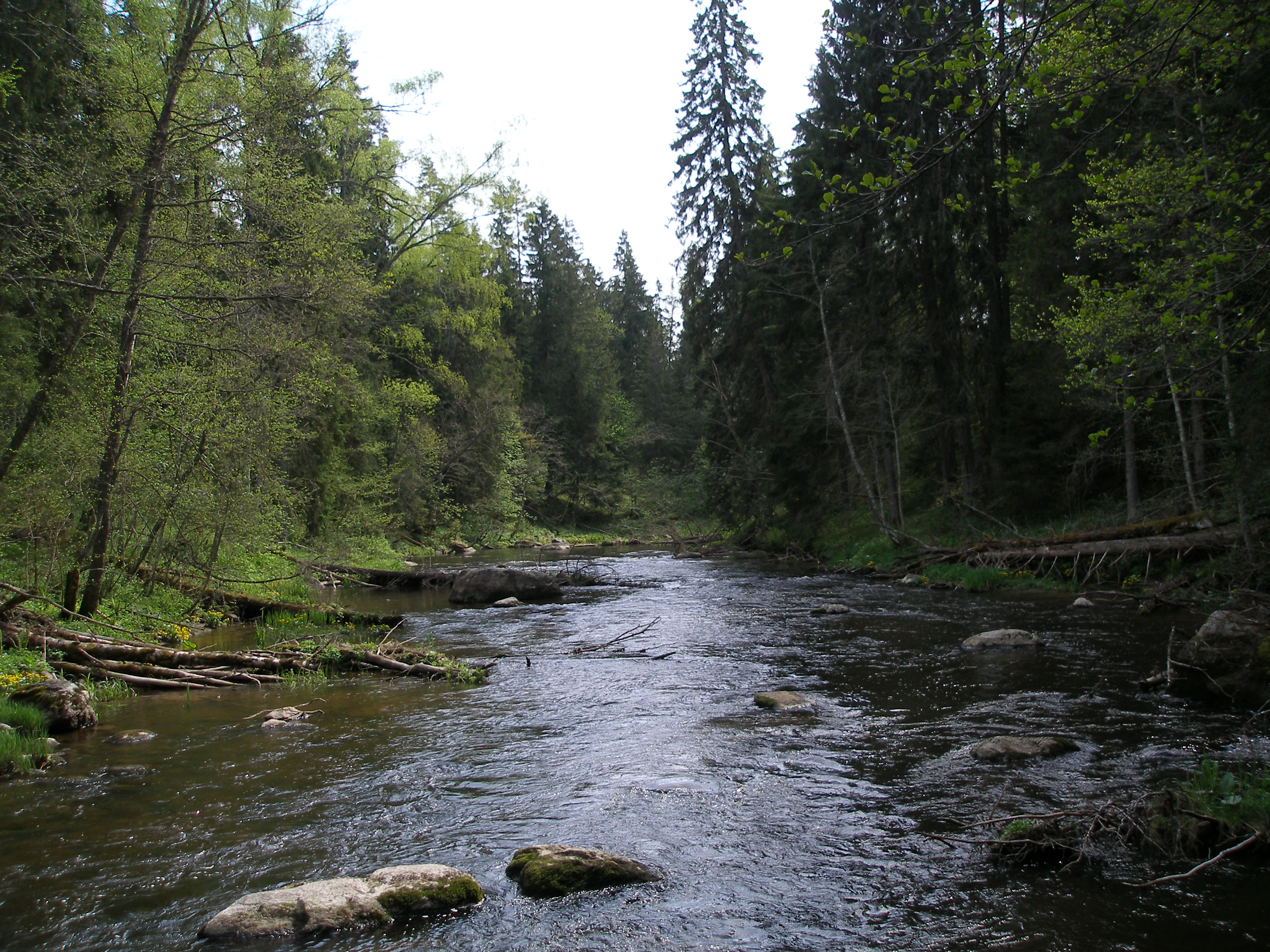
- The Loobu near Porgaste

Location
- Country: Estonia

Physical characteristics
- Source
  - location: Jõepere village in Pandivere
  - elevation: 90 m (300 ft)
- Mouth
  - location: Eru Bay, Gulf of Finland
  - elevation: 0 m (0 ft)
- Length: 62 km (39 mi)
- Basin size: 308 km^{2} (119 sq mi)
- Discharge
  - average: 2.5–3.0 m^{3}/s (88–106 cu ft/s)

The Loobu is a river in northern Estonia. Its source is about 12 km southwest of Rakvere in Lääne-Viru County and it drains into Eru Bay (part of Finnish Gulf) near the village of Vihasoo in Lahemaa National Park.

Its drainage basin is rather small and narrow. The Loobu lacks any major tributaries.

At Joaveski, 10 km upstream from its mouth, the Loobu flows over the Baltic Klint, forming Joaveski Falls.

Kadrina (population: 2,600) is the only significant settlement on the river.

== Gallery ==
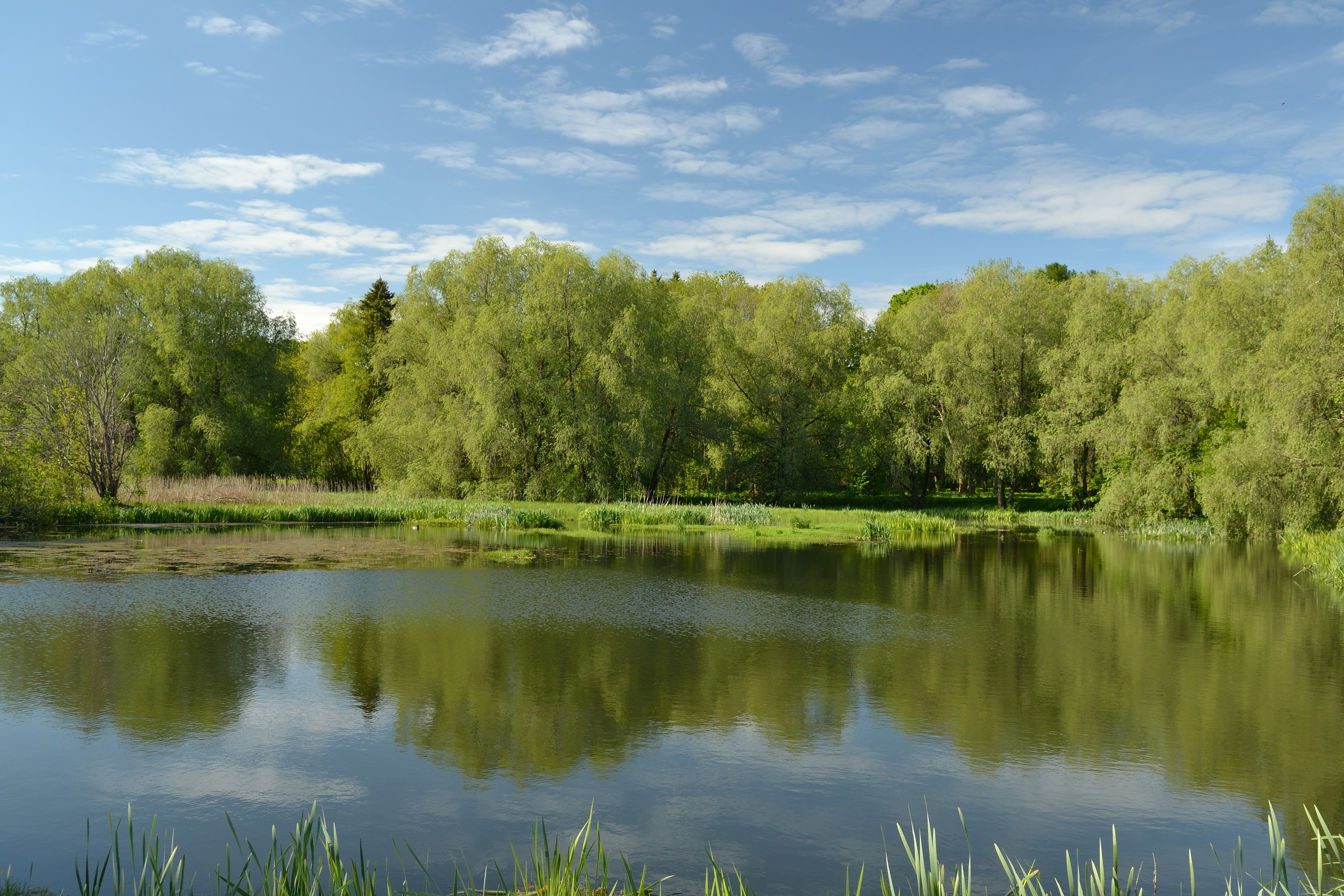
Undla, an impounded lake on the Loobu

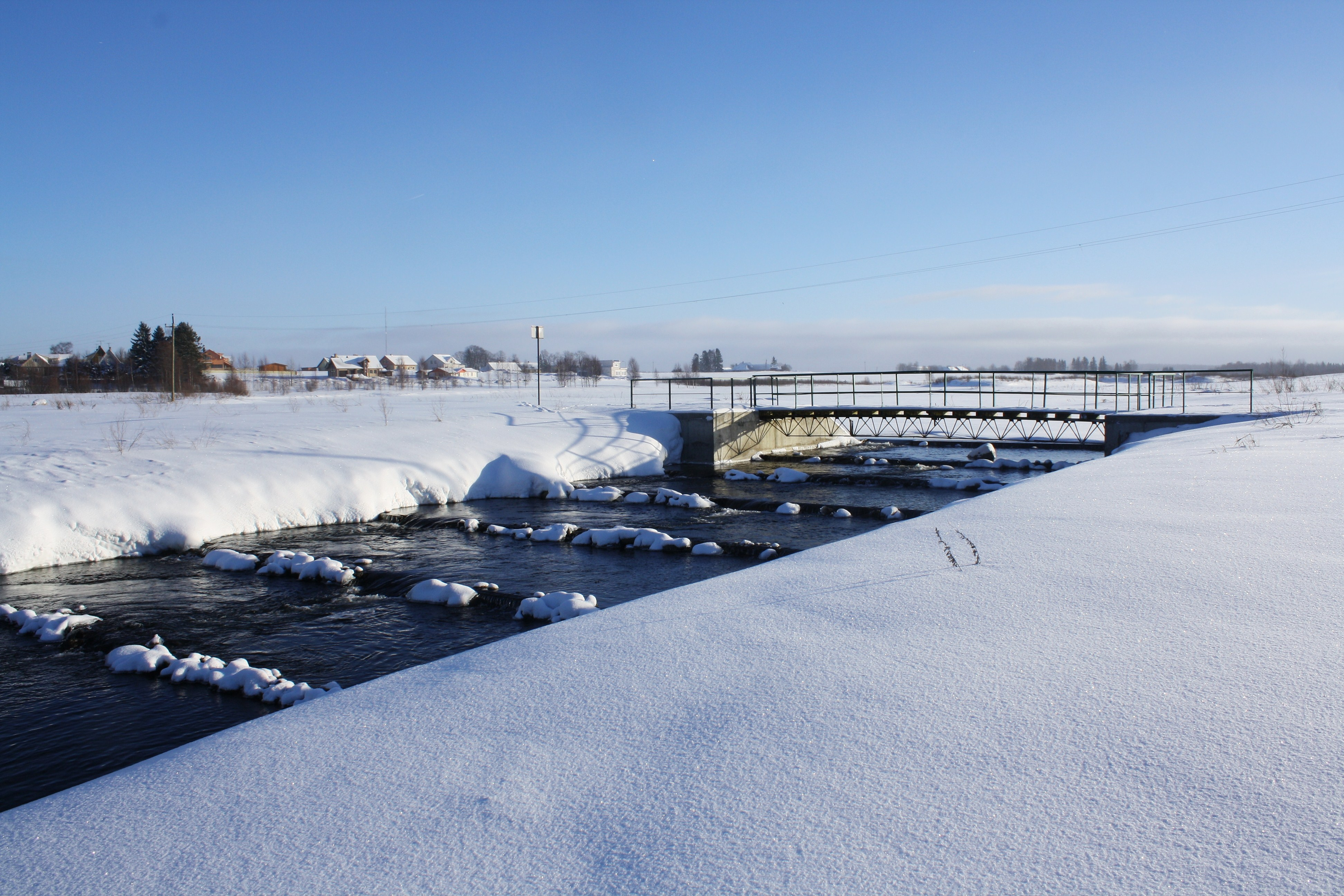
A fish ladder on the Loobu

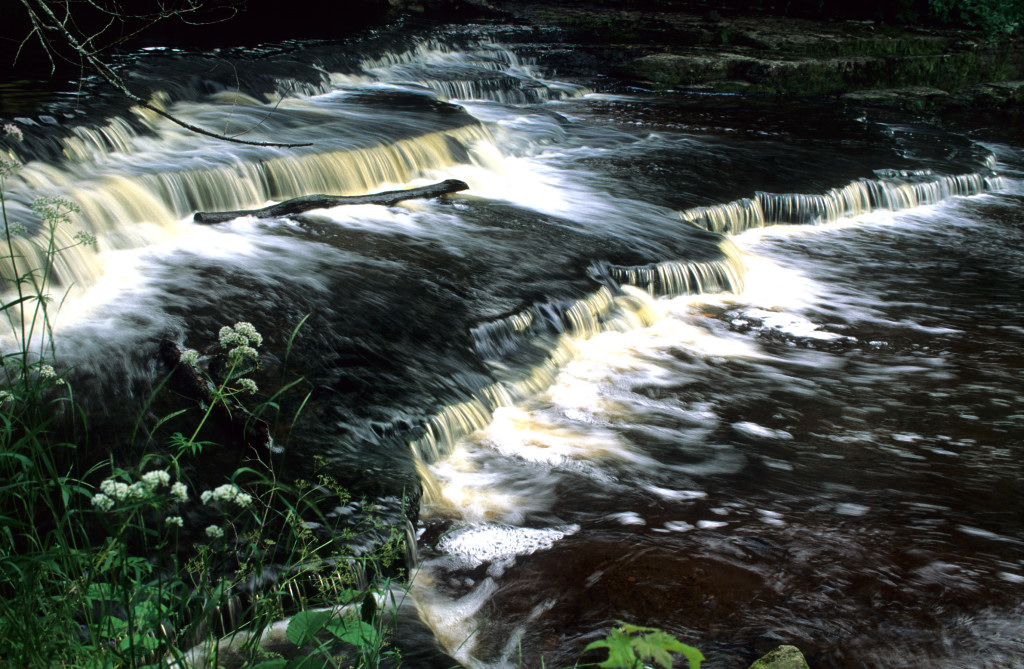
Joaveski Falls
