= Lahemaa National Park =

National park located in northern Estonia

- IUCN category II (national park)
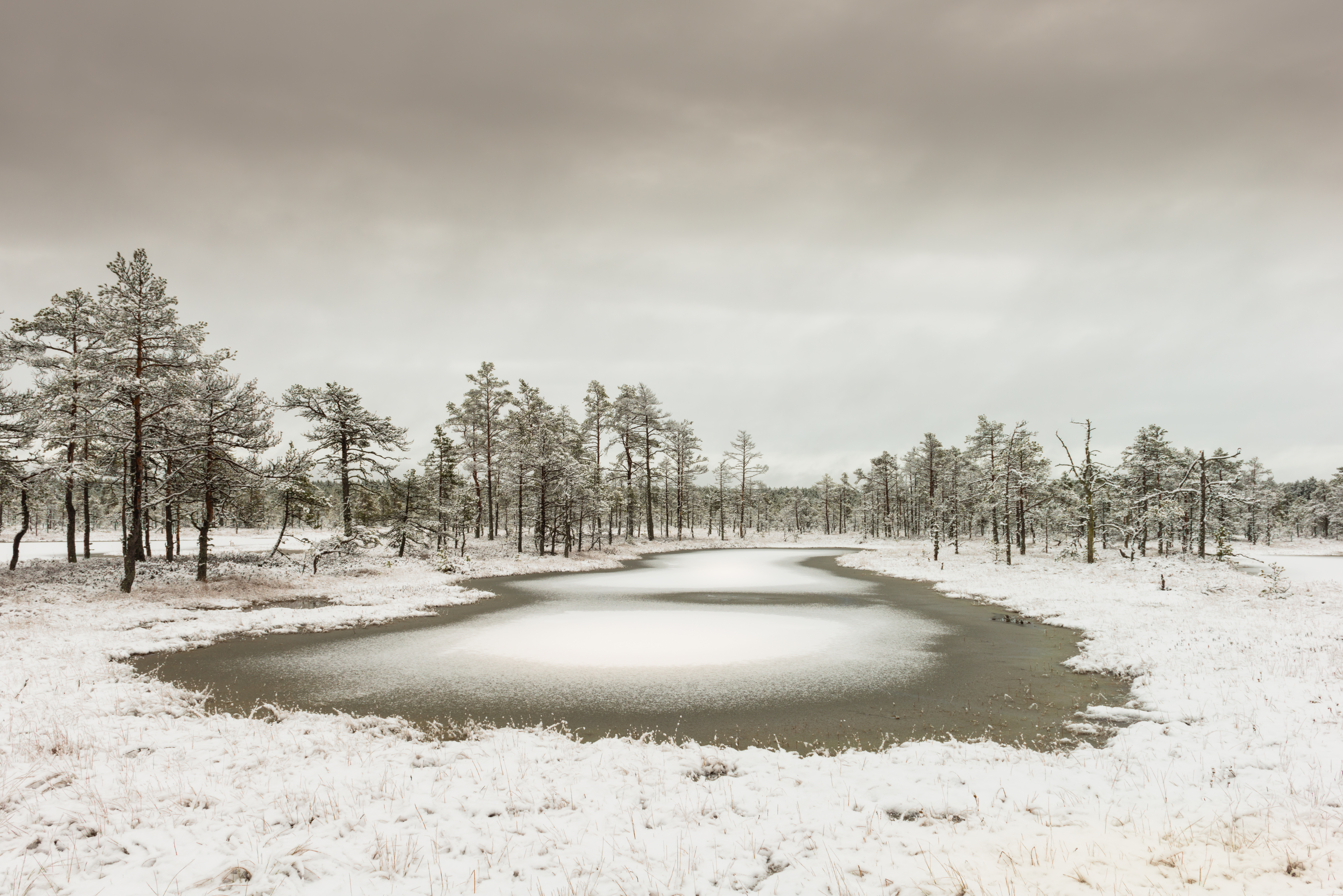
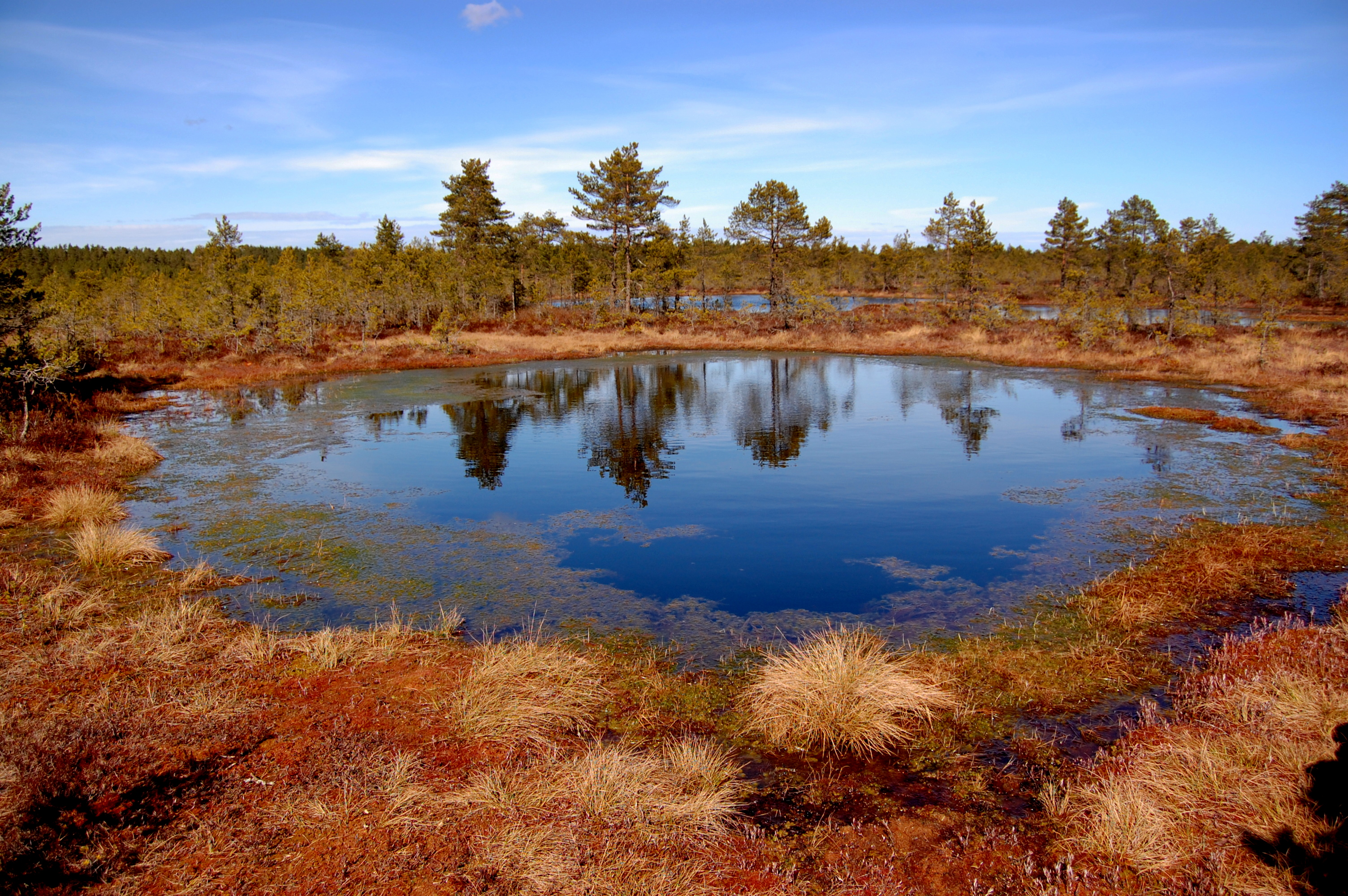
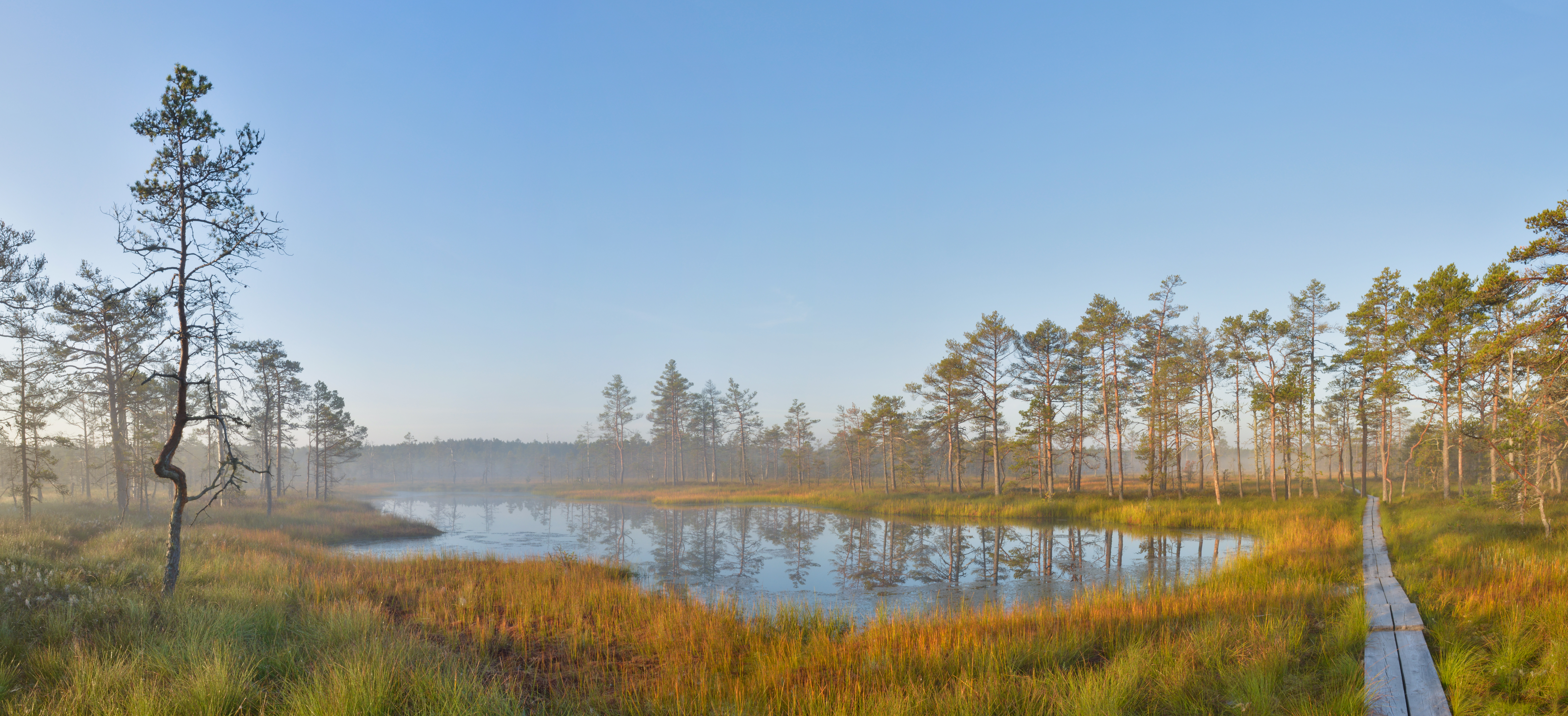
- The Viru bog in Lahemaa National Park across seasons.

- Location: Estonia
- Coordinates: 59°34′16″N 25°48′1″E
- Area: 747 km^{2} (288 sq mi)
- Established: 1 July 1971
- Website: Lahemaa National Park

Lahemaa National Park is a park in northern Estonia, 70 kilometers east from the capital Tallinn. The Gulf of Finland is to the north of the park and the Tallinn-Narva highway (E20) to the south. Its area covers 747 km^{2} (including 274.9 km^{2} of sea). It was the first area to be designated a national park of the former Soviet Union. It is the largest park in Estonia and one of Europe's biggest national parks. Its charter calls for the preservation, research and promotion of North-Estonian landscapes, ecosystems, biodiversity and national heritage.

== History ==
The national park, established in 1971, is one of the main tourist draws in Estonia. Several companies offer day tour packages from Tallinn, while many people drive themselves.

=== Submarine base ===
Prior to 1991, the Soviet Union operated a large secret submarine base at Hara. The base was built in the 1950s during the height of the Cold War. The ruins of this former Soviet submarine base is now located entirely in Lahemaa near the Lahemaa lighthouse.

== Geography and ecology ==
The name Lahemaa originates from the most thoroughly studied and visited part of the North Estonian coast, where four large peninsulas (Juminda, Pärispea, Käsmu and Vergi) are separated from each other by four bays (Kolga, Hara, Eru and Käsmu). Lahemaa translates roughly as "Land of Bays".

With forests covering more than 70 percent of Lahemaa, the area is rich in flora and fauna. The landscape has many raised bogs, including the 7,000-year-old Laukasoo Reserve. The park, marked by several trails, teems with wildlife, including populations of wild boar, red deer, grey wolf, brown bear and Eurasian lynx. The coast is covered with rocks and boulders, used each year by cranes as a stopover on their way to the Bosphorus and Egypt.

=== Ulkkari ===
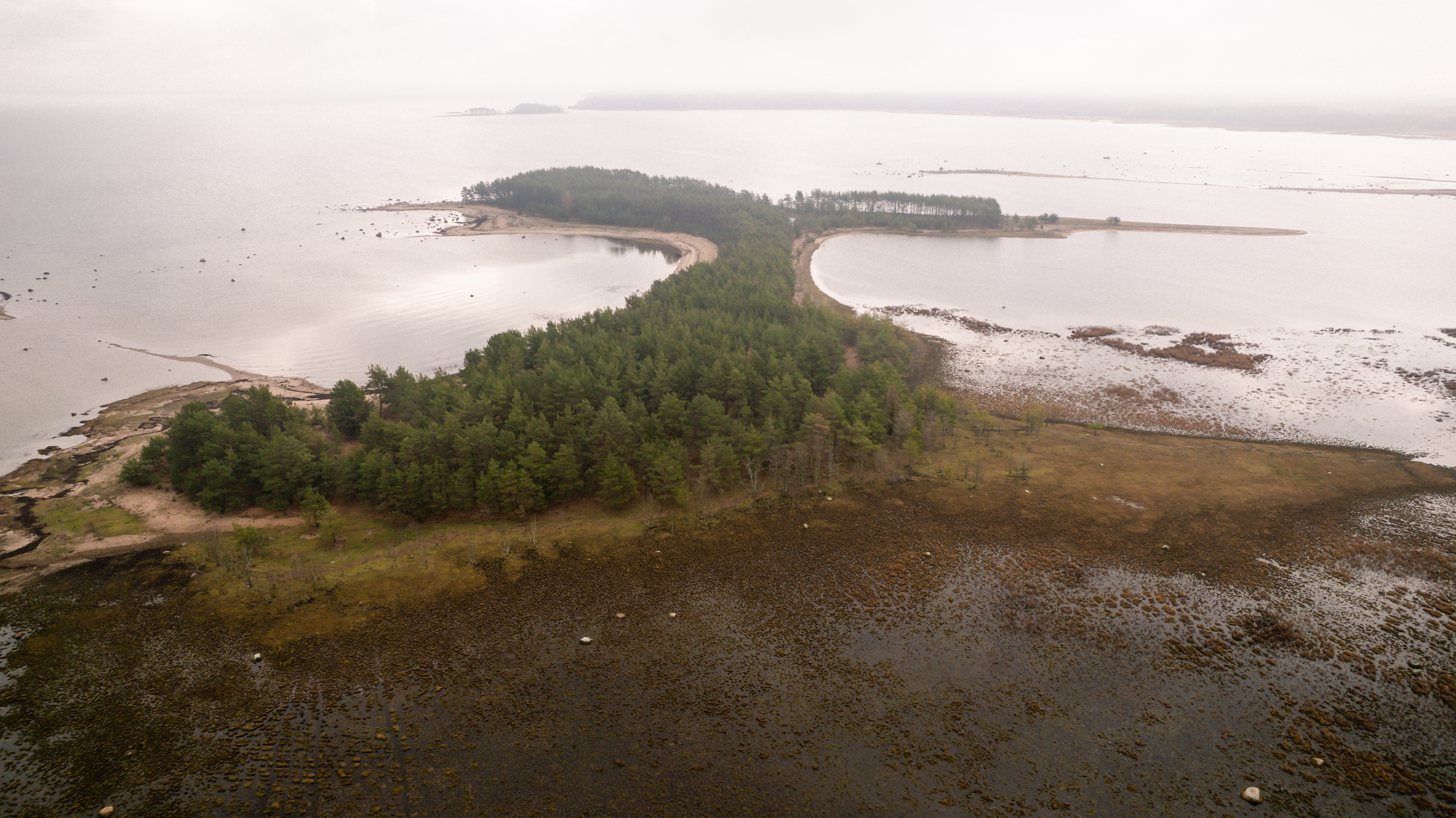
Ulkkari

Ulkkari (59.6261°N 25.9908°E) is a conservation zone in the park. It was formerly an island in Koolimäe Bay.

== Manors ==
There are four manors situated in the national park: Palmse manor, the picturesque Vihula manor, Kolga manor, and the baroque Sagadi Manor, Estonia's most visited manor which together with the other three comprise one of the most unusual group of manors in the country.

== Gallery ==
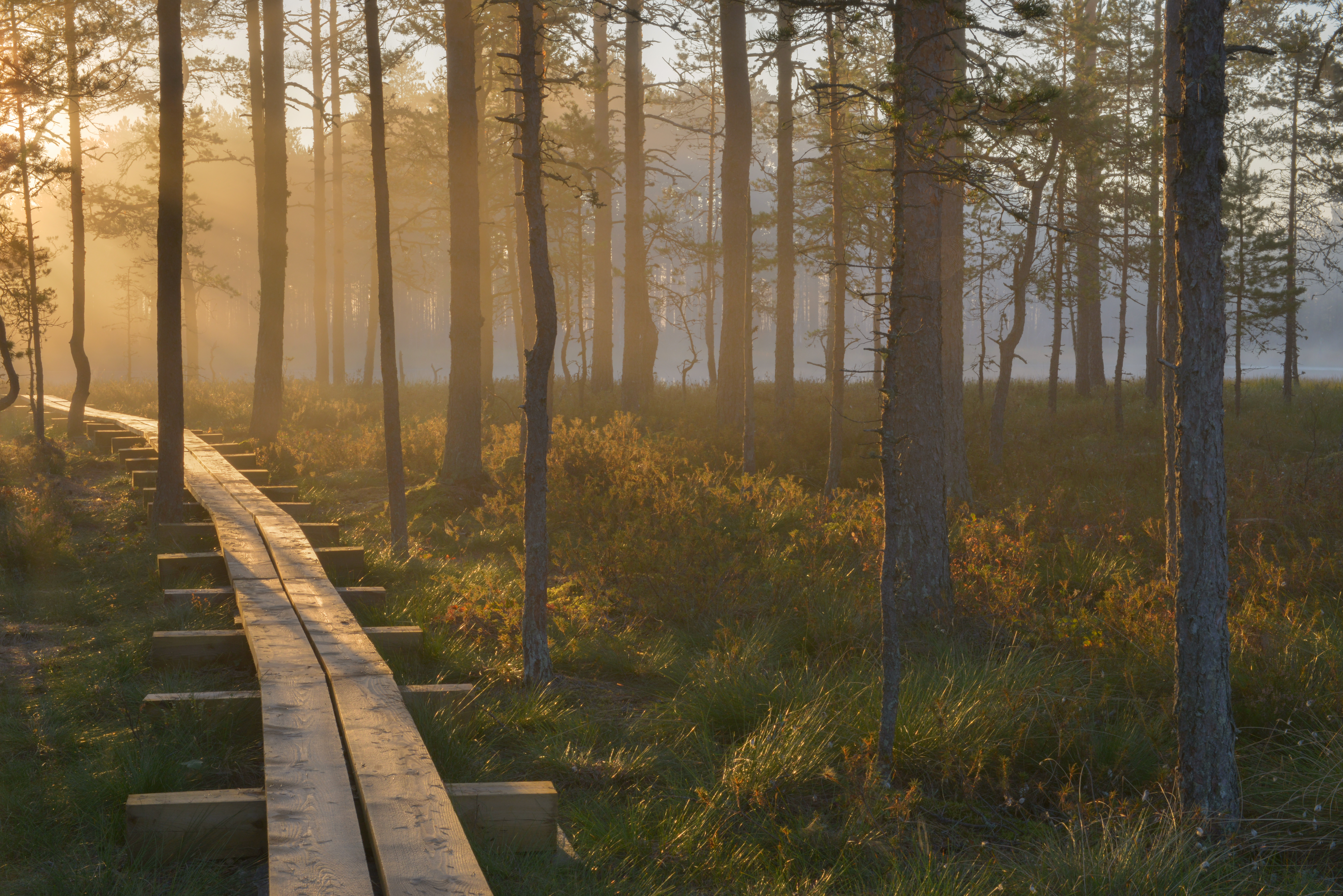
Wooden walkway near the bog

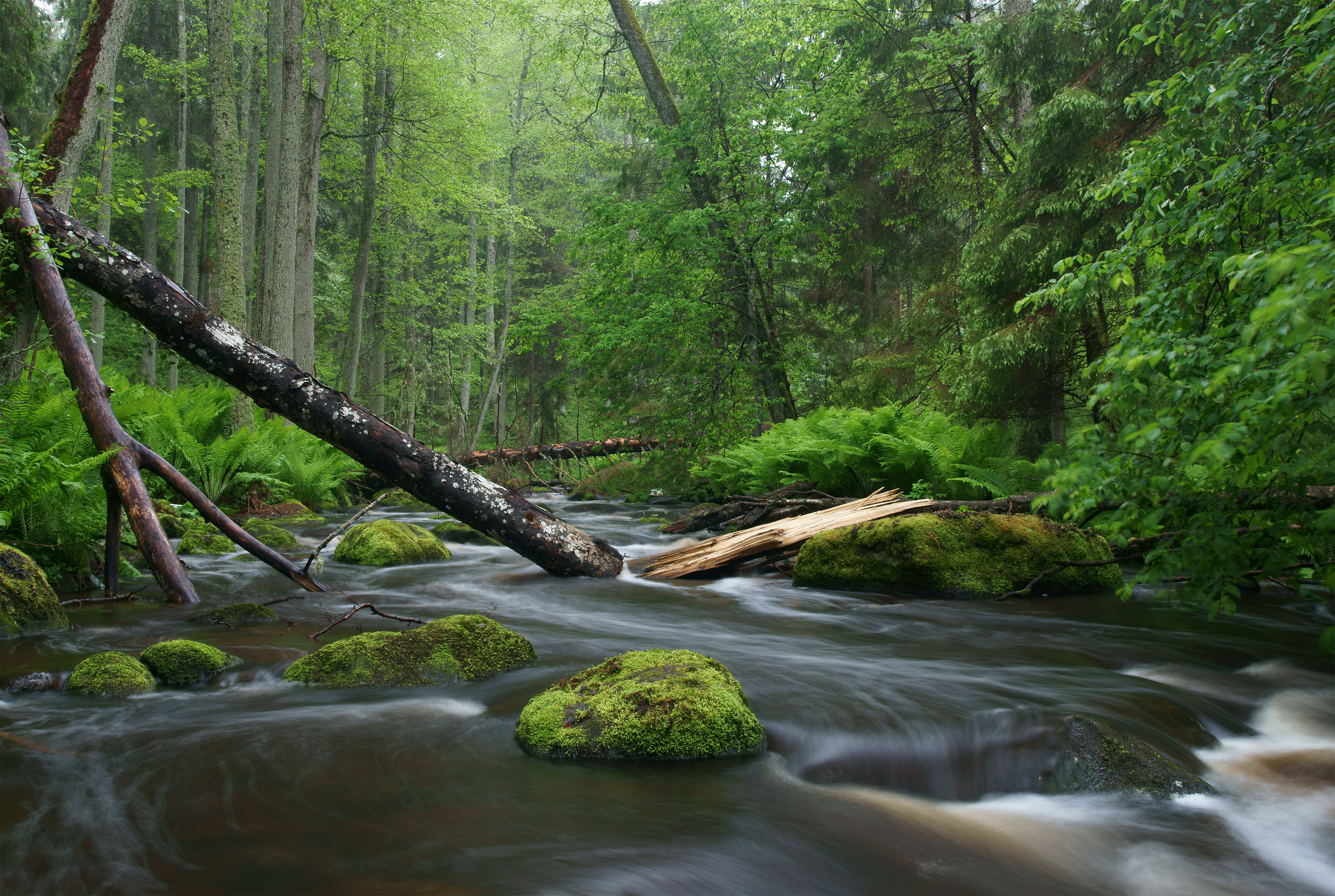
The Altja River

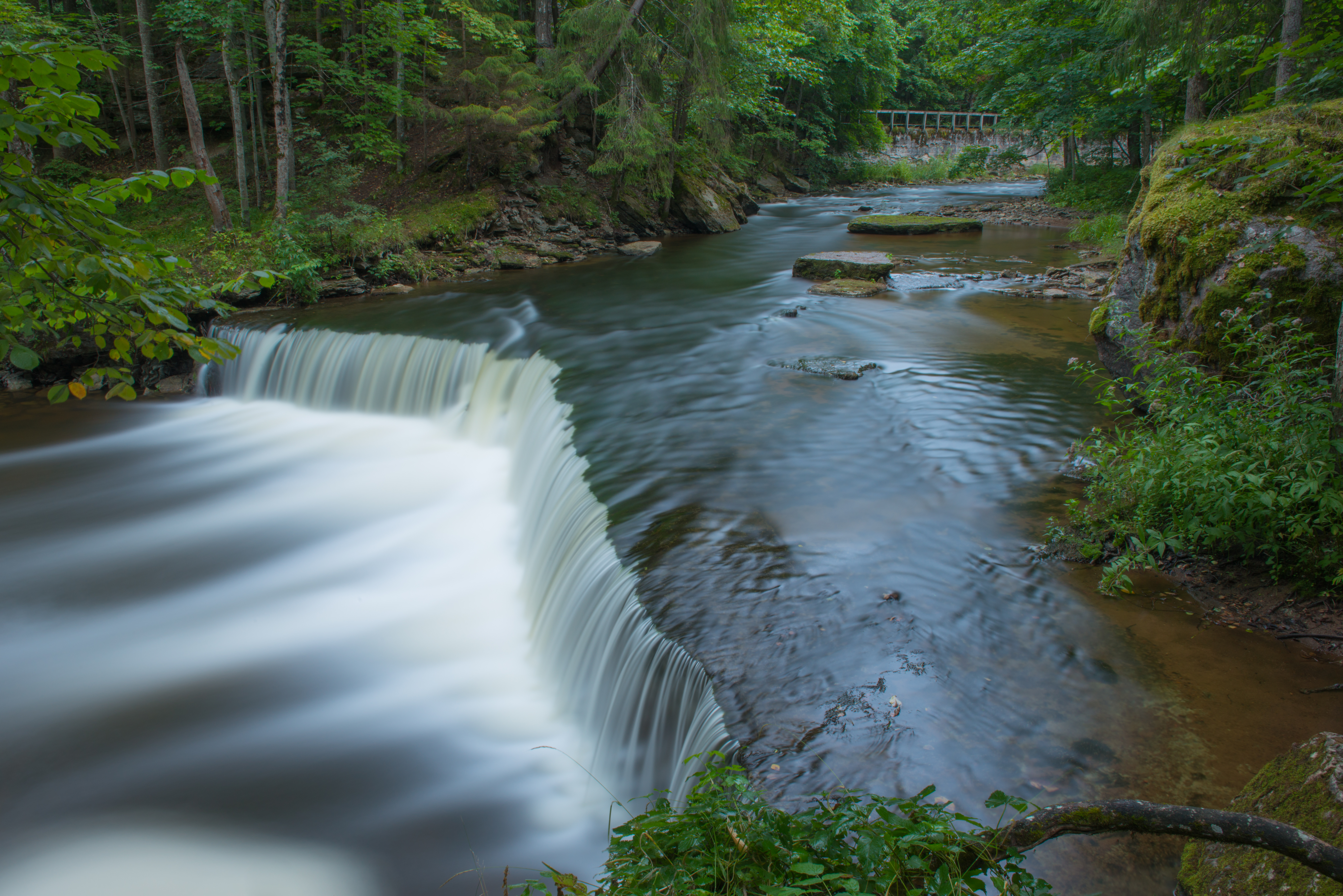
Nõmmeveski Falls

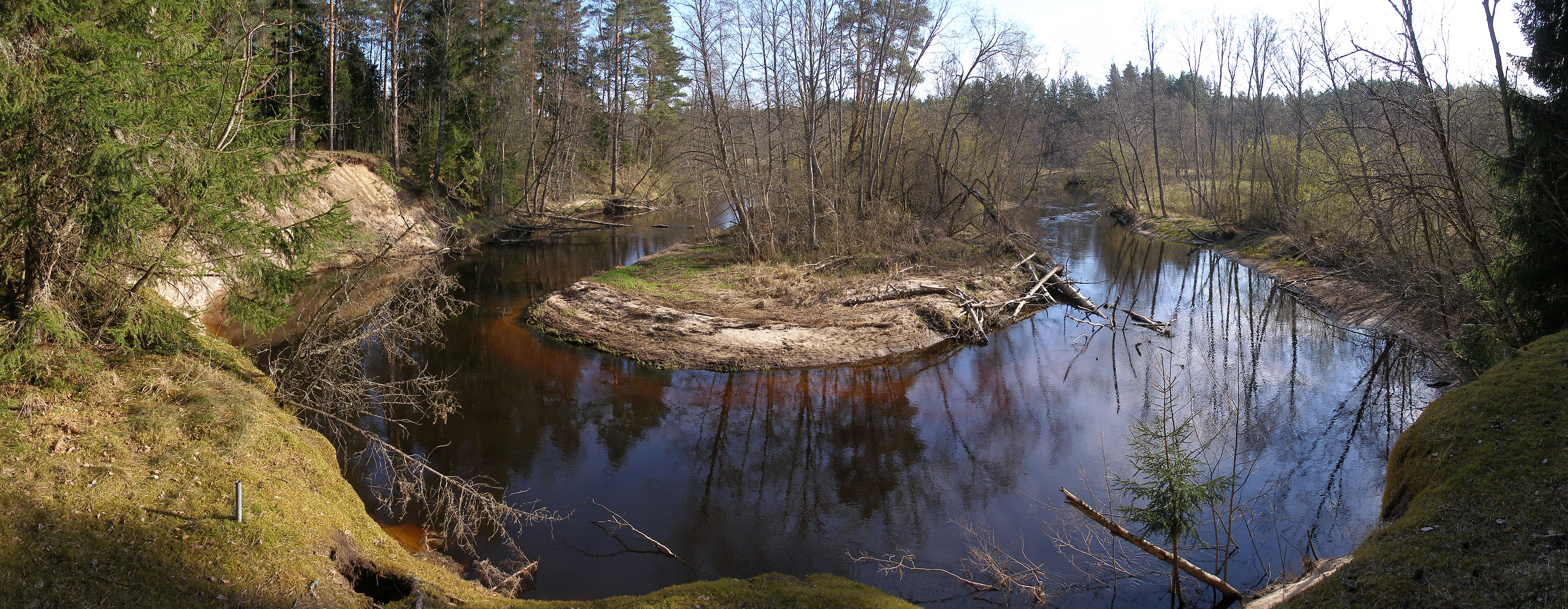
The Valgejõgi River

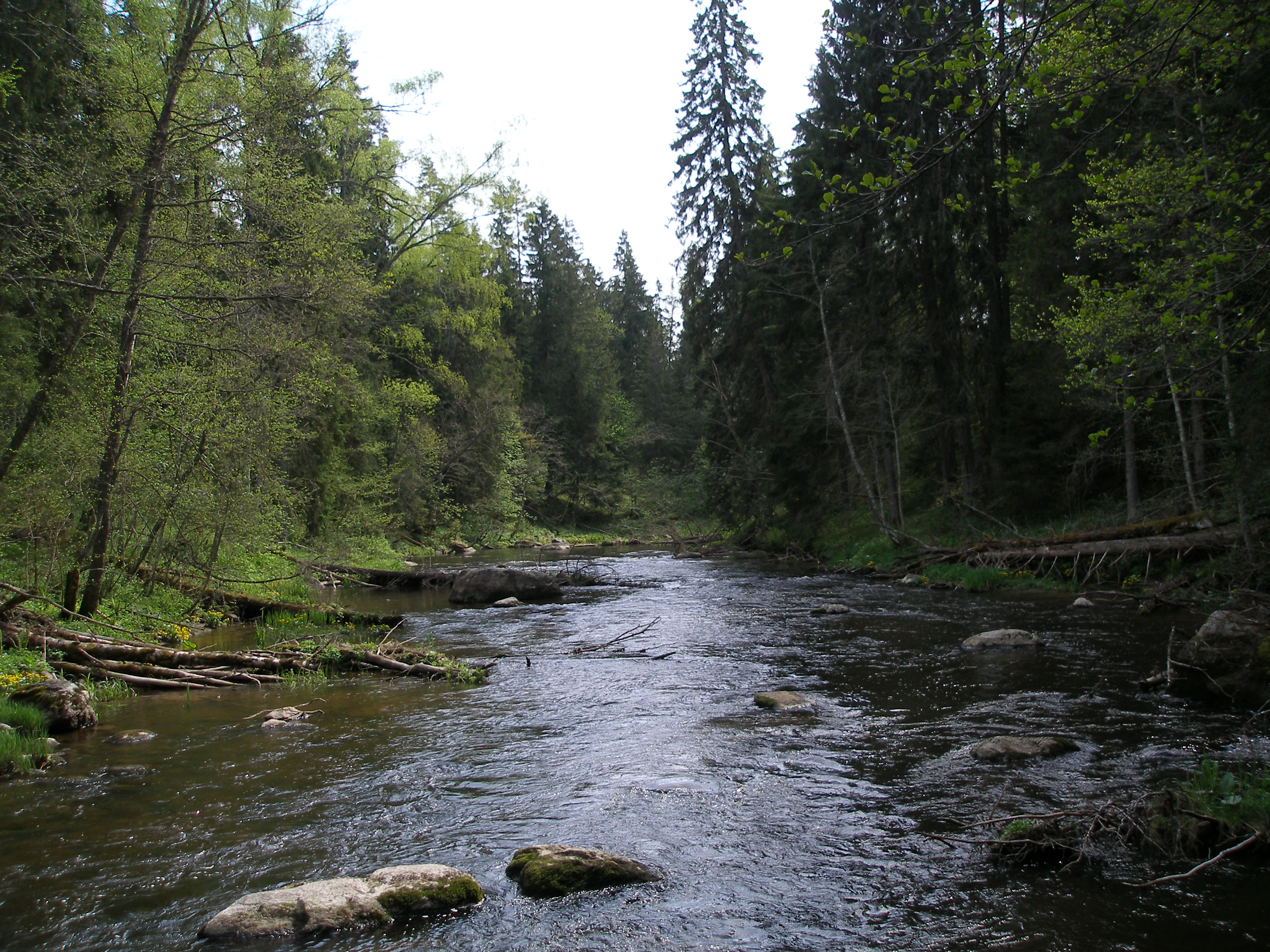
The Loobu River near Porgaste

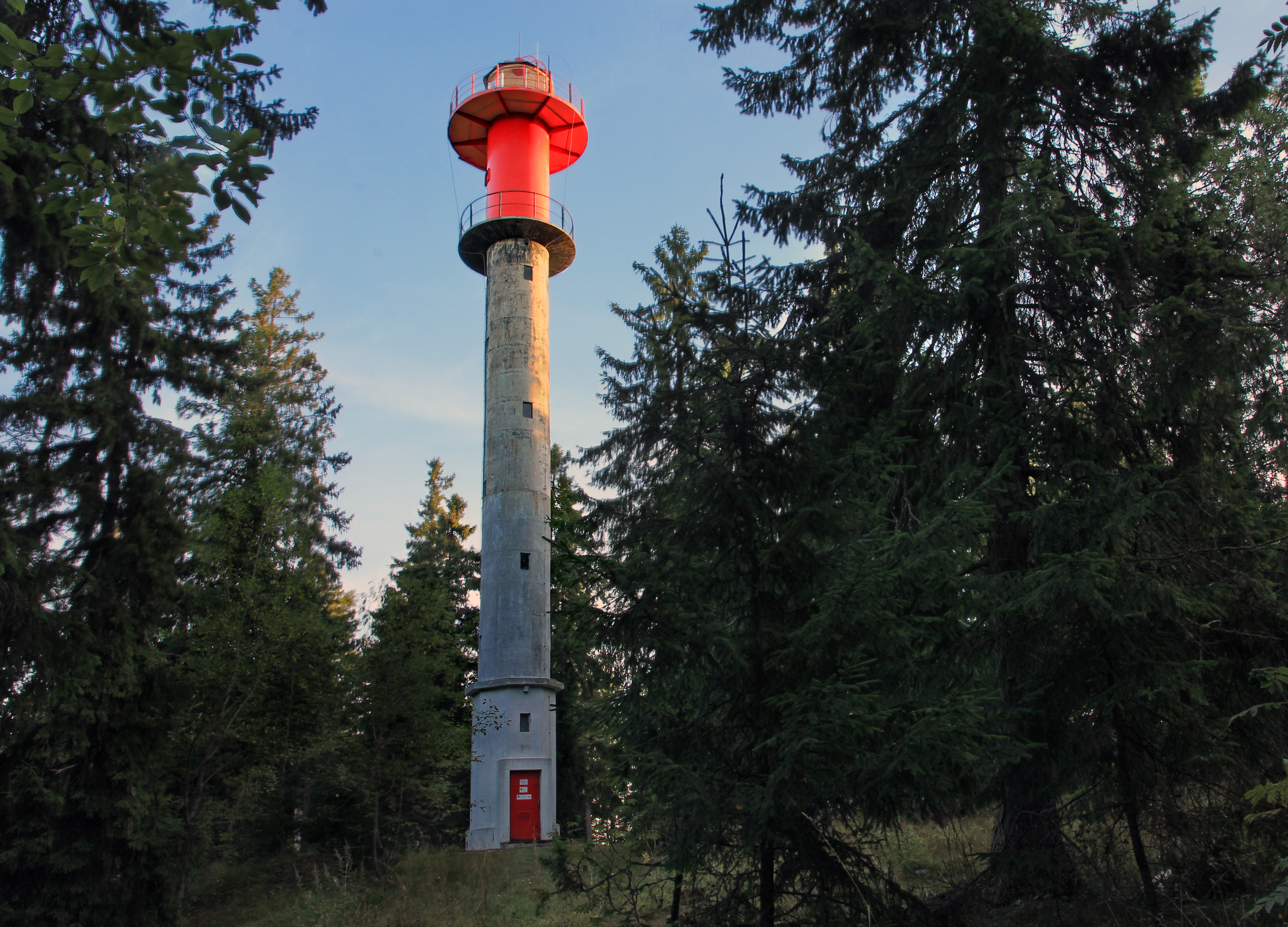
Juminda lighthouse

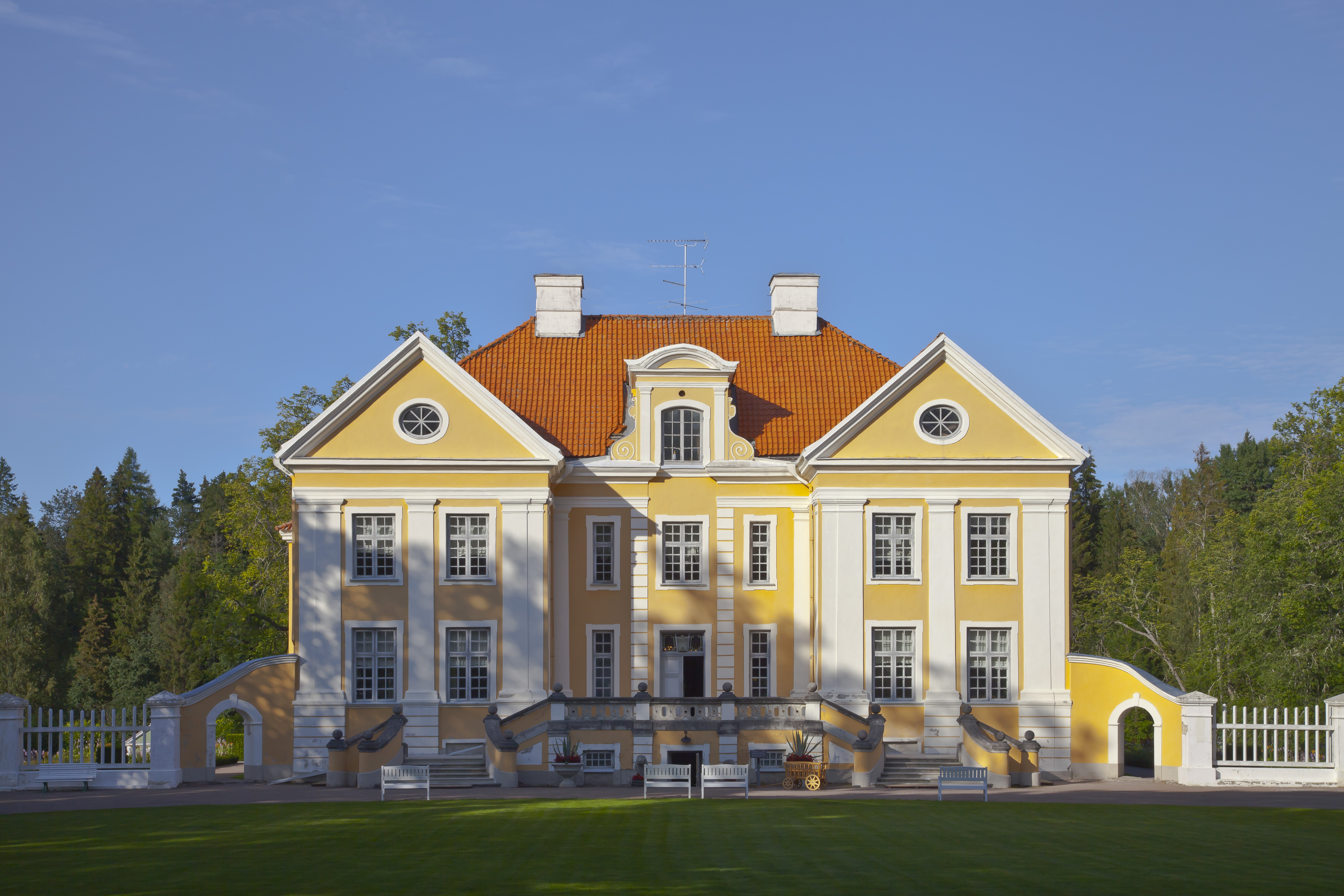
Palmse Manor

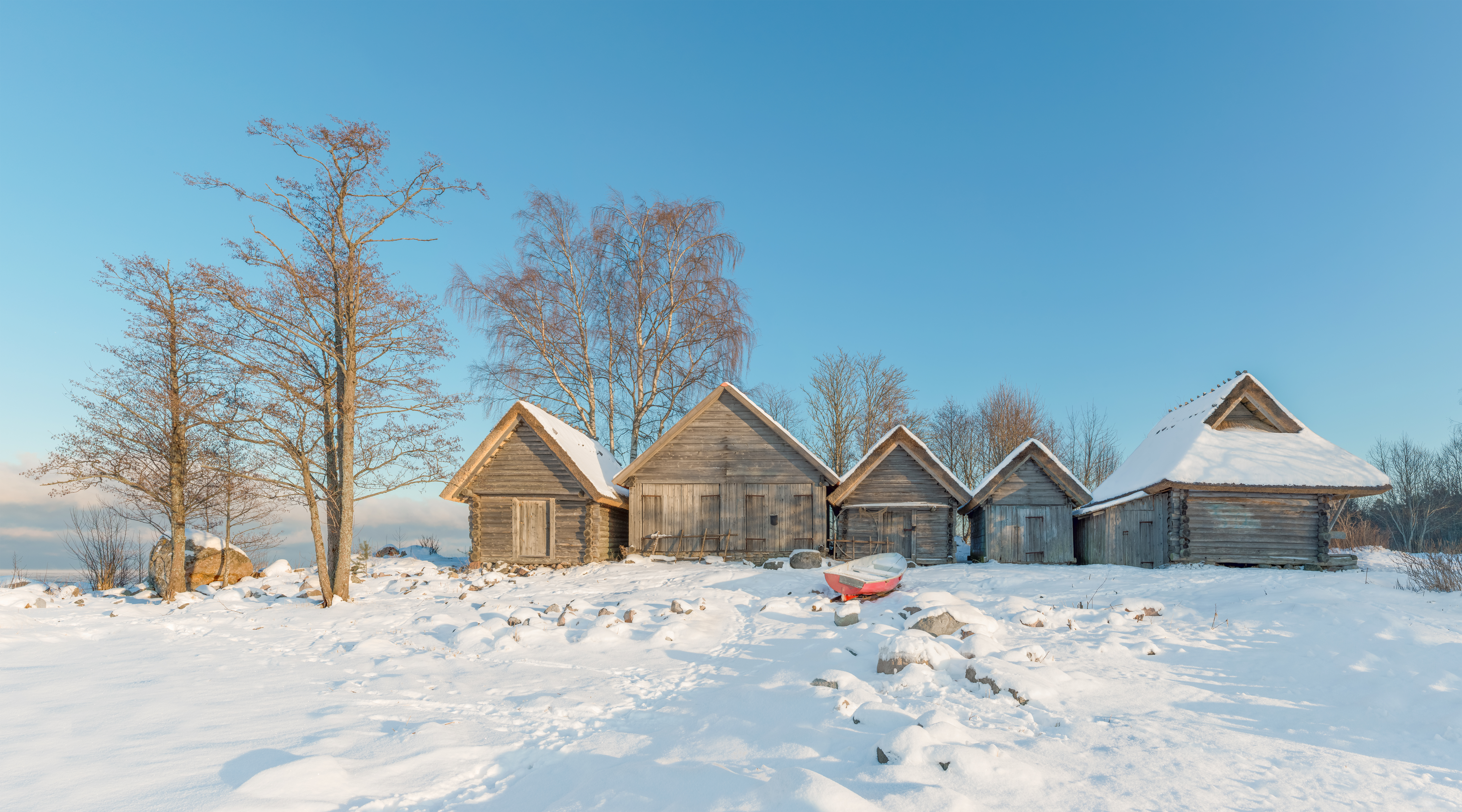
Fishermen's huts by the sea in the fishing village of Altja

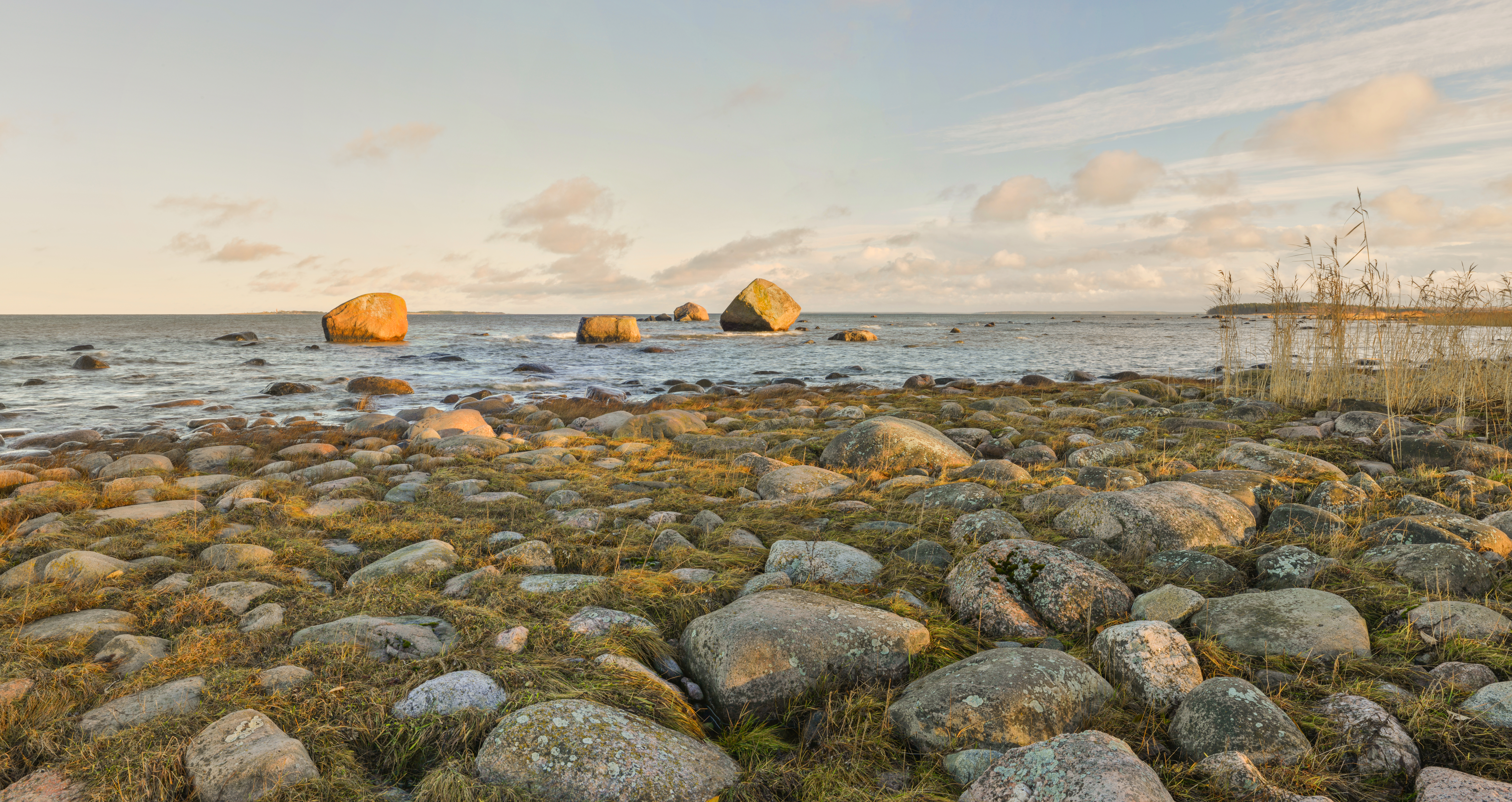
Glacial boulders on the Pärispea Peninsula

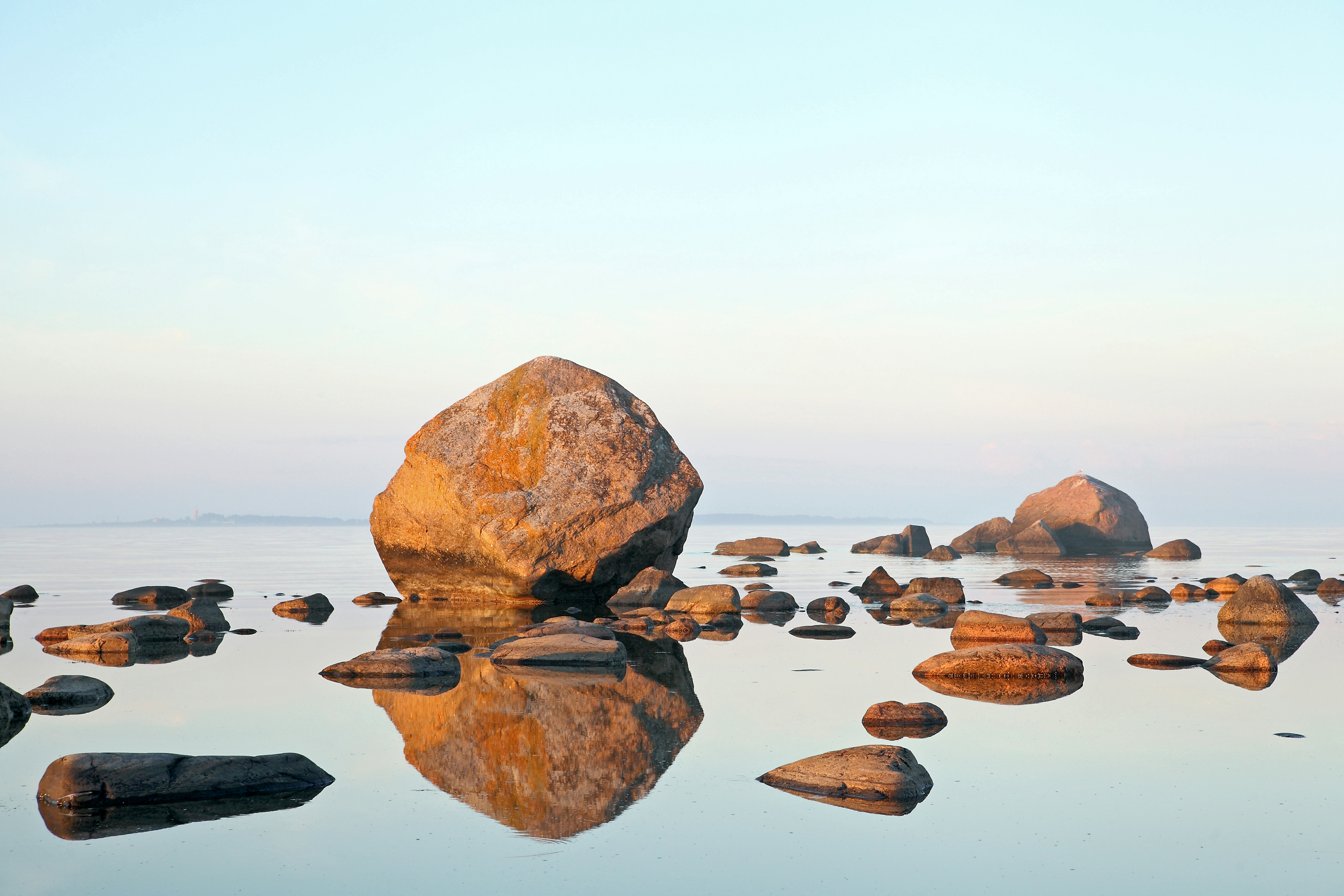
Glacial boulders with Mohni island in the skyline

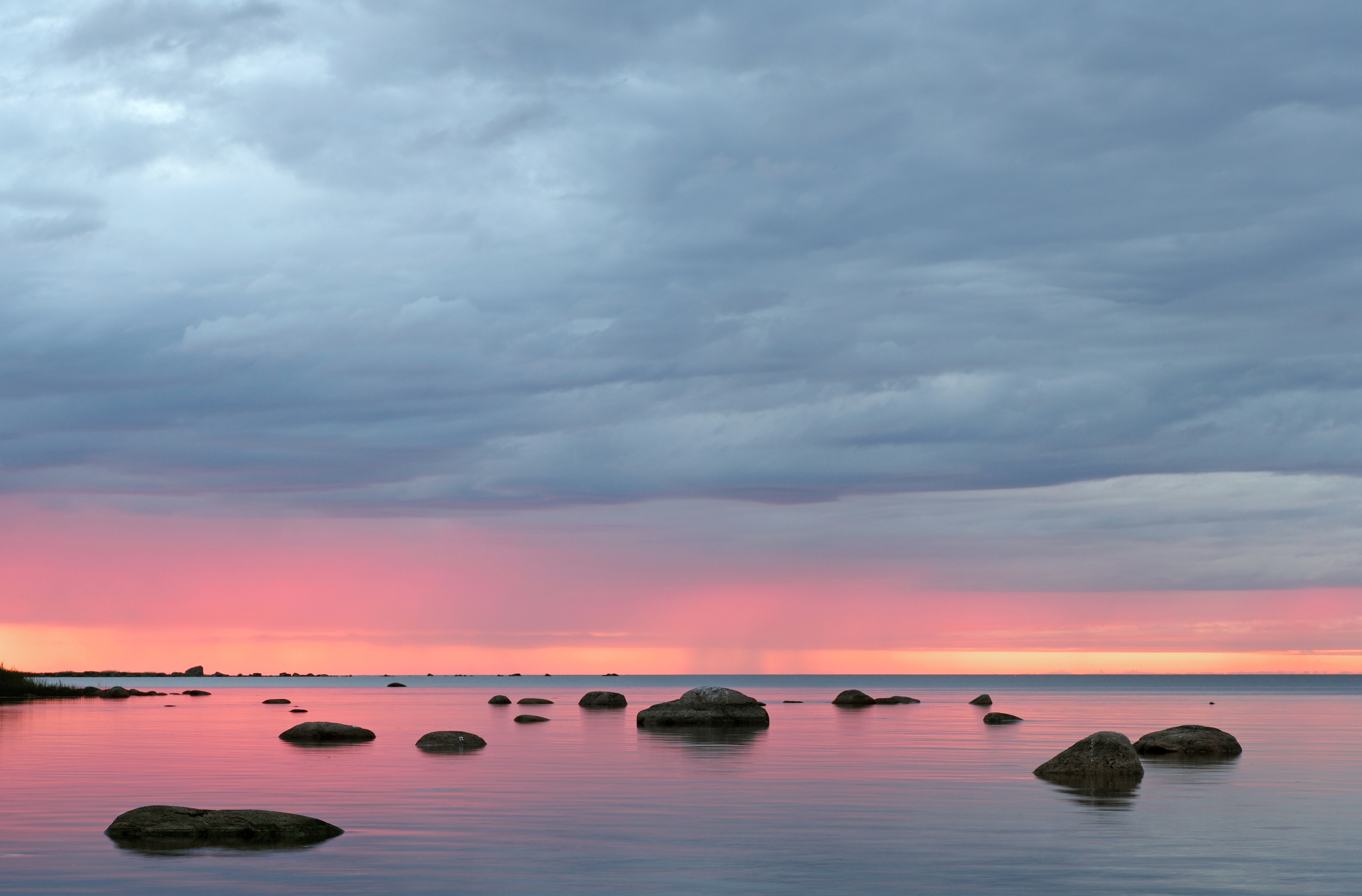
Hauaneeme Bay in the village of Pärispea

== See also ==
- Protected areas of Estonia
- List of national parks in the Baltics
- List of islands of Estonia
