= Bogatkin =

Bogatkin (Russian: Богаткин) is a surname of Russian origin. Notable people with the surname include:

- Georg Bogatkin (born 1954), Estonian ceramicist
- Vladimir Bogatkin (1922–1971), Russian artist
- Mari Uusküla (née Bogatkin, born 1980), Estonian linguist
