= Oskar Seliaru =

Estonian actor, director, and puppeteer (1906–1978)

- Born: Oskar Leenart Schelbach; June 18, 1906; Rakvere, Estonia
- Died: June 14, 1978 (aged 71); New York City
- Resting place: Woodlawn Cemetery (Lakewood Township, New Jersey)
- Occupations: Actor, director, and puppeteer
- Spouse: Lo Tui

Oskar Leenart Seliaru (born Oskar Leenart Schelbach; June 18, 1906 – June 14, 1978 New York) was an Estonian actor, director, and puppeteer.

== Early life and education ==
Oskar Seliaru was born in Rakvere, Estonia, the son of Jüri Schelbach (later Seliaru, 1875–1944) and Marie Schelbach (later Seliaru, née Vilu, 1875–?). He attended at Rakvere High School, and he participated in the Estonian War of Independence as a schoolboy. In his youth he was also engaged in journalism and was an athlete (shooting and equestrianism).

== Career ==
Seliaru started performing on the stage in 1926 in the Rakvere Actors' Circle, and he was an actor at the Drama Theater from 1936 to 1944, where he directed a puppet troupe and a was a puppet technician.

In 1944, he fled to Germany. He founded the puppet troupe Sel's Marionettes (Estonian: Seli marionetid) there, and he performed from 1945 to 1950 with his own puppet plays, including See oli unenägu (It Was a Dream) and Seitse ühe hoobiga (Seven in One Blow). He relocated to New York in 1950 and directed and acted at the New York Estonian Theater.

== Productions ==
- 1943: Pöialpoiss (The Dwarf) by Anna Brigadere
- 1944: Haldjas Kastetilk (The Fairy Dewdrop) by Lo Tui
- 1952: Mees merelt (The Man from the Sea) by August Mälk
- 1955: Püve talus (At the Püve Farm) by August Kitzberg
- 1960: Mikumärdi by Hugo Raudsepp
- 1963: Oskar Lutsu õhtu (An Evening of Oskar Luts)

== Roles ==
- 1936: Tölpa in Nukitsamees (Bumpy) by Oskar Luts
- 1937: The Wolf in Pauka by Aadu Laabus
- 1938: Erik Sture in Erik XIV by August Strindberg
- 1940: Napoleon in Bóg wojny (The God of War, Estonian title: Tseesar ja inimene) by Adolf Nowaczyński
- 1942: Baron Lövenborg in Gösta Berling's Saga by Selma Lagerlöf
- 1952: Kapral in Tagahoovis (In the Back Yard) by Oskar Luts, adapted by Andres Särev
- 1952: Laas Räimes in Mees merelt (The Man from the Sea) by August Mälk
- 1960: Jüri Tomusk in Mikumärdi by Hugo Raudsepp

== Family ==
Seliaru became engaged to the Estonian actress, director, and costume designer Lo Tui in February 1937, and they were married in Tallinn on May 1, 1937. Oskar Seliaru erroneously sought to have Lo Tui declared legally dead in 1951 because he believed that she had been killed during the Soviet re-occupation of the Baltic states in 1944.
