= Taniloo =

Taniloo is an Estonian surname. Notable people with the surname include:

- Endel Taniloo (1923–2019), Estonian sculptor
- Kadi Taniloo (1911–1998), Estonian actress
