= Valgjärv (Rõuge) =

Lake in Estonia

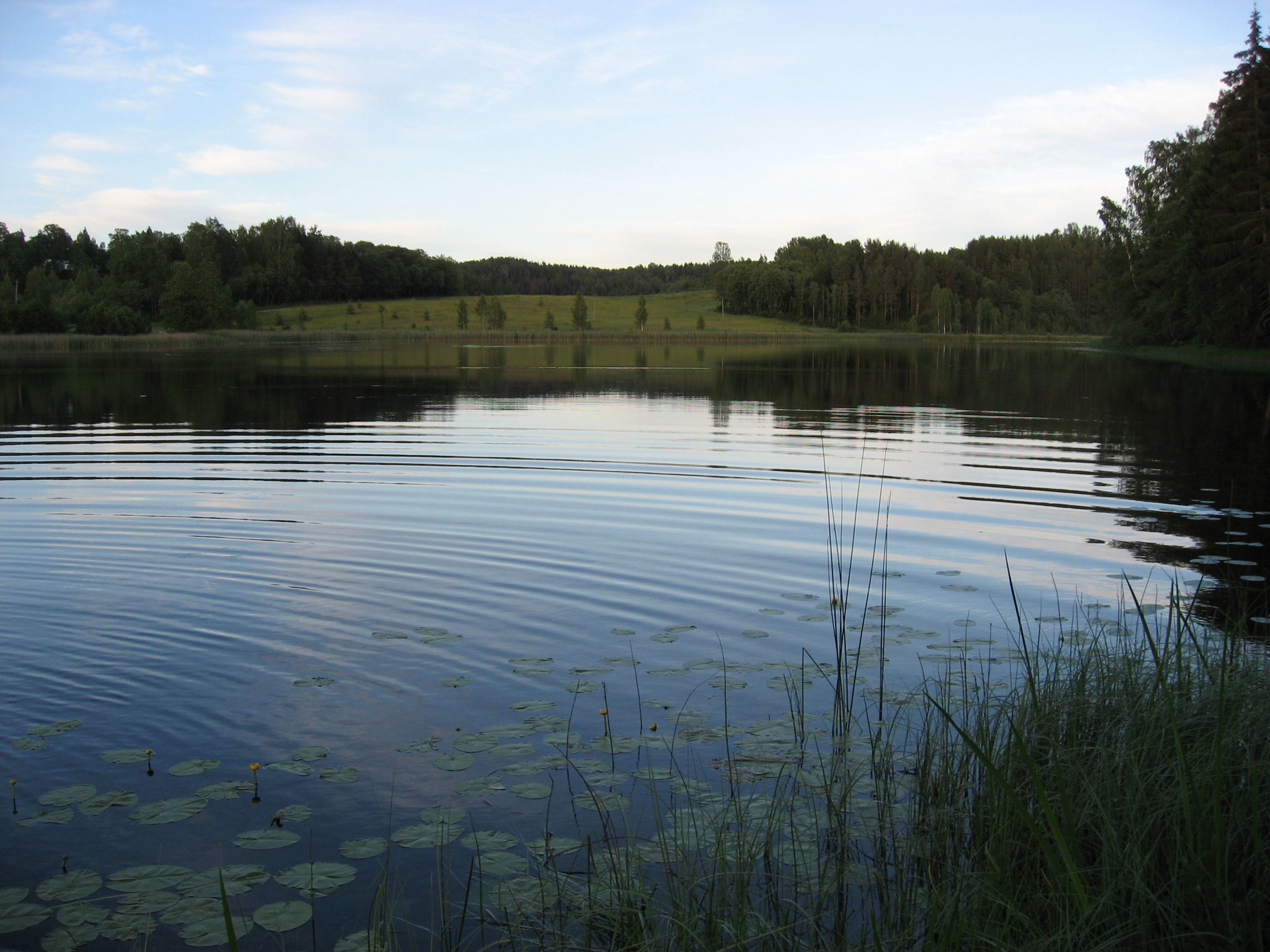

- Location within Estonia
- Location: Võru County
- Coordinates: 57°43′26″N 26°55′53″E
- Basin countries: Estonia
- Max. length: 500 meters (1,600 ft)
- Surface area: 5.2 hectares (13 acres)
- Average depth: 4.9 meters (16 ft)
- Max. depth: 13.5 meters (44 ft)
- Water volume: 287,000 cubic meters (10,100,000 cu ft)
- Shore length^{1}: 1,250 meters (4,100 ft)
- Surface elevation: 116.9 meters (384 ft)
- ^{1} Shore length is not a well-defined measure.

Valgjärv (also Rõuge Valgjärv or Jaanipeebu järv) is a lake in southeastern Estonia, close to the border with Latvia. It is located in the settlement of Rõuge in Rõuge Parish, Võru County.

== Physical description ==
The lake has an area of 5.2 hectares (13 acres). The lake has an average depth of 4.9 meters (16 ft) and a maximum depth of 13.5 meters (44 ft). It is 500 meters (1,600 ft) long, and its shoreline measures 1,250 meters (4,100 ft). It has a volume of 287,000 cubic meters (10,100,000 cu ft).

== Names ==
The name Valgjärv (lit. 'white lake') is a common designation for lakes in Estonia (compare also the similar Finnish hydronym Valkeajärvi). The naming motivation is considered to be clear water with a shallow light sandy bottom in some areas of the lake. Some lakes named Valgjärv may also have been named to contrast with neighboring lakes called Mustjärv (lit. 'black lake'). The variant name Rõuge Valgjärv, referring to the settlement of Rõuge where the lake is lovated, disinguishes the lake from other Estonian lakes named Valgjärv. The alternate name Jaanipeebu 'Lake Jaanipeebu' refers to the village of Jaanipeebu, which borders the lake to the southwest.

== History ==
According to local information, a Soviet aircraft was hidden in the lake, dating from the Second World War. In 2002, a diving expedition to the indicated spot on the lake bottom found the cockpit and part of the fuselage at a depth of 11.8 meters (39 ft) meters. The fuselage was missing the wings and the rear part, which were not found.

== See also ==
- List of lakes of Estonia
