= Pappjärv =

Lake in Estonia

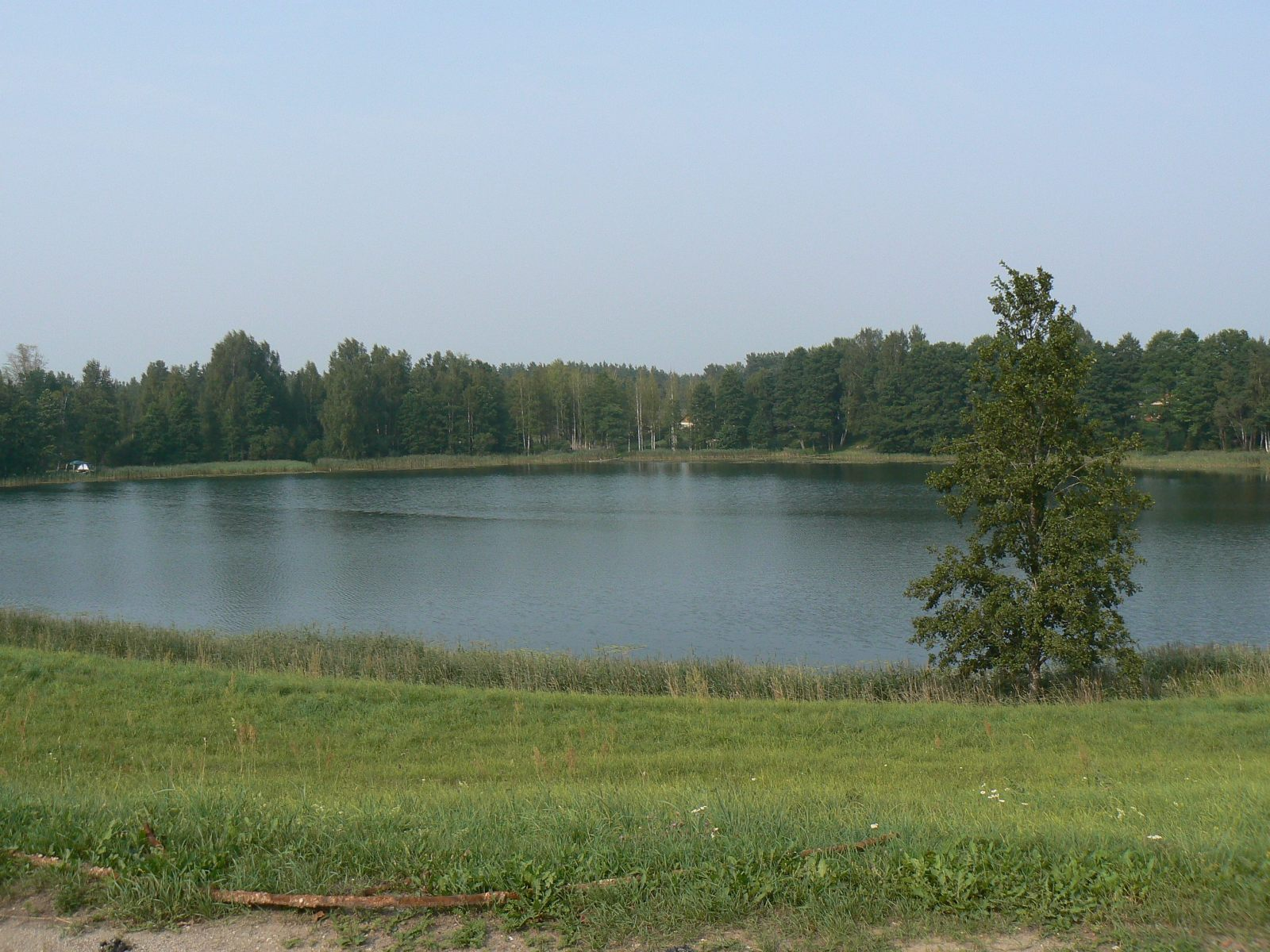

- Location within Estonia
- Coordinates: 57.8167717°N 27.0318439°E
- Basin countries: Estonia
- Max. length: 380 meters (1,250 ft)
- Surface area: 5.3 hectares (13 acres)
- Average depth: 6.1 meters (20 ft)
- Max. depth: 16.6 meters (54 ft)
- Water volume: 316,000 cubic meters (11,200,000 cu ft)
- Shore length^{1}: 1,000 meters (3,300 ft)
- Surface elevation: 81.3 meters (267 ft)
- ^{1} Shore length is not a well-defined measure.

Pappjärv is a lake in Estonia. It is located in the settlement of Kose in Võru Parish, Võru County.

== Physical description ==
The lake has an area of 5.3 hectares (13 acres). The lake has an average depth of 6.1 meters (20 ft) and a maximum depth of 16.6 meters (54 ft). It is 380 meters (1,250 ft) long, and its shoreline measures 1,000 meters (3,300 ft). It has a volume of 316,000 cubic meters (11,200,000 cu ft).

== See also ==
- List of lakes of Estonia
