= Haki, Estonia =

Village in Estonia

- Village
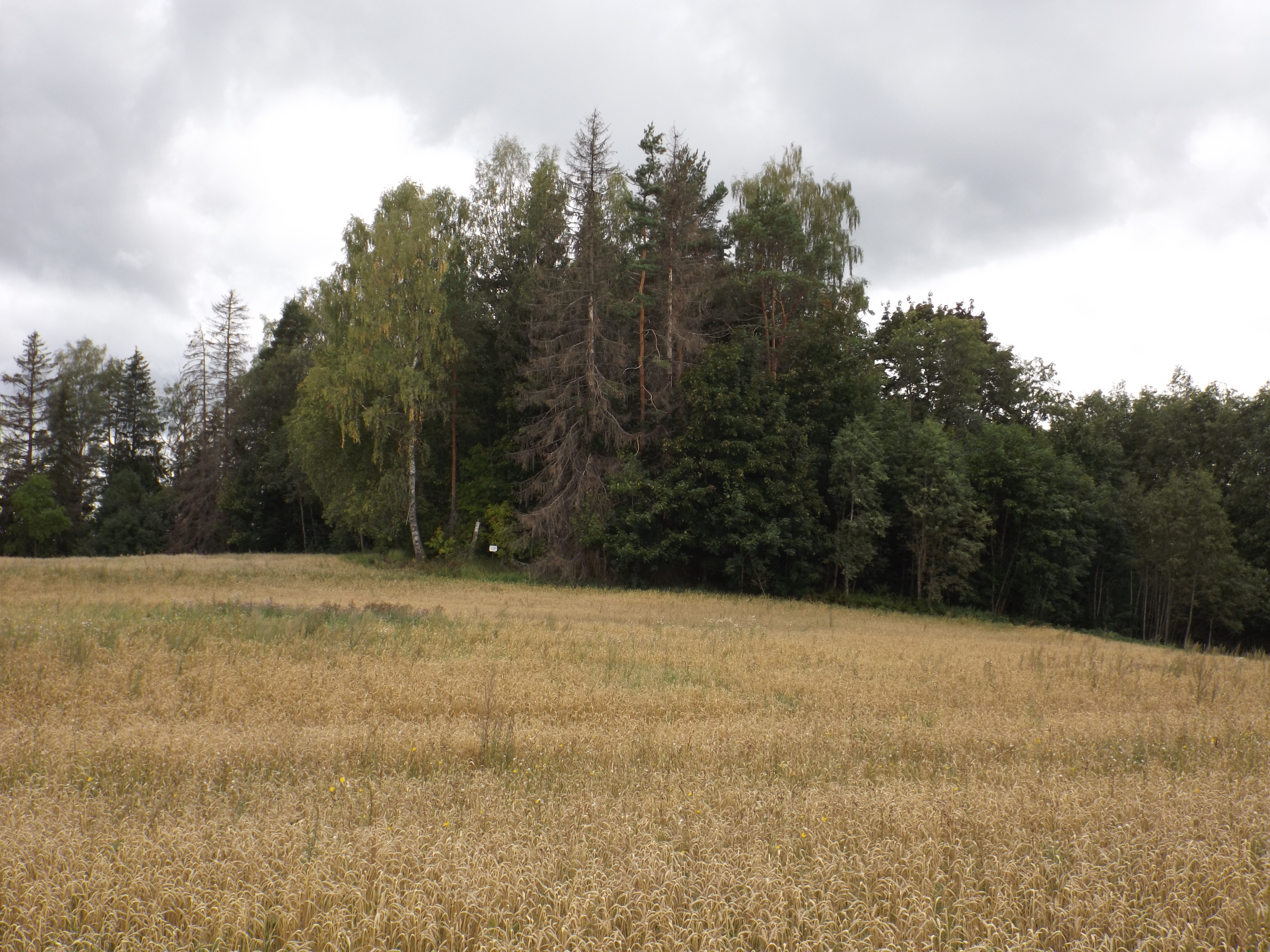
- Kuntsamägi (2023)

- Location within Estonia
- Country: Estonia
- County: Võru
- Parish: Rõuge

Population (2011)
  - Total: 1
- Time zone: UTC+2 (EET)
  - Summer (DST): UTC+3 (EEST)

Haki is a village in Rõuge Parish, Võru County in Estonia. The population has been 7 since 2021.
