= Liinjärv =

Lake in Estonia

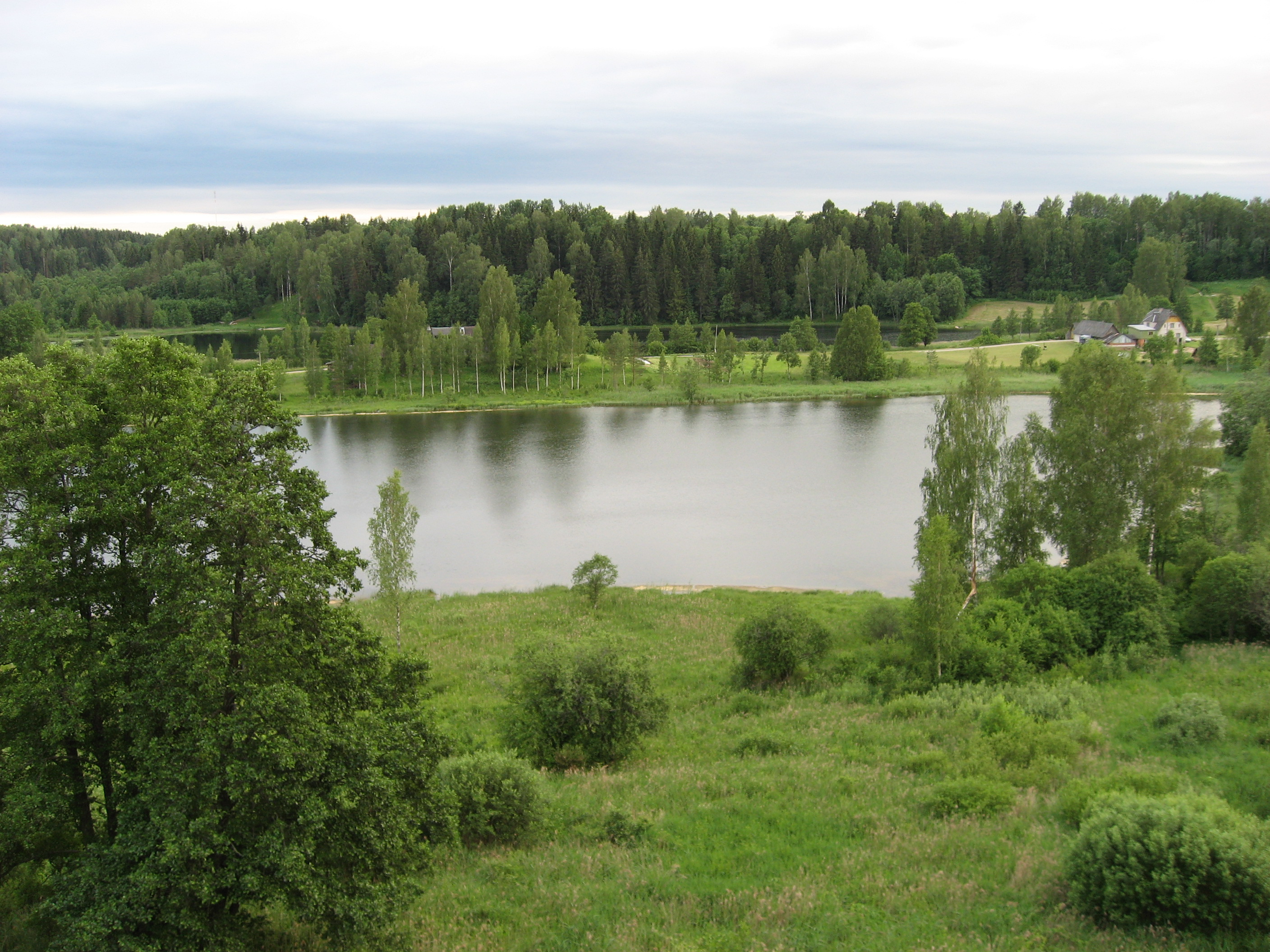

- Location within Estonia
- Location: Voru County
- Coordinates: 57.7261121°N 26.9323569°E
- Basin countries: Estonia
- Max. length: 370 meters (1,210 ft)
- Surface area: 3.5 hectares (8.6 acres)
- Average depth: 5.3 meters (17 ft)
- Max. depth: 11.5 meters (38 ft)
- Water volume: 210,000 cubic meters (7,400,000 cu ft)
- Shore length^{1}: 1,000 meters (3,300 ft)
- Surface elevation: 116.4 meters (382 ft)
- ^{1} Shore length is not a well-defined measure.

Liinjärv is a lake in Estonia. It is located in the settlement of Rõuge in Rõuge Parish, Võru County, close to the border with Latvia.

== Physical description ==
The lake has an area of 3.5 hectares (8.6 acres). The lake has an average depth of 5.3 meters (17 ft) and a maximum depth of 11.5 meters (38 ft). It is 370 meters (1,210 ft) long, and its shoreline measures 1,000 meters (3,300 ft). It has a volume of 210,000 cubic meters (7,400,000 cu ft).

== See also ==
- List of lakes of Estonia
