= Valgjärv (Kose) =

Lake in Estonia

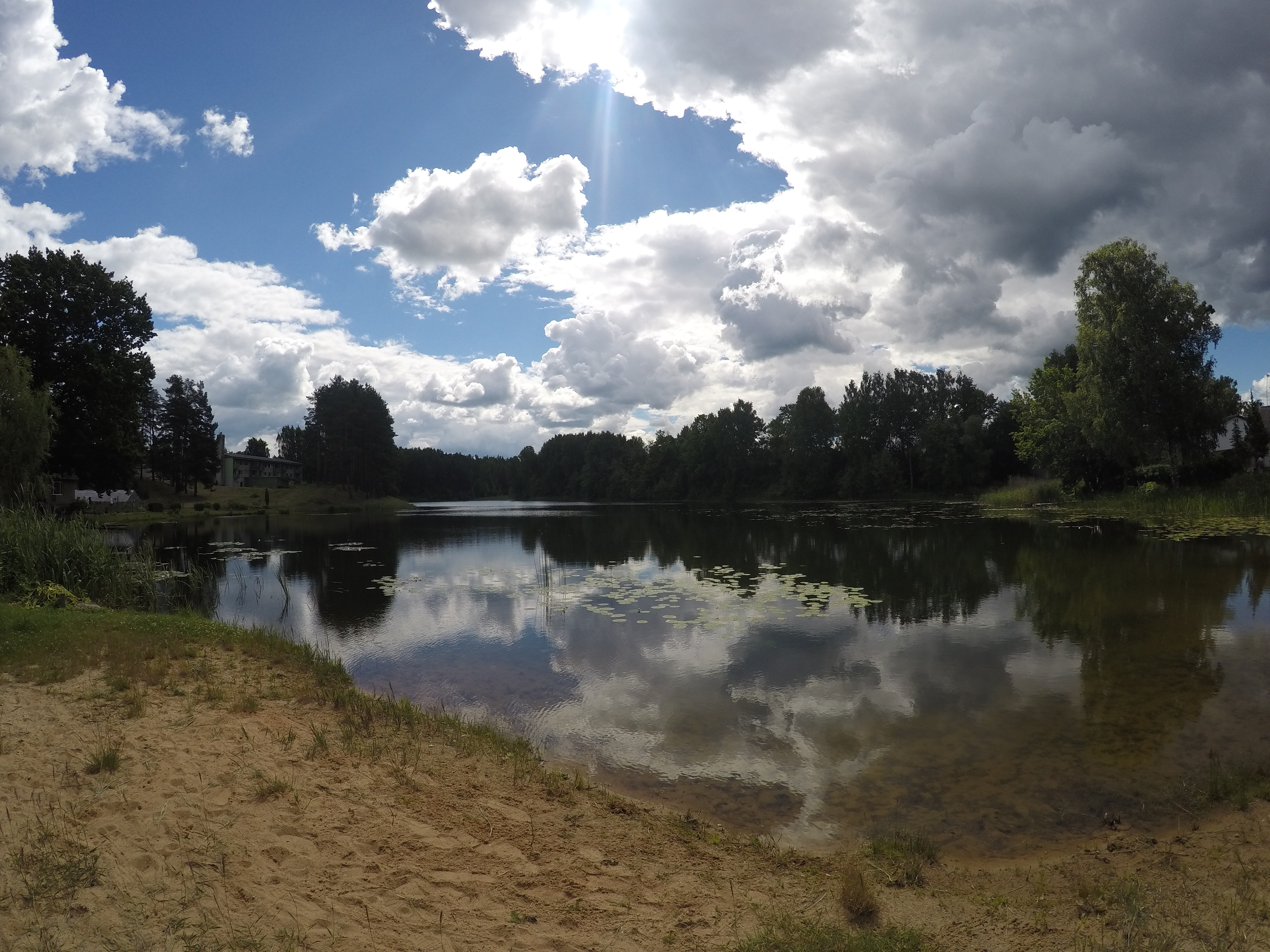
- Valgjärv from the north bank, 2017

- Location within Estonia
- Coordinates: 57°48′44″N 27°02′21″E
- Basin countries: Estonia
- Max. length: 420 meters (1,380 ft)
- Surface area: 3.6 hectares (8.9 acres)
- Average depth: 3.8 meters (12 ft)
- Max. depth: 9.3 meters (31 ft)
- Water volume: 121,000 cubic meters (4,300,000 cu ft)
- Shore length^{1}: 980 meters (3,220 ft)
- Surface elevation: 89.1 meters (292 ft)
- ^{1} Shore length is not a well-defined measure.

Valgjärv (also Kasaritsa Valgjärv, Jaani järv, or Võru Valgjärv) is a lake in Estonia. It is located in the settlement of Kose in Võru Parish, Võru County.

== Physical description ==
The lake has an area of 3.6 hectares (8.9 acres). The lake has an average depth of 3.8 meters (12 ft) and a maximum depth of 9.3 meters (31 ft). It is 420 meters (1,380 ft) long, and its shoreline measures 980 meters (3,220 ft). It has a volume of 121,000 cubic meters (4,300,000 cu ft).

== Names ==
The name Valgjärv (lit. 'white lake') is a common designation for lakes in Estonia (compare also the similar Finnish hydronym Valkeajärvi). The naming motivation is considered to be clear water with a shallow light sandy bottom in some areas of the lake. Some lakes named Valgjärv may also have been named to contrast with neighboring lakes called Mustjärv (lit. 'black lake'). The variant names Kasaritsa Valgjärv and Võru Valgjärv distinguish the lake from other Estonian lakes named Valgjärv; the first refers to the territory of Kasaritsa Manor, which used to extend as far as this area, and the second refers to the town of Võru, which lies about 3.5 kilometers (2.2 mi) to the northwest. The alternate name Jaani järv literally means 'John's lake'.

== See also ==
- List of lakes of Estonia
