= Karepa =

Village in Estonia

Coordinates: 59°32′N 26°25′E

- Village
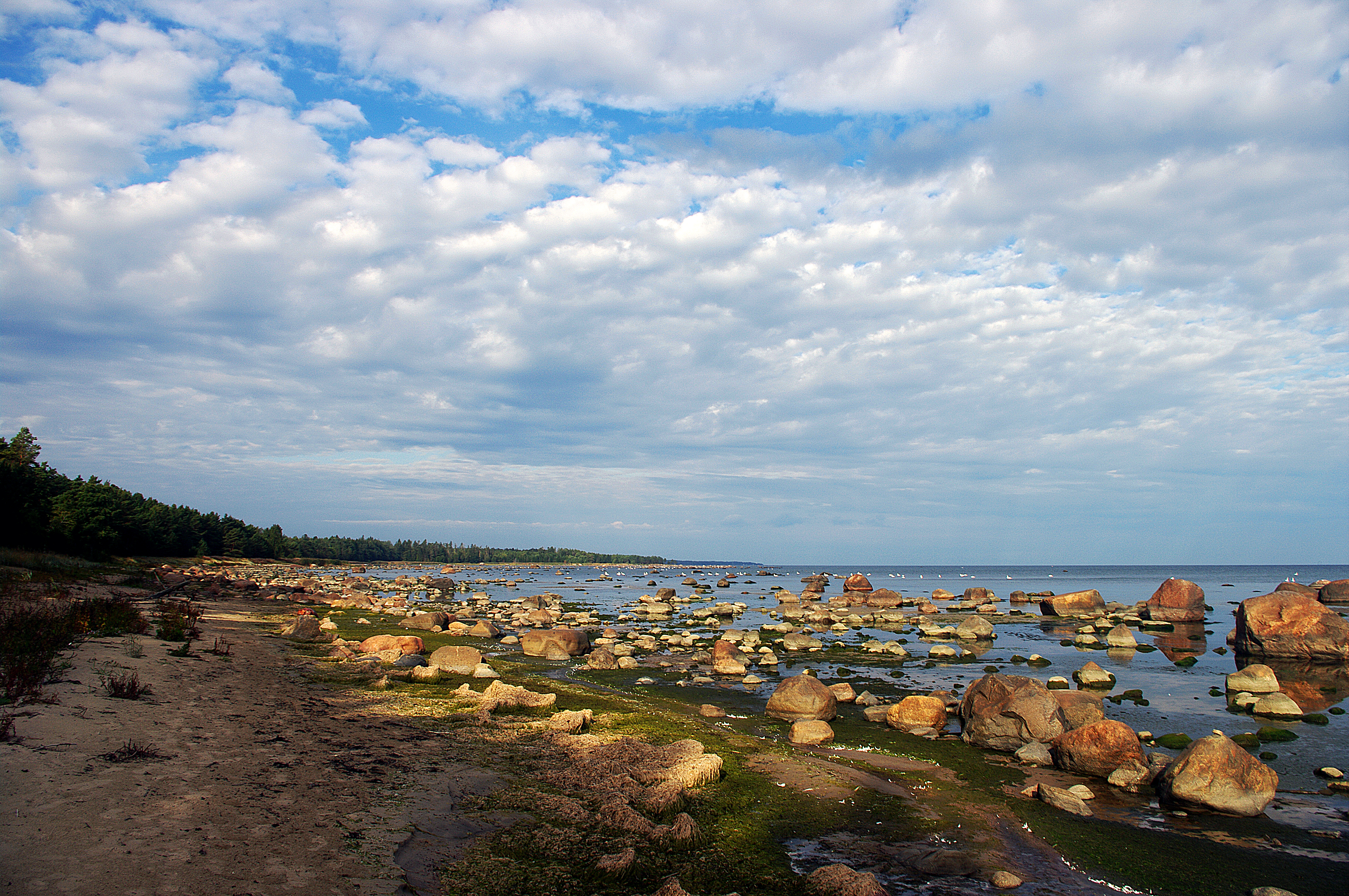
- Interactive map of Karepa
- Country: Estonia
- County: Lääne-Viru County
- Parish: Haljala Parish
- Time zone: UTC+2 (EET)
  - Summer (DST): UTC+3 (EEST)

Karepa is a village in Haljala Parish, Lääne-Viru County, in northeastern Estonia.

== Name ==
Karepa was attested in historical sources as Wald von Karrepso/Karlopso in 1541 (referring to the forest), Karepaeh in 1726, Karepä in 1796, and Karlpae in 1844. Enn Tarvel suggested that the name derives from the words kare 'unplowed, grassy land' plus -pa (from pea 'head(land)').

== Kalame Farm Museum ==
The Kalame Farm Museum (or Richard Sagrits Museum) is a farm museum in the village. Part of the museum's collection presents the Estonian painter Richard Sagrits. The most unique part of the museum complex is a silmuköök (a building with a stove for cooking river lampreys). The museum is part of the Virumaa Museums foundation.

== Notable people ==
- Villem Alttoa (1898–1975), literary scholar, was born in Karepa.
- Vladimir Bogatkin (1922–1971), artist, had a summer home in Karepa and depicted the landscape around Karepa in his works.
- Villem Gross (1922–2001), writer, had a summer home in Karepa.
- Valli Lember-Bogatkina (1921–2016), artist, had a summer home in Karepa.
- Richard Sagrits (1910–1968), painter, was born in Karepa. His house-museum is located in the village.
- Jaan Zimmermann (1880–1942), entrepreneur, owned the Villa Dombrovka in Karepa.
