= Kadi Taniloo =

Estonian actress, theater director, and journalist (1911–1998)

- Born: Keete Tanilov; January 25, 1911; Rõuge, Estonia
- Died: February 14, 1998 (aged 87); Tartu, Estonia
- Occupations: Actress, theater director, journalist

Kadi Taniloo-Tekkel (until 1936 Keete Tanilov; then Kadi Taniloo; from 1960 Kadi Tekkel; January 25, 1911 – February 14, 1998) was an Estonian actress, theater director, and journalist.

== Early life and education ==
Kadi Taniloo was born in Rõuge, Estonia, the daughter of Eduard Taniloo (1882–1948) and Ida-Vilhelmine Taniloo (née Vedler, 1884–1972). She graduated from Tartu Girls' High School in 1929. From 1929 to 1932 she studied English philology at the University of Tartu and, alongside that, singing at Voldemar Mettus's theater studio and with Arno Niitov. She was a member of the sorority Filiae Patriae.

== Career ==
Taniloo was an actress at the Vanemuine Theater from 1932 to 1940. She was invited to join the Vanemuine Drama Company by the theater's director, the writer August Gailit. In 1940, she moved to Tallinn, where she was an actress and singer at the Estonia Theater for four years, and in the opera choir starting in 1941. She fled to Berlin, Germany, in 1944, with the Great Flight. From 1946 to 1949, she participated in the Estonian National Theater in Oldenburg, founded in the British occupation zone by the actor and director Kaarel Söödor.

In 1949, she moved from Germany to the United States. In 1950, she cofounded the New York Estonian Theater with Henrik Visnapuu, and she was an actress, director, and playwright there until 1995. Taniloo contributed to the newspapers Vaba Eesti Sõna and Vaba Eestlane, and to Radio Free Europe in Munich, and she also worked as a director for Voice of America.

In 1994, following her husband's death, she returned to Tartu. There, she took a strong interest in Tartu's musical life and participated in the activities of the Vanemuine Cultural Society, which she was elected an honorary member of in January 1996.

== Productions ==
- 1950: Vaese mehe ututall (The Poor Man's Ewe Lamb) by August Mälk
- 1951: The Cousin from Nowhere (Estonian title: Onupoeg Bataaviast) by Eduard Künneke
- 1965: Eedeni aias (In the Garden of Eden) by Arvo Mägi
- 1972: Iluduskuninganna (The Beauty Queen) by Artur Adson
- 1980: Pisuhänd (The Kratt) by Eduard Vilde

== Family ==
Kadi Taniloo was married twice: her first husband, Ernst Kaldma (1909–1970), was an auditor, and her second husband, Heinrich Tekkel (1908–1993), was a pharmacist. Her brother was the sculptor Endel Taniloo.
