= Mari Uusküla =

Estonian linguist (born 1980)

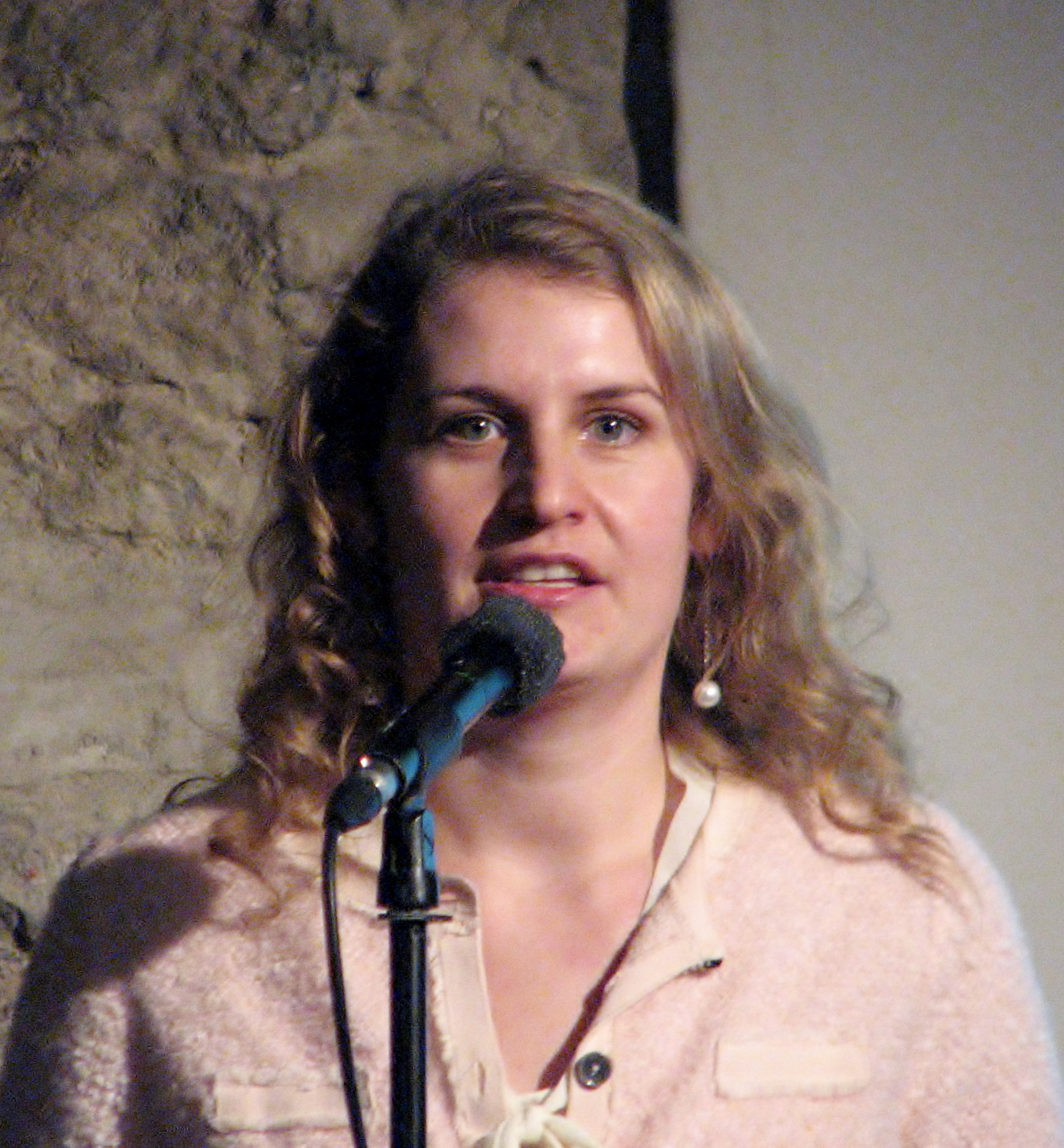
- Mari Uusküla at the presentation of Vadja keele sõnaraamatut (Votic Dictionary) at St. Catherine's Monastery, 2014
- Born: January 23, 1980 (age 46); Tallinn, Estonia
- Occupation: Linguist

Mari Uusküla (until July 1, 2005 Mari Bogatkin; born January 23, 1980) is an Estonian linguist.

== Early life and education ==
Uusküla is the daughter of the ceramist Georg Bogatkin and the paternal granddaughter of the artists Vladimir Bogatkin and Valli Lember-Bogatkina. She is the maternal granddaughter of the sculptor Endel Taniloo.

Uusküla graduated from Tallinn Õismäe Humanities High School in 1998 and from the University of Tartu's Faculty of Arts and Humanities in 2003, majoring in Hungarian. Both her master's thesis and doctoral dissertation were supervised by Urmas Sutrop at the University of Tartu. She defended her dissertation, Basic Colour Terms in Finno-Ugric and Slavonic Languages: Myths and Facts, in 2008 at the Department of General Linguistics.

== Career ==
Uusküla teaches psycholinguistics, anthropological linguistics, semantics, and pragmatics at Tallinn University. She has taught at several other European universities, in Roskilde, Verona, Milan, and Budapest. She is the head of the Western European Studies program at Tallinn University's Institute of Humanities, where she is an associate professor of linguistics and translation studies. She is the head of the Department of Language History, Dialects, and Finno-Ugric Languages at the Institute of the Estonian Language. Much of her research has focused on linguistic aspects of colors.

== Publications ==
- 2008: Basic Colour Terms in Finno-Ugric and Slavonic Languages: Myths and Facts
- 2011: Värvinimede raamat (A Book of Color Names)
- 2015: "Applying Points-of-View Analysis to Individual Variations in Colour Sorting Data," in Journal of Cognition and Culture 15
- 2016: Color Language and Color Categorization (coeditor)
- 2020: "When Does 'Bright' Mean 'Prototypical'? Color-Term Modifiers in Eight European Languages, Examined with Color-Survey Data," in: Journal of the Optical Society of America 37
- 2023: "Is Purple Lost in Translation? The Affective Meaning of Purple, Violet, and Lilac Cognates in 16 Languages and 30 Populations," in: Journal of Psycholinguistic Research 52
- 2023: "Translation of Color Language," in: Encyclopedia of Color Science and Technology (Cham: Springer), pp. 1531–1535
- 2024: "The Purple Mystery: Semantic Meaning of Three Purple Terms in French Speakers from Algeria, France, and Switzerland" (coauthor), in: Color Research & Application 49

== Awards and recognitions ==
- 2000: Estonian National Culture Foundation Scholar
- 2020: Professor of the Year, Tallinn University School of Humanities
- 2021: Achiever of the Year, School of Humanities of Tallinn University
- 2021: Estonian Science Communication Award (incentive prize)
