= Henrik Visnapuu =

Estonian poet and dramatist

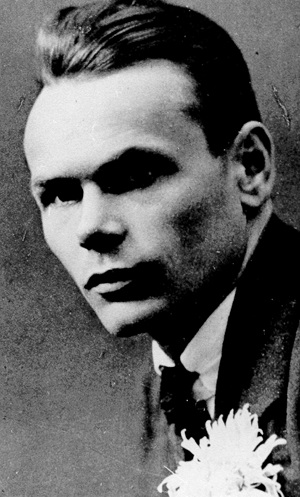
- Visnapuu in 1917
- Born: 2 January 1890; Helme Parish, Governorate of Livonia, Russian Empire
- Died: 3 April 1951 (aged 61); Port Jefferson. New York, United States
- Occupations: Poet, dramatist
- Years active: 1908–1950
- Movement: Siuru

Henrik Visnapuu (2 January 1890 [O.S. 21 December 1889] – 3 April 1951) was an Estonian poet and playwright.

== Life ==
Henrik Visnapuu was born in Helme Parish, Viljandi County, Livonia. He first attended the village school in Reola (today in Ülenurme Parish) and college in Sipe (today in Kambja Parish) and the municipal school in Tartu. In 1907, he graduated from the grammar school in Narva after taking final exams in education and taught at various schools as a primary school teacher. By 1912, he moved to Tartu and taught Estonian literature at the local high school for girls. At the same time, he attended lectures in philosophy at the University of Tartu. Visnapuu worked from 1917 as a journalist at Tallinna Teataja, and then until 1935 he worked as a freelance journalist and author. From 1935 to 1944, he was culture secretary in the department of the Information Agency of the Estonian state.

With the approaching Soviet occupation of Estonia and the return of the Red Army, Henrik Visnapuu fled to Germany in 1944 and in 1949 moved to the United States, where he founded the New York Estonian Theater together with Kadi Taniloo in 1950. He died on Long Island, New York.

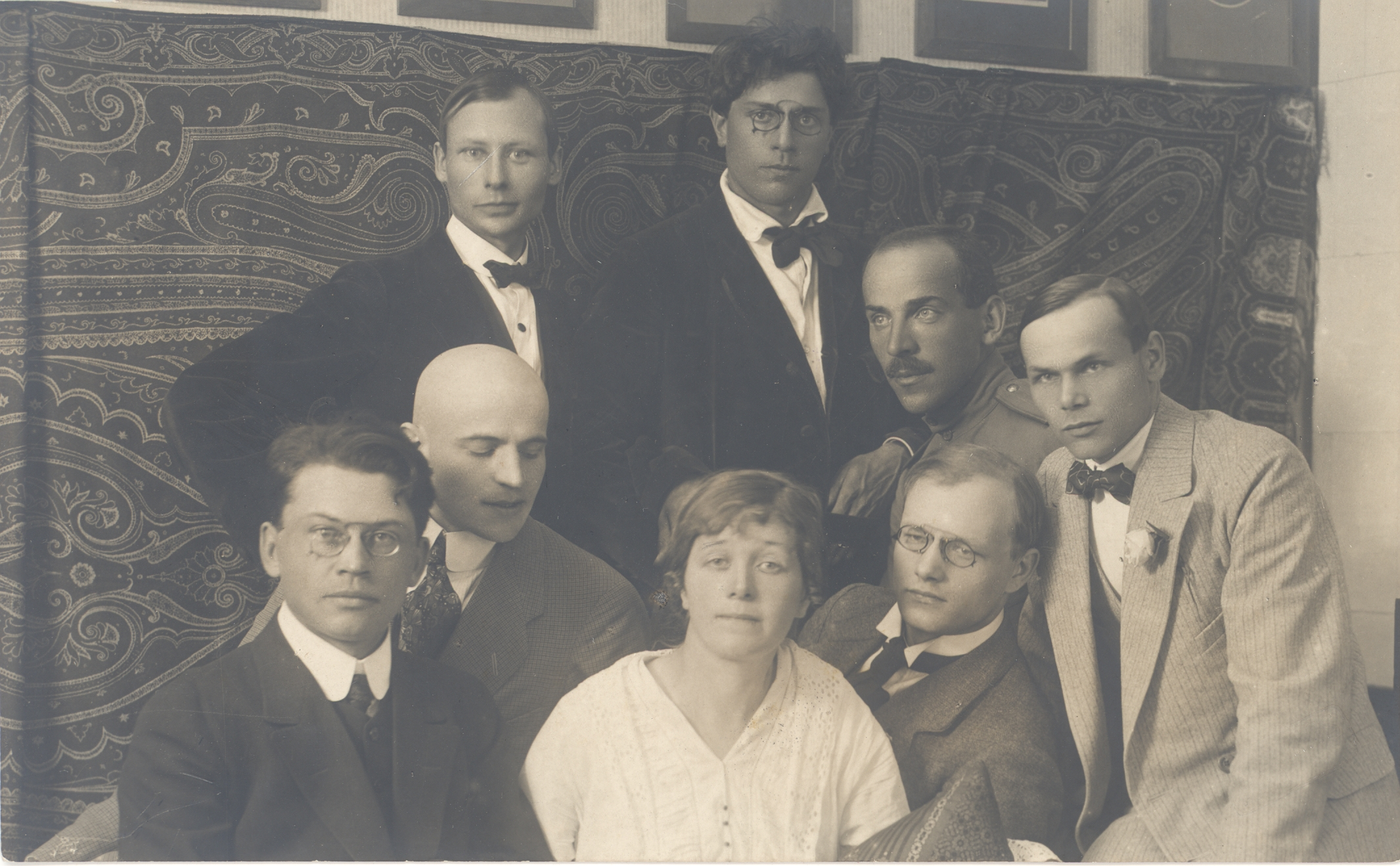
Henrik Visnapuu (seated first on right) with fellow members of the Siuru movement in 1917

== Work ==
Henrik Visnapuu first published his lyrical works in 1908. He was one of the most important Estonian poets in the 1920s and 1930s, until the end of Estonian independence and the return of the Soviet Russian regime, when he was forced to go into exile. Besides Marie Under, he was one of the most influential members of the literary group "Siuru" (founded in 1917), which was strongly influenced by Symbolism. Henrik Visnapuu's poems are mainly of the futuristic and expressionistic genre.

== Death ==
Visnapuu died, aged 61, in Port Jefferson, New York, United States.

== Bibliography ==
- Amores (1917)
- Jumalaga, Ene! (1918)
- Talihari (1920)
- Hõbedased kuljused (1920)
- Käoorvik (1920)
- Ränikivi (1925)
- Maarjamaa laulud (1927)
- Puuslikud (1929)
- Tuulesõel (1931)
- Päike ja jõgi (1932)
- Põhjavalgus (1938)
- Tuule-ema (1942)
- Esivanemate hauad (1946)
- Ad astra (1947)
- Periheel. Ingi raamat (1947)
- Mare Balticum (1948)
- Linnutee (1950)

== Miscellaneous ==
- Visnapuu's poems were used by composer Eduard Tubin in his Requiem for Fallen Soldiers (1979).
