= Valgjärv (Valgjärve) =

Lake in Põlva County, Estonia

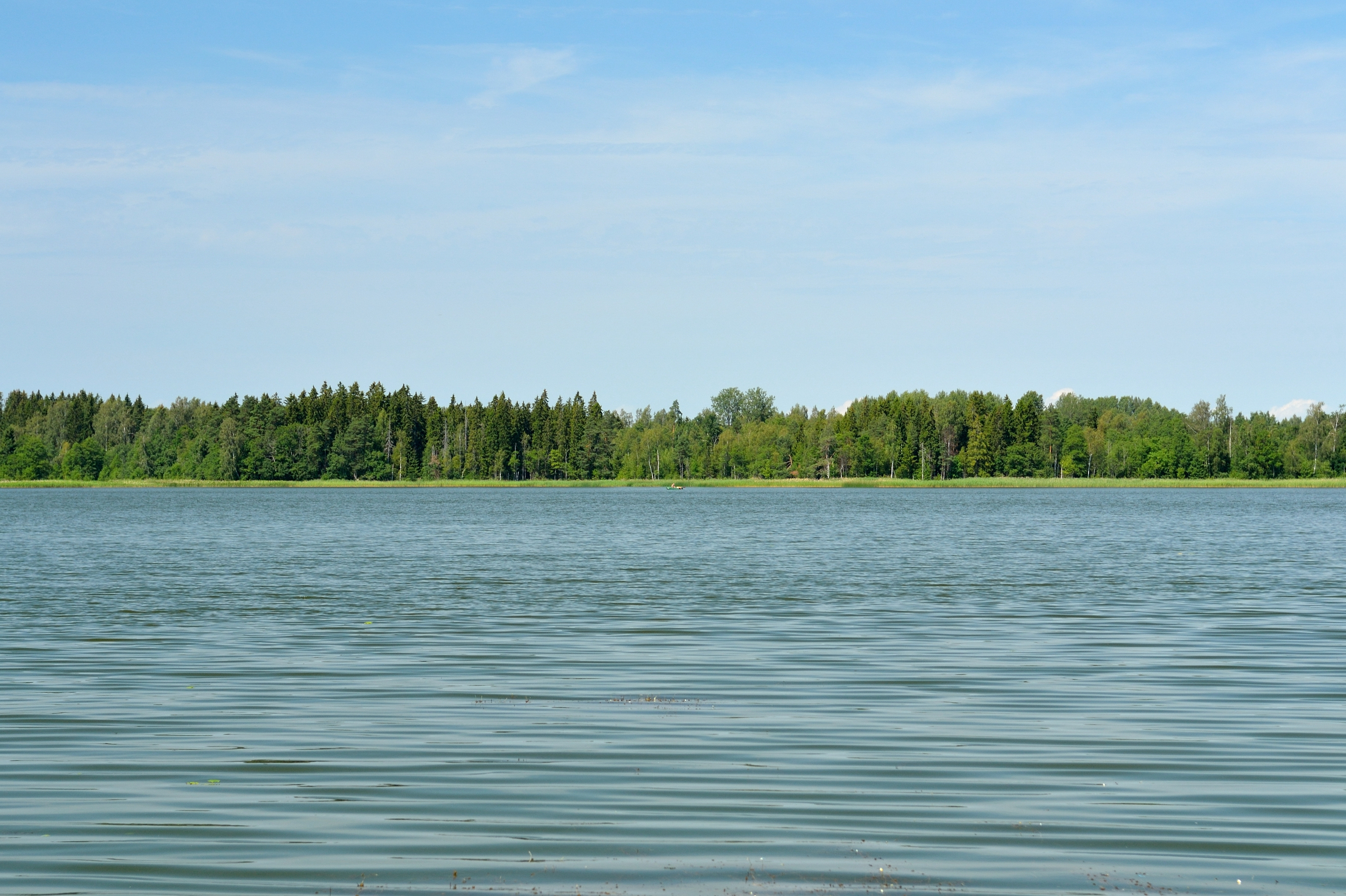

- Location within Estonia
- Location: Kanepi Parish, Põlva County, Estonia
- Coordinates: 58.089169°N 26.638611°E
- Basin countries: Estonia
- Max. length: 1,410 meters (4,630 ft)
- Surface area: 66.2 hectares (164 acres)
- Average depth: 3.2 meters (10 ft)
- Max. depth: 5.1 meters (17 ft)
- Water volume: 2,040,000 cubic meters (72,000,000 cu ft)
- Shore length^{1}: 5,140 meters (16,860 ft)
- Surface elevation: 176.8 meters (580 ft)
- Islands: 3
- ^{1} Shore length is not a well-defined measure.

Valgjärv (also Otepää Valgjärv) is a lake in Estonia. It is located in the village of Valgjärve in Kanepi Parish, Põlva County.

== Physical description ==
The lake has an area of 66.2 hectares (164 acres), and it has three islands with a combined area of 0.8 hectares (2.0 acres). The lake has an average depth of 3.2 meters (10 ft) and a maximum depth of 5.1 meters (17 ft). It is 1,410 meters (4,630 ft) long, and its shoreline measures 5,140 meters (16,860 ft). It has a volume of 2,040,000 cubic meters (72,000,000 cu ft).

== Names ==
The name Valgjärv (lit. 'white lake') is a common designation for lakes in Estonia (compare also the similar Finnish hydronym Valkeajärvi). The naming motivation is considered to be clear water with a shallow light sandy bottom in some areas of the lake. Some lakes named Valgjärv may also have been named to contrast with neighboring lakes called Mustjärv (lit. 'black lake'). The variant name Otepää Valgjärv disinguishes the lake from other Estonian lakes named Valgjärv.

== Legends ==
Various legends say that the lake was formed as a result of the marriage of a sister and brother, or of a father and daughter, because a beggar had been driven away, and so on. However, the lake probably received its name because of its once clear water and sandy shore.

== See also ==
- List of lakes of Estonia
