= Kaarel Liimand =

Estonian painter

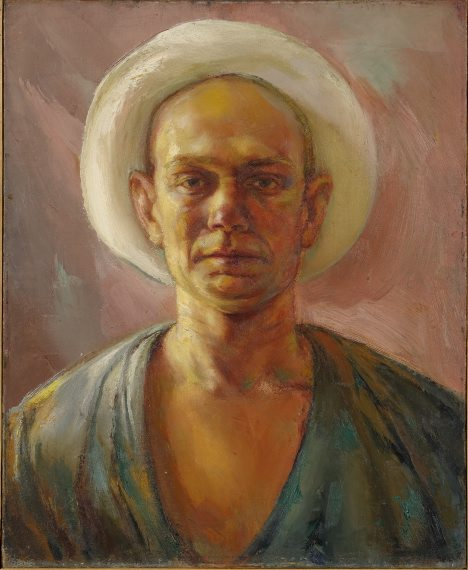
Kaarel Liimand (self-portrait)

Kaarel Liimand (also spelled as Karl Liiman(n); 12 May 1906 in Tartu – August 1941 in Pskov) was an Estonian painter.

He studied at the Pallas Art School.

== Gallery ==
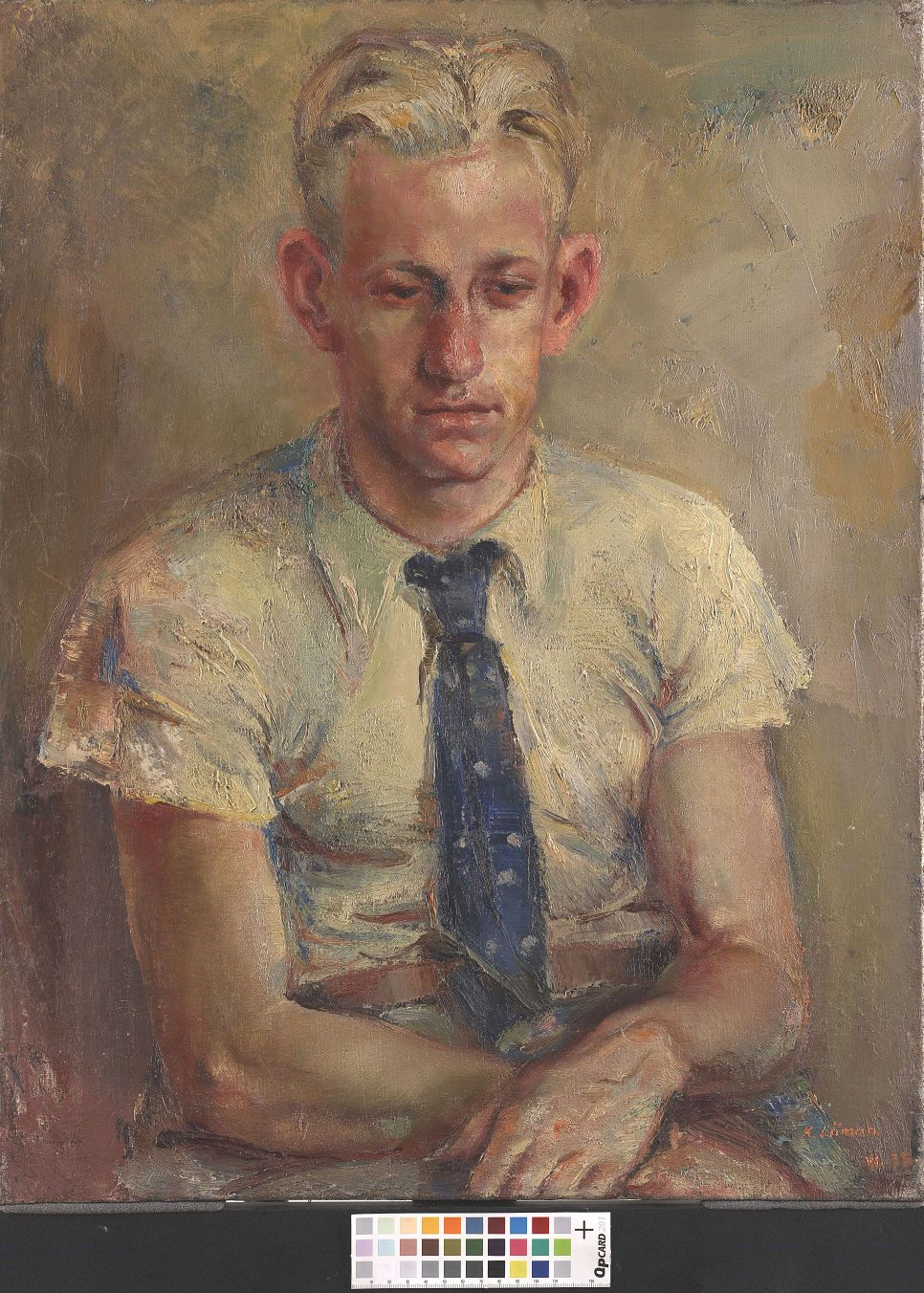
Portrait of Richard Sagrits

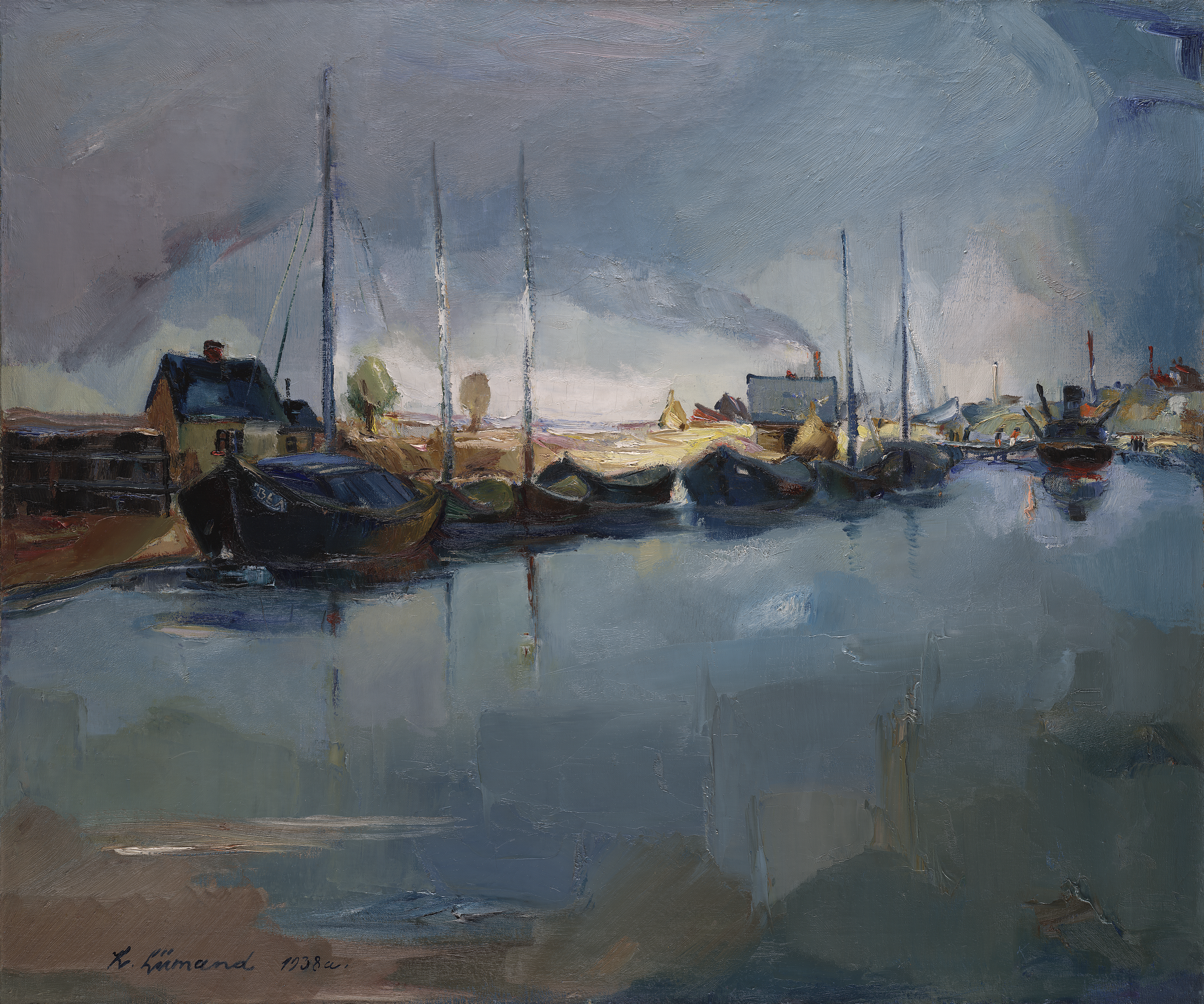
Riverboats on Emajõgi. 1938. Canvas, oil.
