= Valgjärv =

Valgjärv refers to several lakes in Estonia:

- Nohipalu Valgjärv, Kanepi Parish, Põlva County
- Valgjärv (Jeti), Tõrva Parish, Valga County
- Valgjärv (Kose), Võru Parish, Võru County
- Valgjärv (Rõuge), Rõuge Parish, Võru County
- Valgjärv (Valgjärve), Kanepi Parish, Põlva County

== See also ==
- Valgejärv (disambiguation)
