= New York Estonian Theater =

Estonian theater in New York (1950–1992)

Coordinates: 40°44′42.4″N 73°58′34.5″W

The New York Estonian Theater (Estonian: New Yorgi Eesti Teater, NYET) was an Estonian theater abroad that operated in New York from 1950 to 1992. It is considered to have been the most prominent Estonian theater abroad.

== History ==
The theater was established by Henrik Visnapuu and Kadi Taniloo. On November 18, 1949, Visnapuu gave a speech at the New York Estonian House, and he was elected the chairman of the "theater department" of the New York Estonian Educational Society. The theater gave its first performance on April 8, 1950, with a production of August Mälk's 1932 play Vaese mehe ututall (The Poor Man's Ewe Lamb).

The theater had about 50 members, and it primarily performed works by Estonians from home and abroad. The records of the theater are held by the University of Minnesota Libraries.
