= Richard Sagrits =

Estonian painter

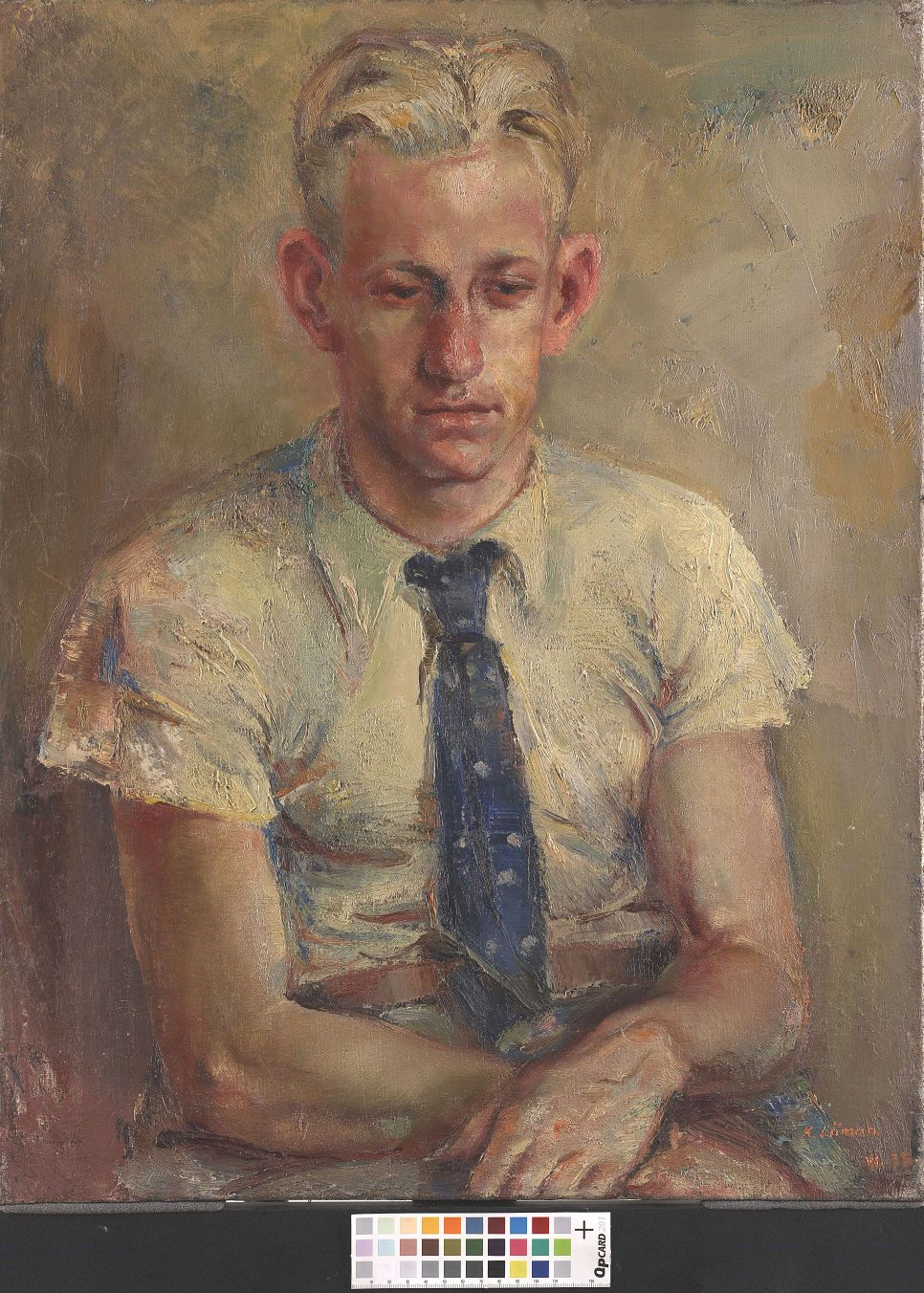
Portrait of Richard Sagrits, by Kaarel Liimand (1935)

Richard Sagrits (19 December 1910 in Karepa – 11 December 1968 in Tallinn) was an Estonian painter.

Sagrits (with Elmar Kits and Evald Okas) painted the ceiling of the Estonian National Opera in the style of Socialist Realism in 1947.

His works can be seen in the Karepa Kalame Farm Museum, Karepa, Vihula Parish, Lääne-Viru County, Estonia.
