= Lo Tui =

Estonian actress, director, and costume designer (1908–1979)

- Born: Loreida Tui; July 21, 1908; Tallinn, Estonia
- Died: September 3, 1979 (aged 71); Tallinn, then part of Estonian SSR, Soviet Union
- Resting place: Metsakalmistu
- Occupations: Actress, director, and costume designer
- Spouse: Oskar Seliaru

Lo Tui (also Loreida Tui, after 1937 Lo Seliaru and Loreida Seliaru; July 21, 1908 – September 3, 1979) was an Estonian actress, director, and costume designer.

== Early life and education ==
Lo Tui was born Loreida Tui in Tallinn, Estonia, the daughter of Robert Vilhelm Tui (1882–1941) and Leontine Adelheid Tui (née Jaanvärk, 1881–?). She graduated from Tallinn Girls' High School in 1926, studied painting at the Ants Laikmaa Studio School from 1926 to 1927, and graduated from the Drama Studio Theater School in 1930.

== Career ==
Tui worked at the Estonian Drama Theater from 1930 to 1952, and at the Estonian Puppet Theater from 1952 to 1970. She also wrote puppet plays.

== Awards and recognitions ==
- 1964: Meritorious Artist of the Estonian SSR

== Productions ==
- 1941: Lo Tui, Vahva rätsep (The Great Tailor)
- 1942: Lo Tui, Õnnepoiss (The Lucky Boy)
- 1942: Lo Tui, Jutuvana pajatab (The Talker Is Talking)
- 1953: Niina Novoseletskaja, Tänamatu mäger (The Ungrateful Badger)
- 1955: Lo Tui, Buratino teab kõik (Buratino Knows Everything)
- 1962: Pencho Manchev, Jänkude kool (Bunny School, Bulgarian: Заячья школа)

== Family ==
Lo Tui married the Estonian actor, director, and puppeteer Oskar Seliaru in Tallinn on May 1, 1937. Oskar Seliaru erroneously sought to have Lo Tui declared legally dead in 1951 because he believed that she had been killed during the Soviet re-occupation of the Baltic states in 1944.
