= Koovi =

Village in Estonia

Coordinates: 58°14′N 22°02′E

- Village
- Interactive map of Koovi
- Country: Estonia
- County: Saare County
- Parish: Saaremaa Parish
- Time zone: UTC+2 (EET)
  - Summer (DST): UTC+3 (EEST)

Koovi is a village in Saaremaa Parish, Saare County in western Estonia.

In the early 1990s there was a maoist community in the village, where a Finnish punk musician Jore Vastelin lived in until his death in 1993.

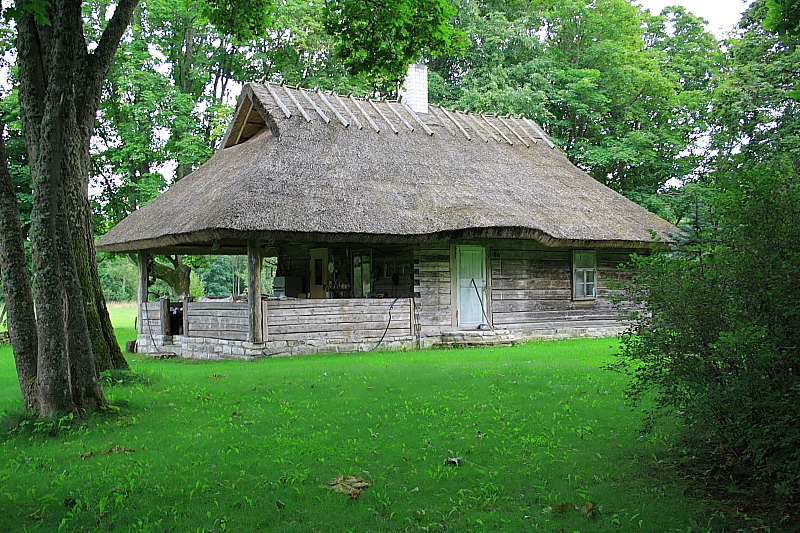
Birthplace of writer August Mälk in Koovi

Before the administrative reform in 2017, the village was in Lääne-Saare Parish.
