= Valgejärv =

Valgejärv refers to several lakes in Estonia:

- Riisipere Valgejärv, Saue Parish, Hiiu County
- Kurtna Valgejärv, Alutaguse Parish, Ida-Viru County

== See also ==
- Valgjärv (disambiguation)
