= Jaan Zimmermann =

Estonian entrepreneur (1880–1942)

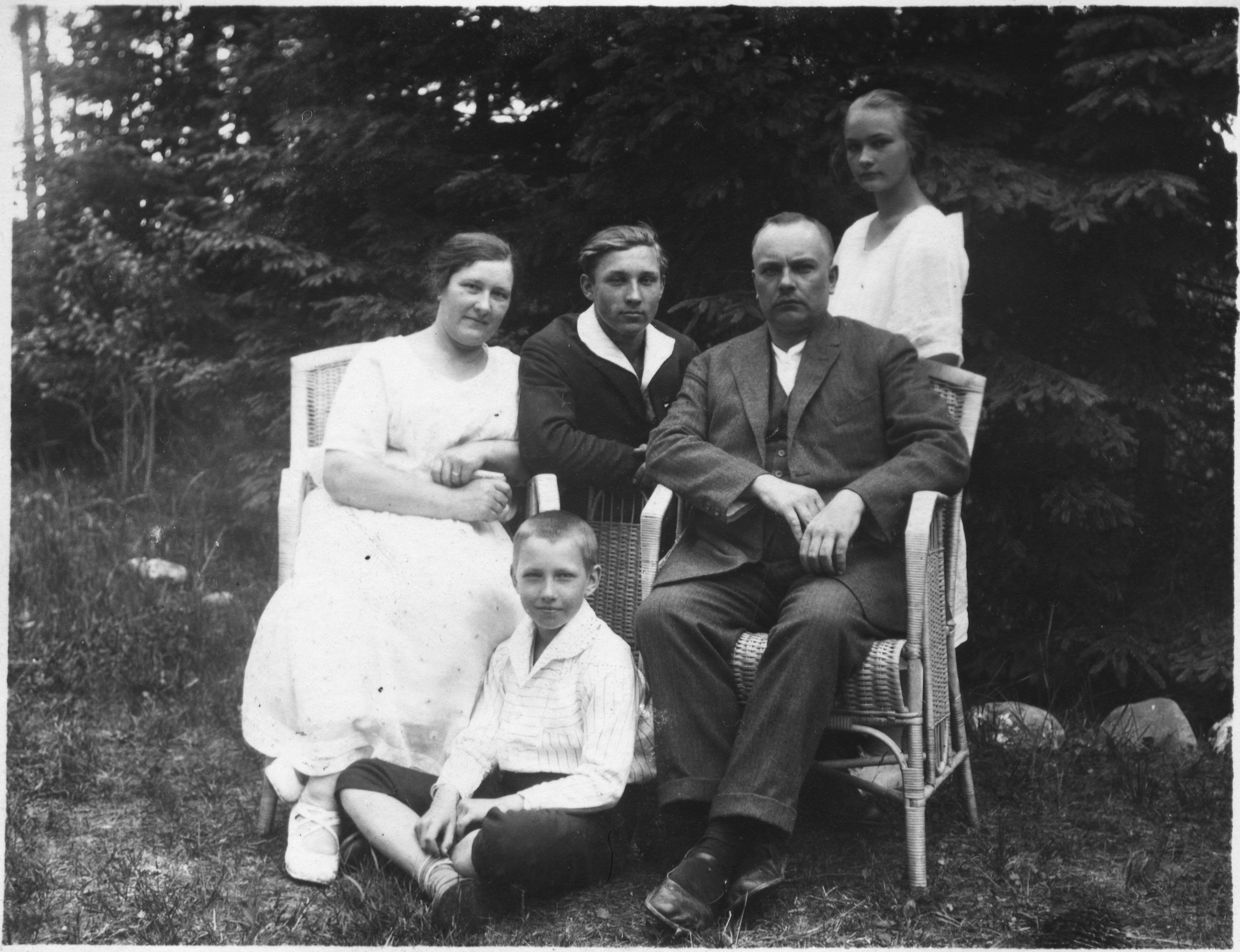
- Zimmermann and his family in Karepa
- Born: May 4, 1880; Sangaste, Tõlliste Parish, Estonia
- Died: April 20, 1942 (aged 61); Vologda Oblast, USSR
- Occupation: Entrepreneur

Jaan Zimmermann (May 4, 1880 – April 20, 1942) was an Estonian entrepreneur.

== Early life and education ==
Jaan Zimmermann was born in Sangaste, Tõlliste Parish, the son of Kotre Zimmermann (1849–1929) and Juuli Zimmermann (née Lattik, 1850–1908). He graduated from the town school in Valga in 1896, and in 1908 he passed the civil service exam.

== Career ==
Zimmermann was the business manager of Military Hospital No. 2 in Tallinn during the Estonian War of Independence. In the early 1920s, Zimmermann founded a printing house, which operated at Lühike Jalg 4 in Tallinn until 1935. In 1935 he sold the printing house, and in January 1936 he founded the car business J. Zimmermann & J. Mölder (with Johan Mölder as co-owner), which represented and sold Auburn, Willys, and Nash cars, as well as oils, engines, batteries, tires, refrigerators, typewriters, bicycles, radios, and more.

From 1929 to 1933, Zimmermann was a member of the medium and small industry section of the Estonian Chamber of Commerce and Industry. From 1926 to 1934, he was the chairman of the Estonian Automobile Club. He was also a member of the Estonian Defense League (the head of Tallinn's Northern Defense Unit). From 1928 to 1935, Zimmermann was the publisher and editor of the magazine Auto (from 1933 to 1934 Auto – Sport & Turism), the publication of the Estonian Automobile Club.

Zimmermann was arrested by the Soviet occupation authorities on December 20, 1940. He died on April 20, 1942, as a result of a stroke in the barracks of the Vyatlag NKVD prison camp in the Vologda Oblast according to the death certificate issued by the camp.

Zimmermann owned the Villa Dombrovka in Karepa, built by the Girard de Soucanton noble family, which Zimmermann named Villa Metsarahu (literally, 'forest peace').

== Awards and recognitions ==
- 1928: Order of the Estonian Red Cross, 2nd class
- 1931: Order of the Cross of the Eagle, 5th class
- 1940: Estonian Auto Club gold medal

== Family ==
Zimmermann married Juliane Künnapu (1878–?) and they had three children: their sons August (1906–1997) and Alfred (1912–1961), and their daughter Luise Johanna (1910–1946). Zimmermann's daughter-in-law (his son August's wife) was the singer Milvi Laid (1906–1976).
