= Valli Lember-Bogatkina =

Estonian artist (1921–2016)

- Born: Valentine Lember; October 30, 1921; Tartu, Estonia
- Died: June 14, 2016 (aged 94)
- Education: Tarbekunstiateljee
- Known for: Watercolor art, Ceramics, Monuments
- Spouse: Vladimir Bogatkin (m. 1949)
- Awards: Order of the White Star; 2006 Class 4

Valli Lember-Bogatkina (30 October 1921 – 14 June 2016) was known as "The Grand Old Lady of Estonian watercolor". Her works are exhibited in cities around the world.

== Biography ==
Valentine Lember was the daughter of a builder, Gustav Lember, and Sinaida Lember (née Solotnikova), a housewife, in Tartu. In 1922, the family moved to Nõmme, where Lember studied at Nõmme Russian Primary School. At Nõmme Hiiu Primary School, she struggled with bad marks from teachers because her notebooks were full of drawings. The headmaster was impressed with her drawing and recommended that she attend the State School of Arts and Crafts. Lember graduated in 1940.

From 1940 to 1941, she worked as an interior designer at Architect Meyer, mainly in glass and mosaic. In 1941, she was recruited at the Tallinn Art College. She worked with the decorator Voldemar Haas at the Estonia Theater and as a decorator at the Varietees Plaza. In 1942, she received an invitation from the sculptor Anton Starkopf to study at the Higher Visual Arts Courses in Tartu. It was there for the first time her watercolors were displayed at the school's autumn exhibition.

She was one of the first members of the Estonian Artists 'Union Artists' Association in 1944. She married Moscow artist Vladimir Bogatkin in 1949.

== Art ==
Lember-Bogatkina was employed to create public works of art for the city of Tallinn and also traveled as part of a contingent of artists for the Soviet Estonian government. She painted portraits, landscapes, and illustrations for children's books.

She began exhibiting in 1942. The artist's exhibitions included the Embassy of Copenhagen, Finland's Jyväskylä University, Tallinn Art Hall and Nõmme Museum. On November 3, 2012, Tõnismäe Gallery was opened with Valli Lember-Bogatkina's exhibition "Music / Dance", which featured her final theses at State Art School: three mosaics that represent three pillars of the Estonian economy through three beautiful girls.

Lember-Bogatkina also created monuments for commemorations and murals for art spaces.

== Personal life ==
In 1949, the artist married Vladimir Bogatkin (1922–1971). Their younger son, Georg Bogatkin, is a ceramicist, and their older son, Vladimir Bogatkin Jr., is a documentary director. Their daughter-in-law Airike Taniloo-Bogatkin is a sculptor. She was the grandmother of the linguist Mari Uusküla.

== Awards ==
- 1983: Merited Artist of the Estonian SSR
- 2006: Order of the White Star, Class IV

== Commemoration ==
The documentary Vivat Valli! Was dedicated to the 90th anniversary of Valli Lember-Bogatkina.

== Books ==
- Valli Lember-Bogatkina. Nii see oli (That's How It Was). Tallinn: Varrak, 2006, 167 pp. ISBN 9789985313176 (volume)
