= Endel Taniloo =

Estonian sculptor (1923–2019)

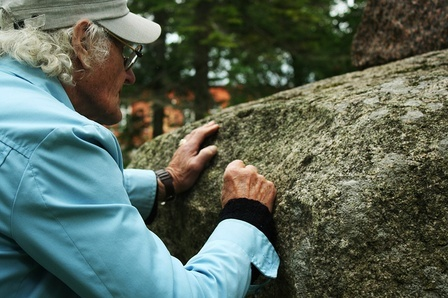
Taniloo sculpting in 2012

Endel Eduard Taniloo, born Danilov (5 January 1923 – 28 November 2019), was an Estonian sculptor and recipient of Order of the White Star in 2002. He was born in Tartu. He was the brother of the actress, theater director, and journalist Kadi Taniloo, and the grandfather of the linguist Mari Uusküla.

== Awards ==
- 2004: Anton Starkopf Fellowship
