= Georg Bogatkin =

Estonian ceramicist

- Born: April 22, 1954 (age 72); Tallinn, then part of Estonian SSR, Soviet Union
- Education: State Art Institute of the Estonian SSR
- Known for: Ceramics

Georg Bogatkin (born April 22, 1954) is an Estonian ceramist.

== Education ==
Bogatkin graduated from Tallinn 46th Secondary School (now Pelgulinn High School) in 1972 and from the State Art Institute of the Estonian SSR as a ceramist in 1978.

== Family ==
Bogatkin's mother was the Estonian artist Valli Lember-Bogatkina, and his father was the Russian artist Vladimir Bogatkin. His wife is the sculptor and ceramist Airike Taniloo-Bogatkin. His daughter is the linguist Mari Uusküla.
