= Vladimir Bogatkin =

Russian artist

- Born: August 5, 1922; Moscow, Russia
- Died: April 13, 1971 (aged 48)
- Education: All-Russian Academy of Arts
- Known for: Stage design, sketches, book and magazine illustrations

Vladimir Valeryanovich Bogatkin (Russian: Владимир Валерьянович Богаткин; October 5, 1922 – April 13, 1971) was a Russian artist.

Bogatkin was born in Moscow in 1922, the son of Ksenia Semenova, a director and actress at the Vakhtangov Theater, and an actor in Chaliapin's studio.

In 1934, he began his art studies in the studio of the graphic artist Aleksei Ilyich Kravchenko. In 1936 he enrolled at the higher art school of the All-Russian Academy of Arts in Leningrad (now the St. Petersburg Institute for Painting, Sculpture and Architecture). From 1940 to 1942, he worked as a stage designer at the Central Theater of the Red Army in Moscow. In 1942 he was drafted into the Red Army, and in 1943 he joined the studio of war artists established by Mitrofan Grekov and participated in the Second World War as part of the 2nd Ukrainian Front, covering the combat as an artist. For his wartime service, he received the medal "For Battle Merit" and the medal "For the Victory over Germany in the Great Patriotic War 1941–1945".

In 1949, he married the Estonian artist Valli Lember, with whom he had two sons: the cinematographer Vladimir Bogatkin (1951–2021) and the ceramist Georg Bogatkin (born 1954).The couple lived alternately in Tallinn and Moscow.

Bogatkin illustrated books and magazines. He presented his work at exhibitions in East Germany, Czechoslovakia, Hungary, Russia, and Estonia. In 1960, the Bogatkins built a summer house in Karepa. In several of his works, Bogatkin depicted the landscape around Karepa and the life of fishermen.

Vladimir Bogatkin died in 1971 while traveling on the train from Leningrad to Tallinn.
