= Kose, Võru County =

Borough in Estonia

Kose
- Small borough
- Location in Estonia
- Coordinates: 57°48′53″N 27°02′06″E
- Country: Estonia
- County: Võru County
- Municipality: Võru Parish

Population
  - Total: 615

Kose is a small borough (Estonian: alevik) in Võru Parish, Võru County, in southeastern Estonia. It has a population of 615.

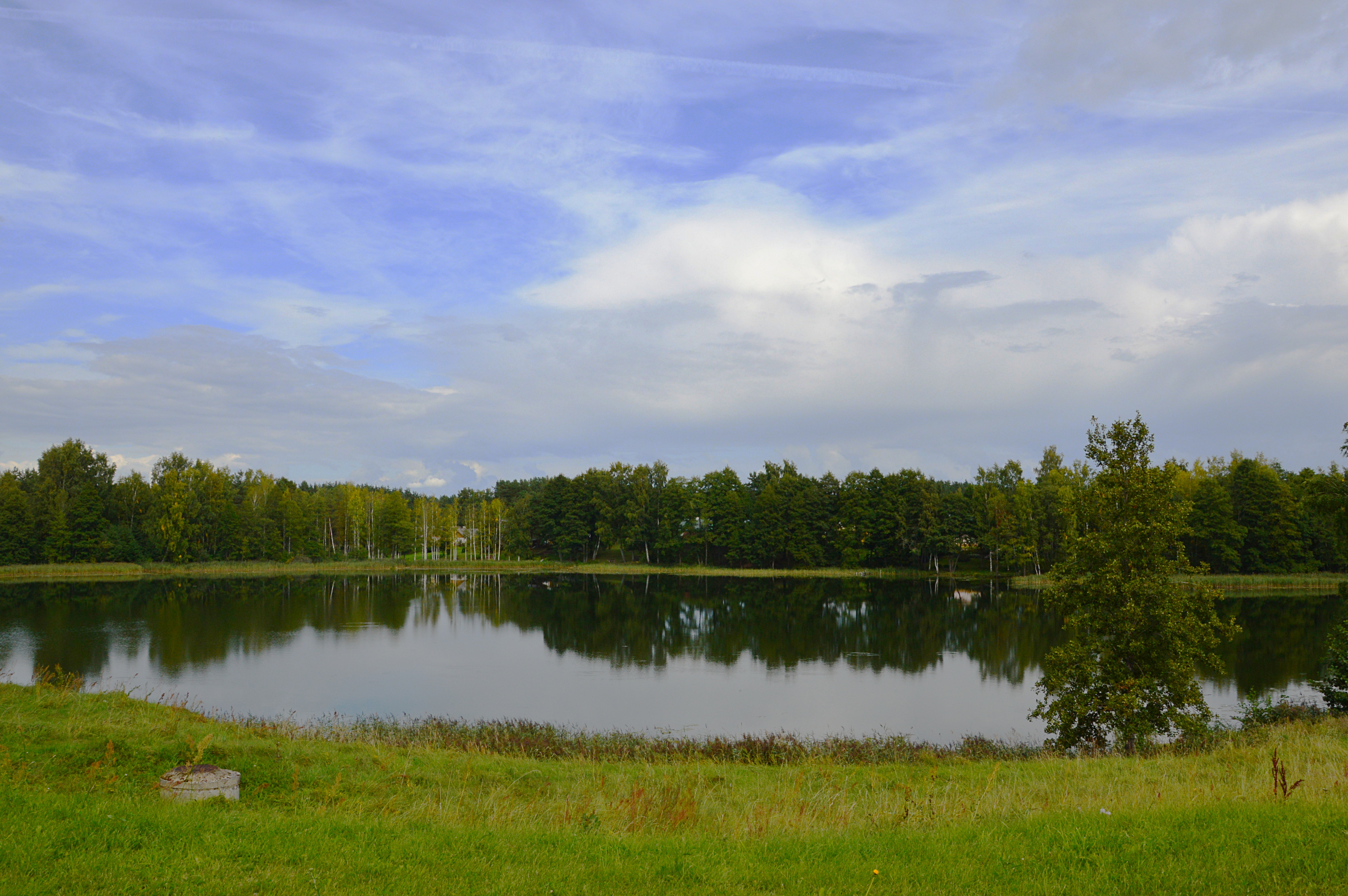
Lake Pappjärv

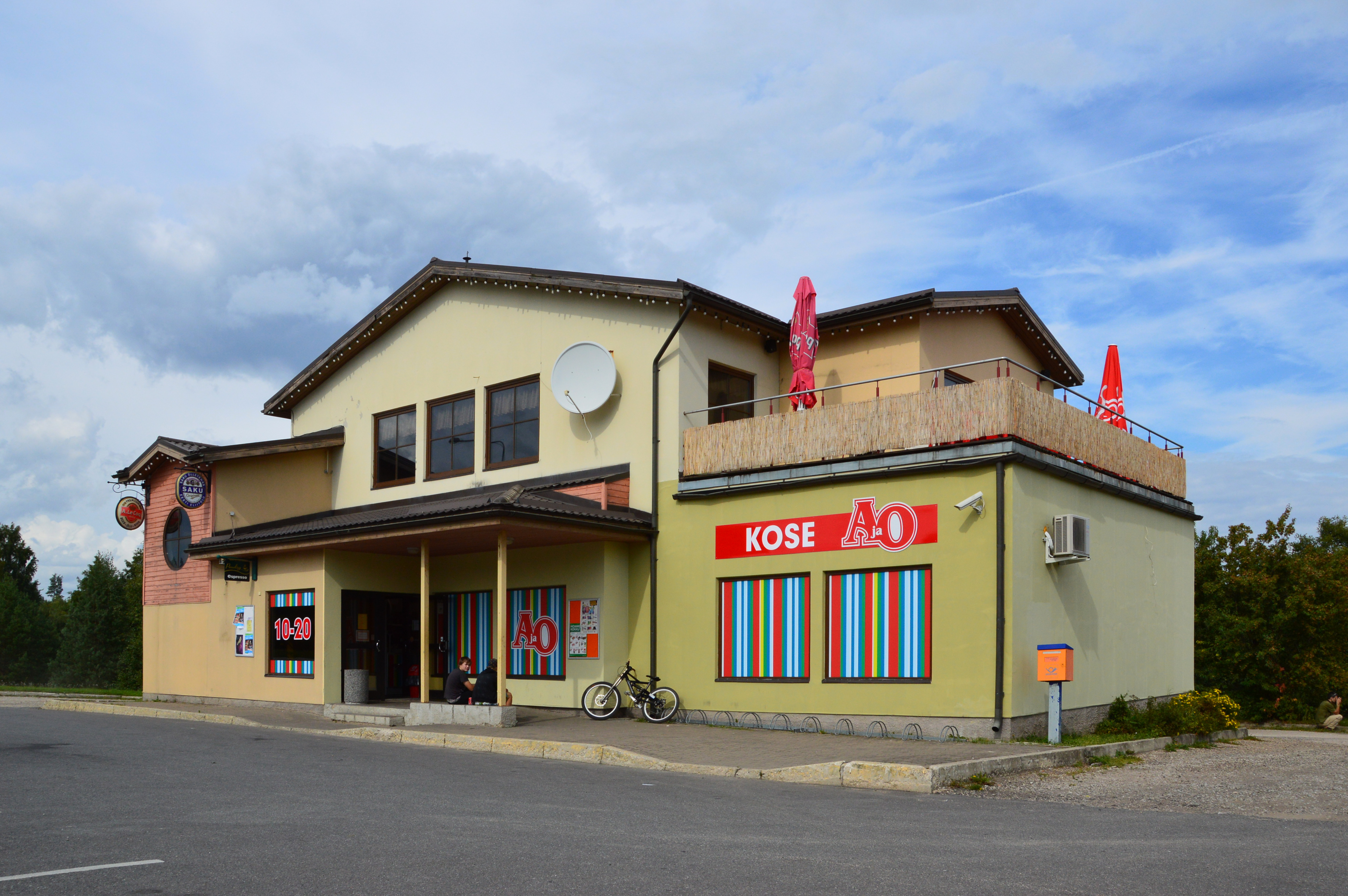
Shop

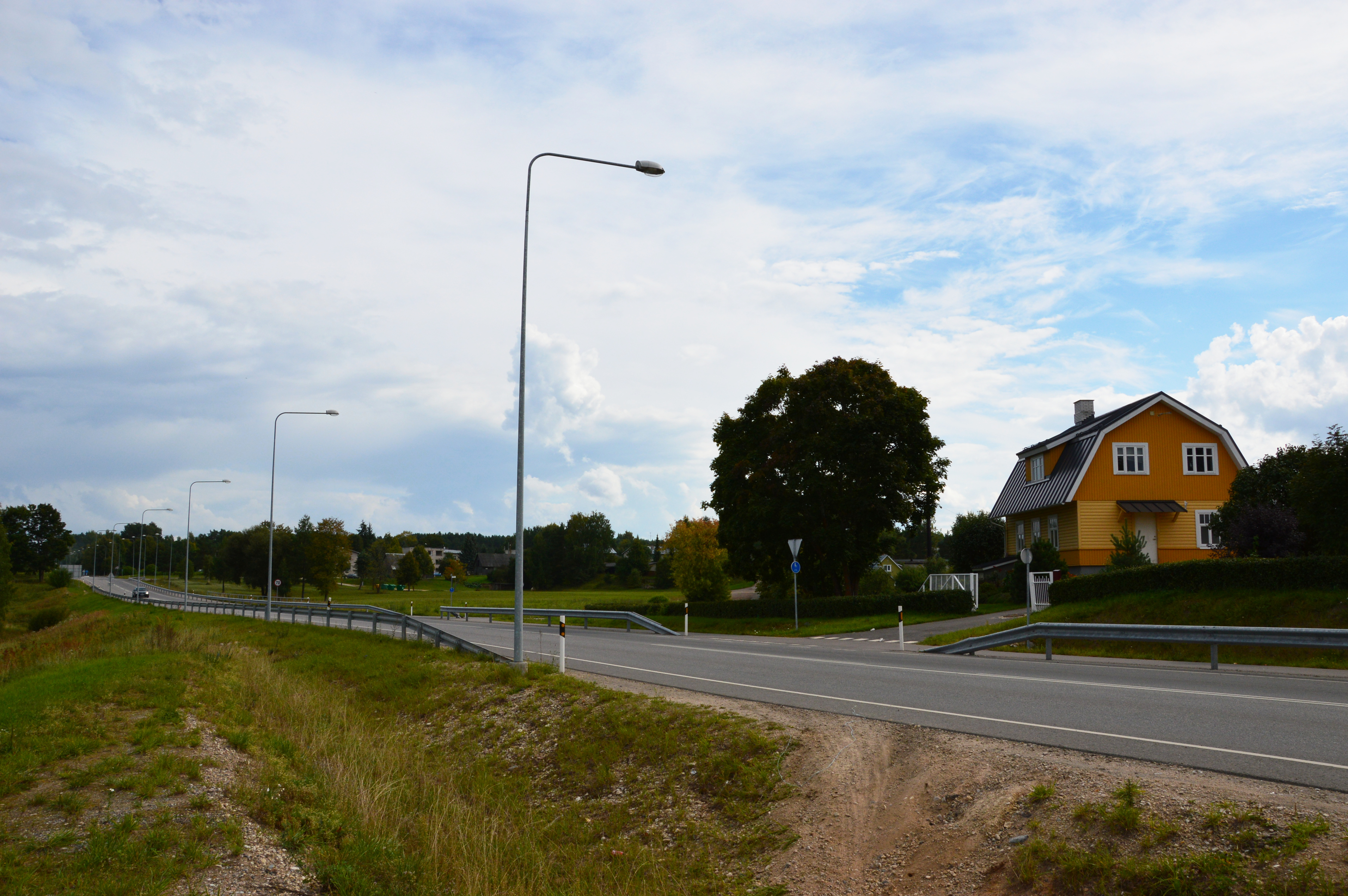
