= August Mälk =

Estonian writer and politician

- Born: 4 October 1900; Koovi, Kreis Ösel, Governorate of Livonia, Russian Empire (present day Estonia)
- Died: 19 December 1987 (aged 87); Stockholm, Sweden
- Occupations: Writer, politician
- Years active: 1926–1987
- Spouse: Pauline "Leini" Triipan

August Mälk (4 October 1900 – 19 December 1987) was an Estonian writer and politician.

== Life ==
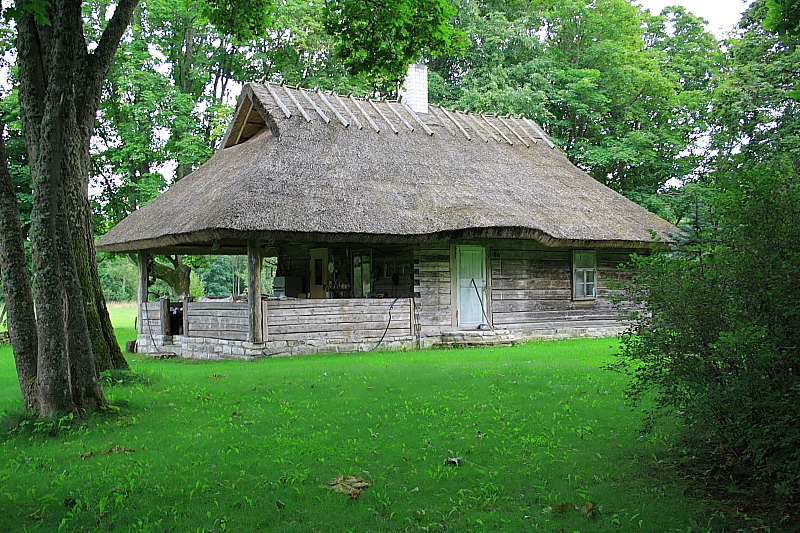
Birthplace of August Mälk in Koovi

August Mälk was born on 4 October [O.S. 21 September] 1900, in Lümanda Parish in the village of Koovi (then named Kipi-Koovi), located on the west coast of the island of Saaremaa, in modern-day Estonia (then part of the Governorate of Livonia in the Russian Empire). He attended the University of Tartu from 1923 to 1925 and then returned to Saaremaa to work as a teacher. He began his literary career while headmaster of the elementary school in Lümanda, publishing his first novel, Kesaliblik in 1926.

Mälk married Pauline Triipan in 1933. The couple had one daughter.

In 1935, Mälk achieved great success with his novel Õitsev Meri (The Flowering Sea), depicting life in a fishing village. It was the first volume of a trilogy that also included Taeva Palge All (Under the Face of Heaven) and Hea Sadam (The Good Port). In addition to his 18 novels, he also wrote plays, short stories and two books of memoirs. Several of his novels have been translated into German and Finnish.

Mälk became involved in politics in the 1930s. He was a member of the National Constituent Assembly (Rahvuskogu) in 1937. In 1938, he was elected to the Chamber of Deputies (Riigivolikogu), where he served until the Soviet invasion of Estonia in 1940.

In 1944, Mälk fled into exile in Sweden during the second Soviet invasion of Estonia. In Stockholm, he served as the chairman of the Estonian Writers Union Abroad (Välismaine Eesti Kirjanike Liit) from its founding in 1945 until 1982. He died in Stockholm in 1987.

In 2000, the Estonian Post Office issued a stamp commemorating the centenary of Mälk's birth.

== Works ==
=== Novels ===
- Kesaliblik (1926)
- Õnnepagulane (1928)
- Hukkumine (1928)
- Läbi öö (1929)
- Kivine pesa (1932)
- Üks neistsinastest (1933)
- Surnud majad (1934)
- Õitsev meri (1935)
- Läänemere isandad (1936)
- Taeva Palgen all (1937)
- Kivid Tules (1939)
- Hea sadam (1942)
- Öised linnud (1945)
- Kodumaata (1947)
- Tea kaevule (two volumes, 1952–1953)
- Päike küla kohal (1957)
- Toomas Tamm (1959)
- Kevadine maa (1963)

=== Short stories and novels ===
- Surnu surm (1926)
- Anne-Marie (six short stories, 1927)
- Surnud elu (1929)
- Jutte lindudest (six children stories, 1934)
- Rannajutud (five short stories, 1936)
- Avatud värav. Lugu minevikust (1937)
- Mere tuultes (four short stories, 1938)
- Päike Kadunud. Jutte minevikust (five stories, 1943)
- Jumala tuultes. Viis jutustust (1949)
- Tuli sinu Isesüttiv (seven short stories, 1955)
- Jumalaga, meri! (1967)
- Project Victoria. Kuus lugu (1978)
- Tere, meri! (Collection, posthumously ed. Aarne Vinkel, 1991)

=== Plays ===
- Moodne Cain (1930)
- Vaese mehe ututall (Comedy, 1932)
- Neitsid lampidega (Comedy, 1933)
- Isad tee (1934)
- Mees merelt (1935)
- Õitsev meri (dramatization of Andres Särev, 1936)
- Vanakurja vokk (dramatization of Paul Sepp, 1936)
- Õnnega hada (comedy, under the pseudonym Kihulane Juhan, 1937)
- Sikud kaevul (Comedy, 1938)
- Taeva Palgen all (dramatization of Andres Särev, 1938)

=== Memoirs ===
- Hommikust keskpäevani. Elupilte ja mälestusi (1972)
- Peale päevapööret. Mõtteid ja mälestusi (1976)
