= Rõuge =

Borough in Estonia

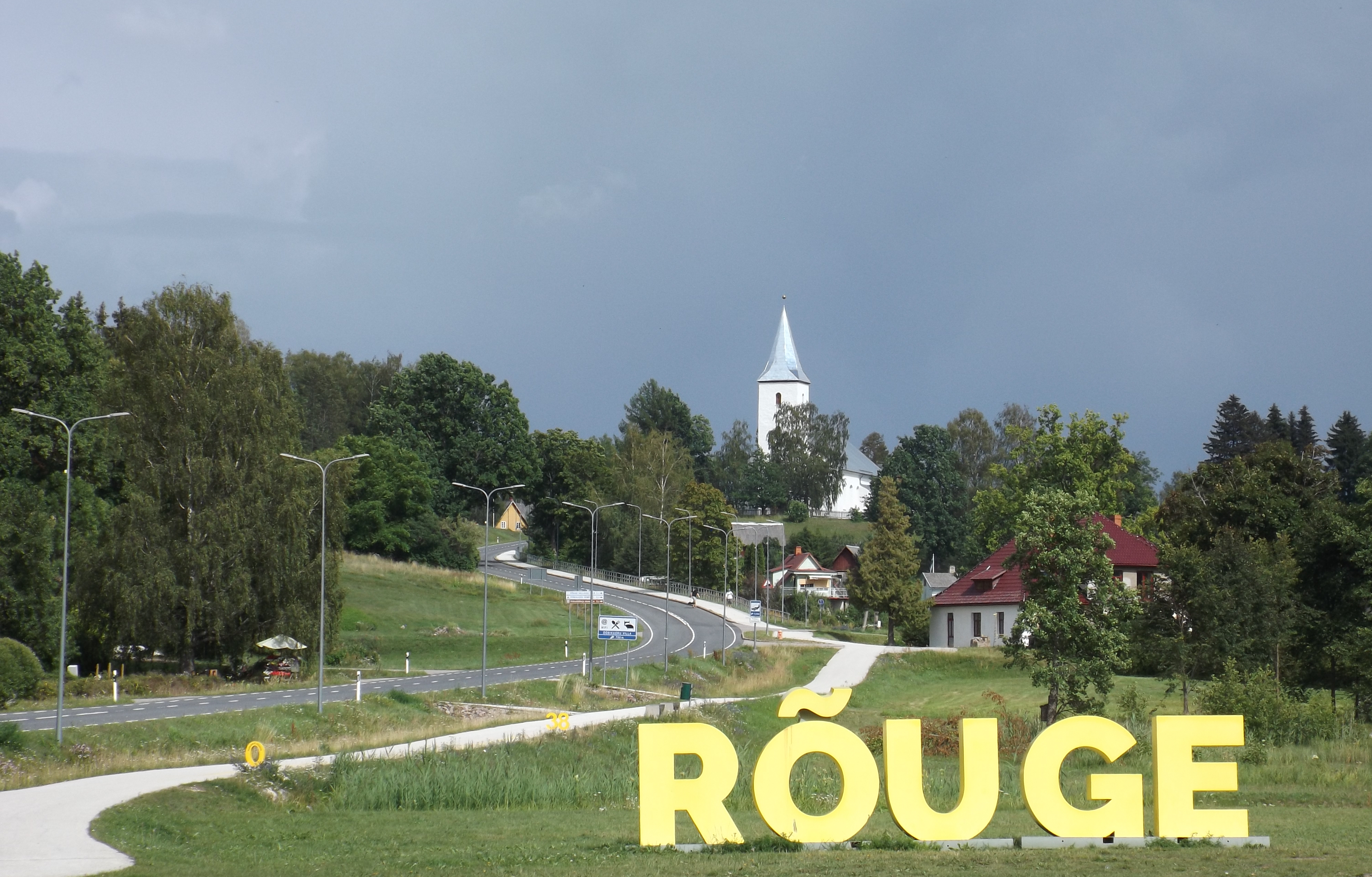

- Location within Estonia
- Coordinates: 57°43′40″N 26°54′35″E
- Country: Estonia
- County: Võru County
- Parish: Rõuge Parish
- Time zone: UTC+2 (EET)

Rõuge (Võro: Rõugõ; German: Rauge) is a small borough (alevik) in Võru County in southeastern Estonia. It is the administrative centre of Rõuge Parish.

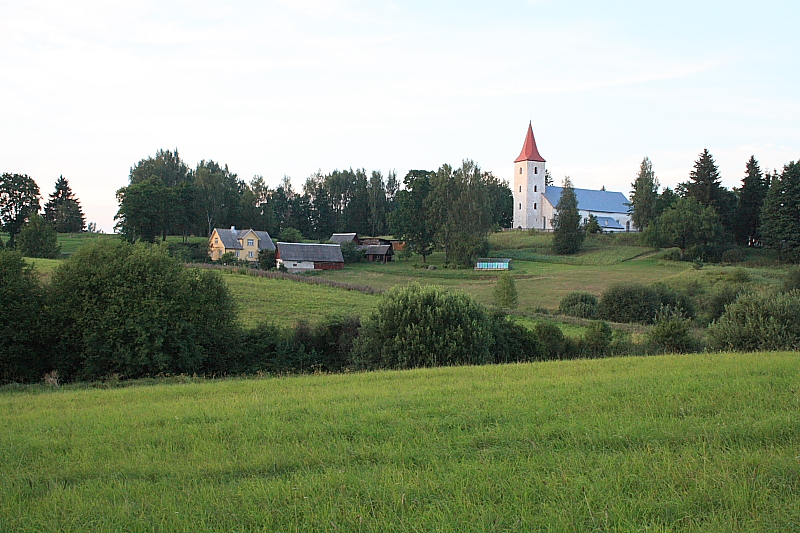
St. Mary's church

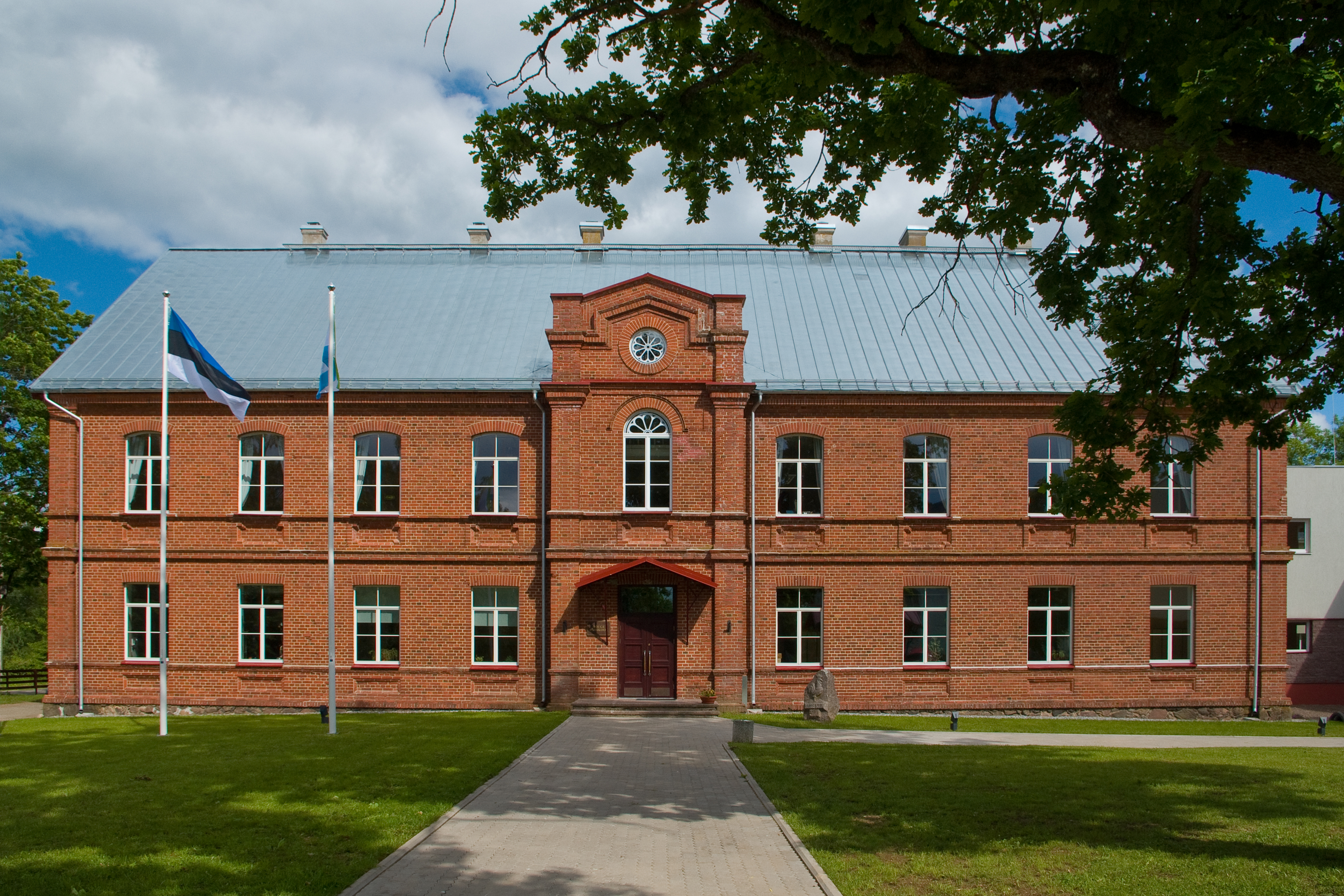
Rõuge school

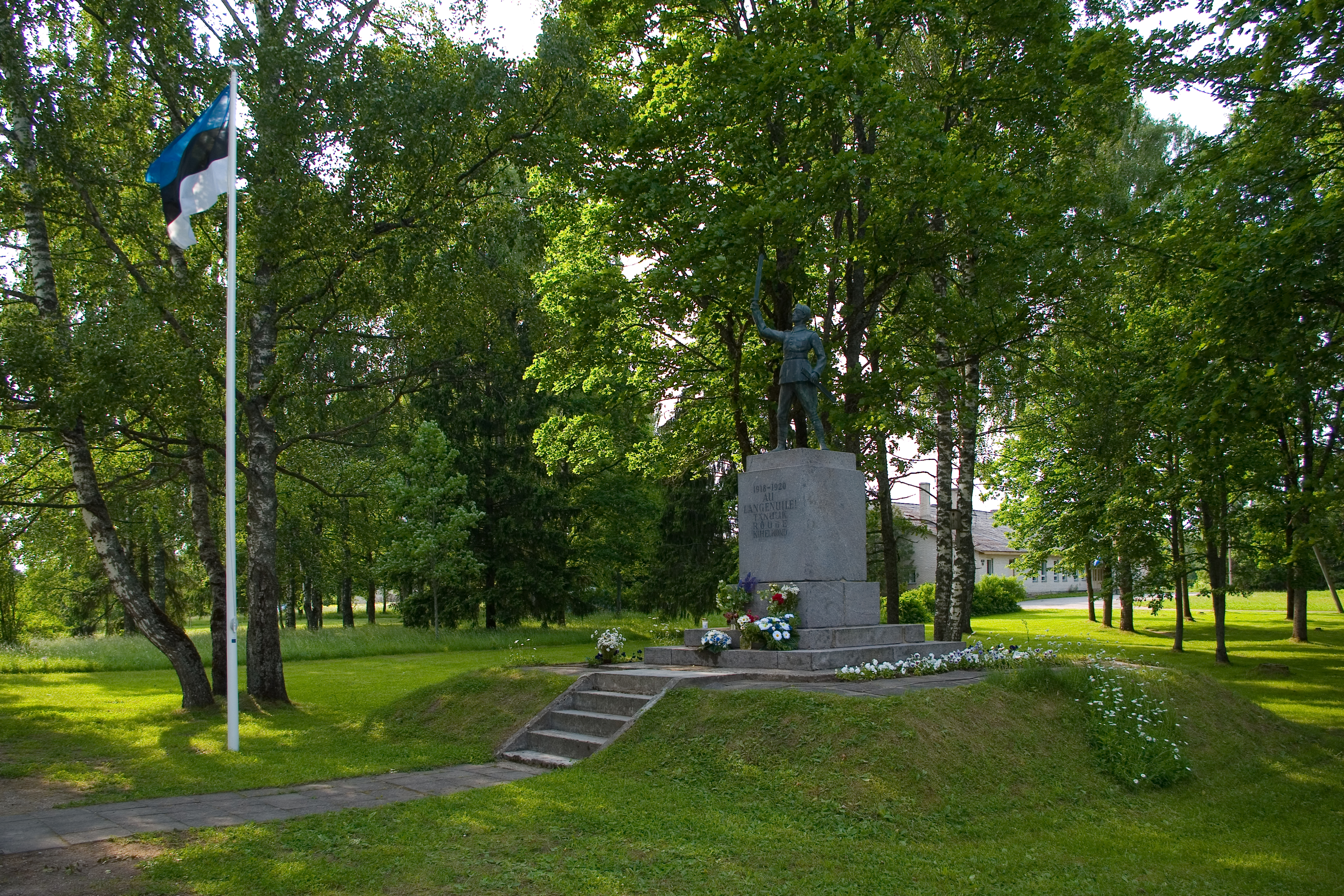
Monument to the Estonian War of Independence

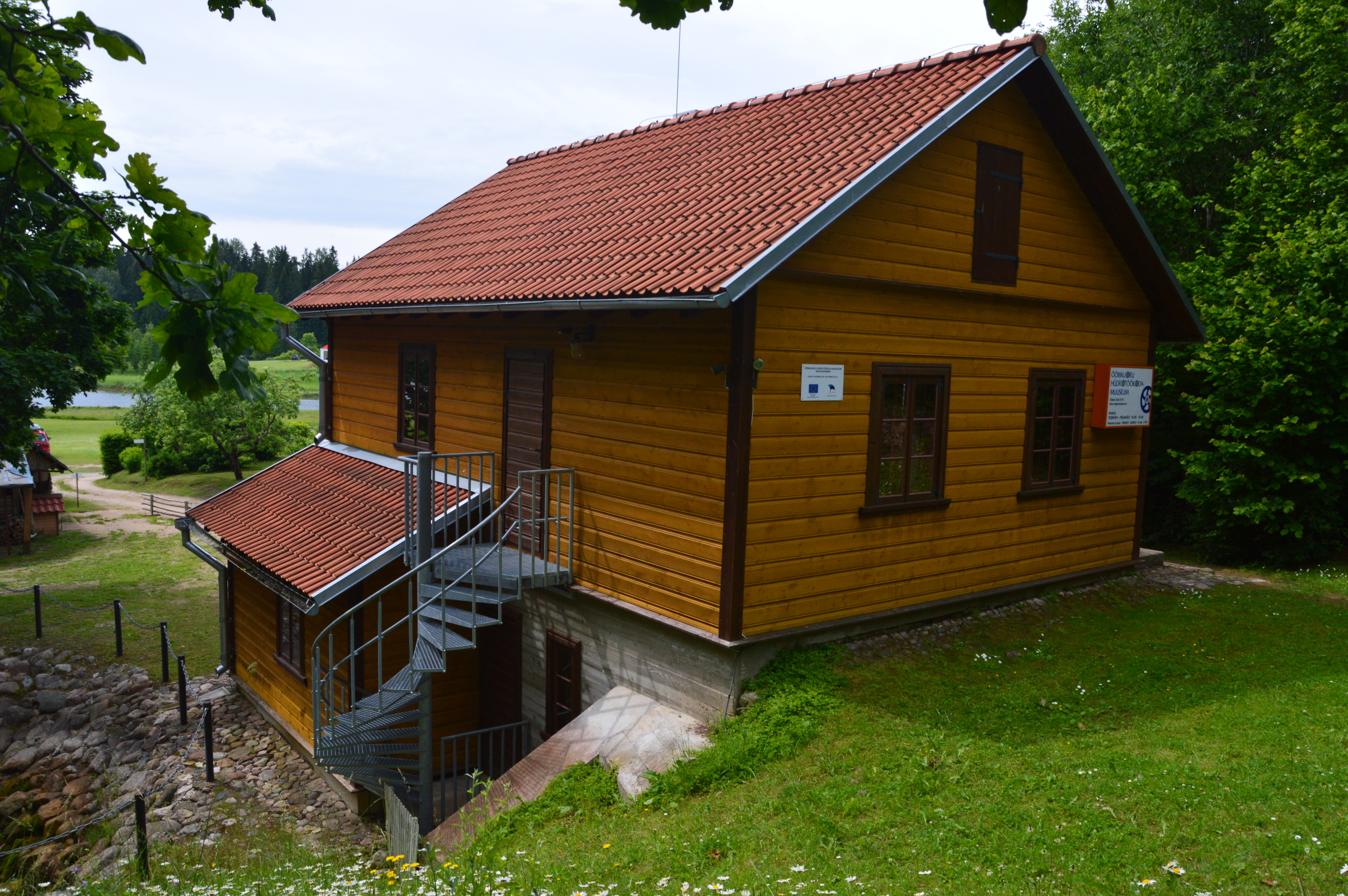
Rõuge Museum

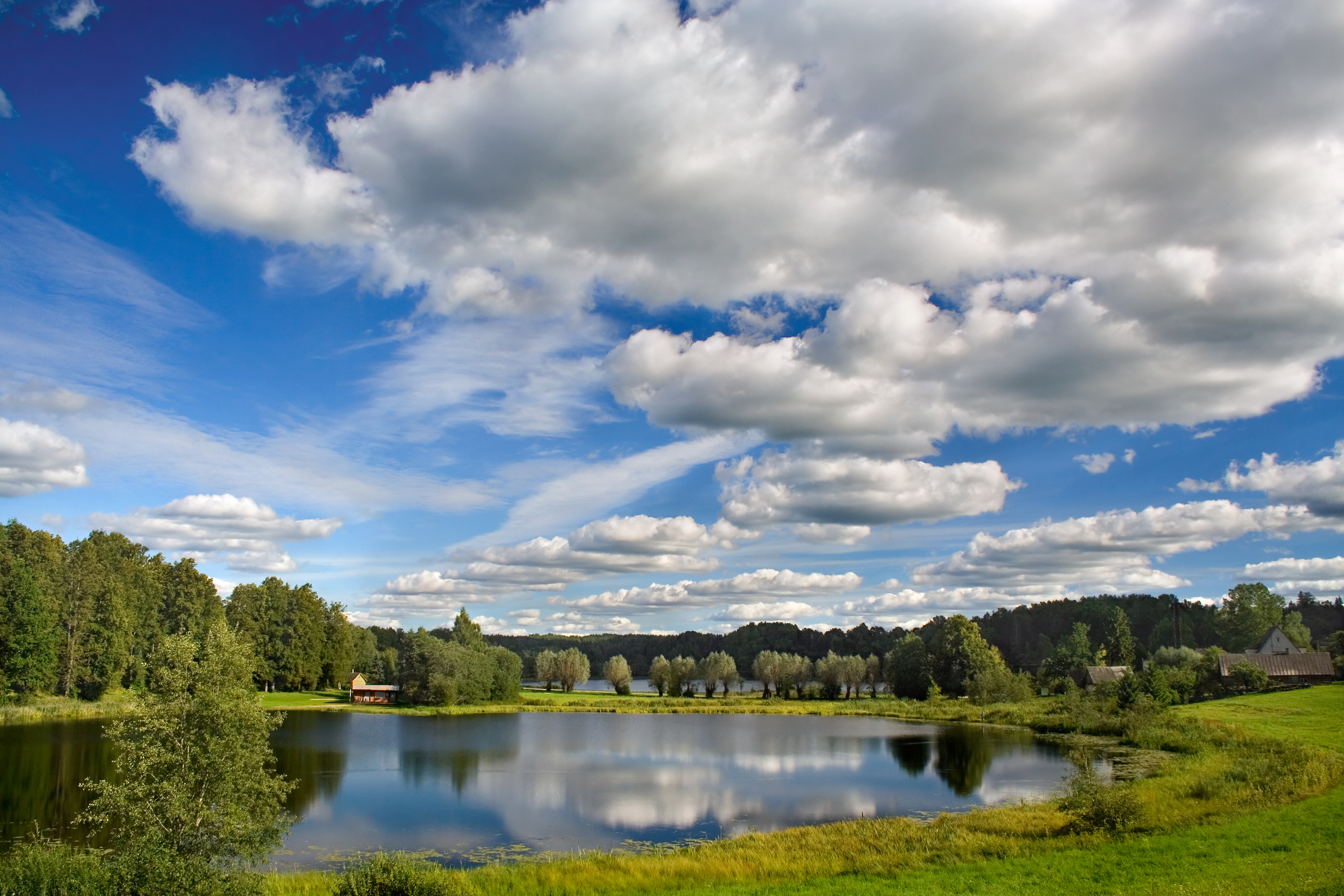
Kaussjärv (also known as Rõuge Mõisajärv)

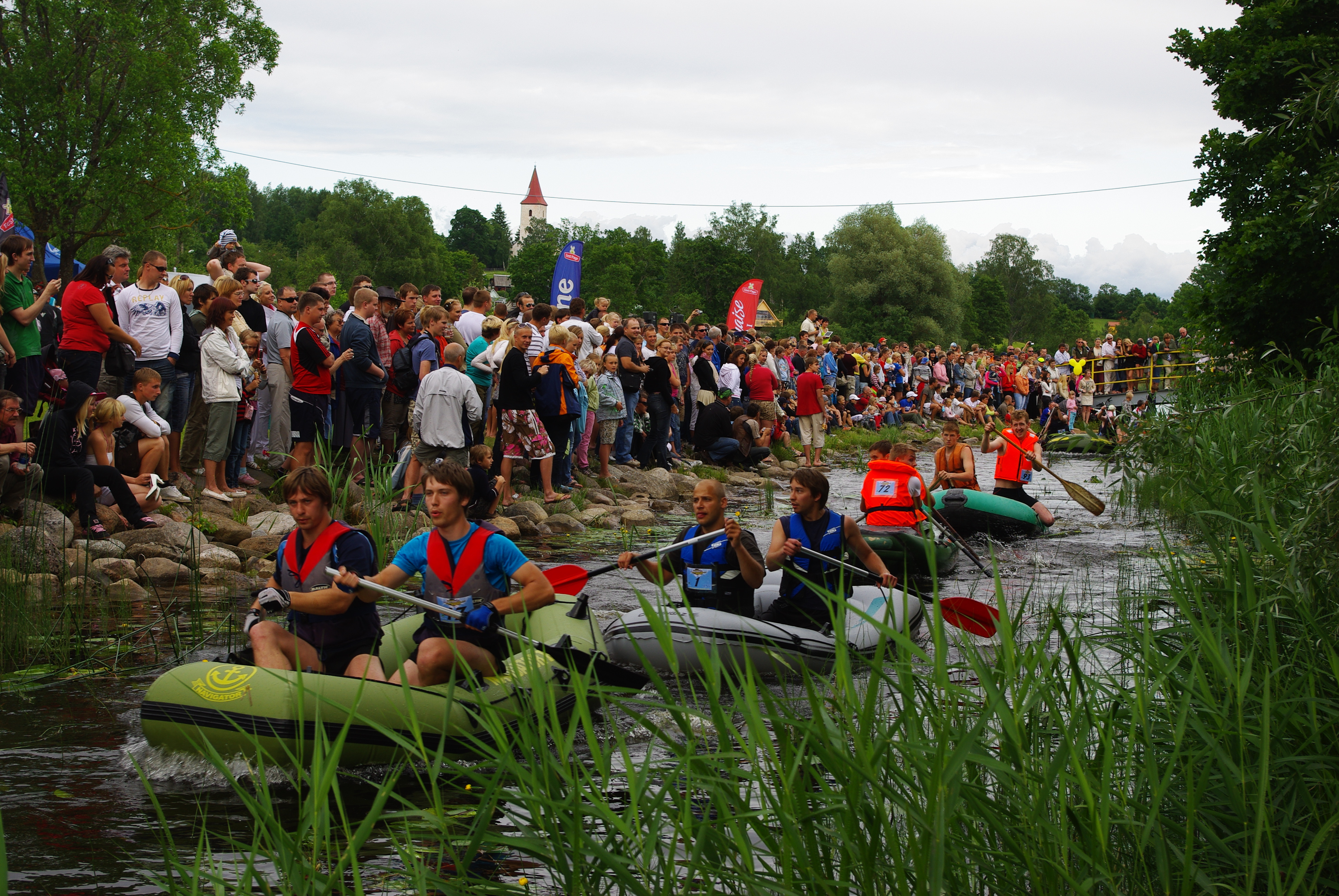
Boat rally

== Notable people ==
Notable people that were born or lived in Rõuge include the following:

- Kadi Taniloo (1911–1998), actress, theater director, and journalist
