= List of music festivals in Estonia =

This is an incomplete list of music festivals held yearly in Estonia:

Name	Estonian name	Location	Time	Years	Notes
August Blues Festival	Augustibluus	Haapsalu	August	2004–present	
Estonian Song Festival	Laulupidu	Tallinn Song Festival Grounds, Tallinn	July	1869–present	held every five years
Glasperlenspiel Music Festival	Klaaspärlimäng	Tartu, Tallinn, Pärnu, Jõhvi, Vormsi	June–July	1995–present	
Green Christmas		Rakvere	December	1996–present	
Jazzkaar				1990–present	
Lelle Alternatiiv		Lelle	July	2004–present	
Music of Seven Cities		Ida-Viru County			summer festival in different towns in Ida-Viru County
MustonenFest				1989–present	baroque music festival. Named after Andres Mustonen
Orient, the Festival of Eastern Music					Festival of Eastern Music
Pärnu Opera Days		Pärnu			opera music Organized by Eesti Kontsert
Rabarock		Järvakandi	June	2005–2009, 2011–2012	
Rock Ramp		Viljandi	August		
Suure-Jaani Music Festival	Suure-Jaani Muusikafestival	Suure-Jaani		1998–present	celebrates the musical works of notable Suure-Jaani residents Artur Kapp, Villem Kapp, Eugen Kapp and Mart Saar
Tallinn International Organ Festival		Tallinn		1987–present	organized by Eesti Kontsert
Tallinn Music Week		Tallinn	end of March to beginning of April	2009–present	Annual showcase music festival.
Tallinn Piano Festival		Tallinn		1998–present	Biggest piano festival in Baltic states
Viljandi Folk Festival	Viljandi Pärimusmuusika Festival	Viljandi	end of July	1993–present	
Viru Folk		Käsmu	August	2008–present	

== See also ==
- List of festivals in Estonia
