= Eru, Estonia =

Village in Estonia

Eru
- Village
- Location in Estonia
- Coordinates: 59°33′56″N 25°50′32″E
- Country: Estonia
- County: Lääne-Viru County
- Municipality: Haljala Parish

Population (2006)
  - Total: 28

Eru is a village in Haljala Parish, Lääne-Viru County, in northern Estonia, on the territory of Lahemaa National Park. Eru has a population of 28 (as of 2006).

== Geography ==
Eru is located on the southeastern coast of Eru Bay (part of the Gulf of Finland), just west of Võsu and southwest of Käsmu and the Käsmu Peninsula. The southern half of Lake Käsmu is located in the village's territory. The village's territory is also bordered by Käsmu Bay to the northeast.

== Notable people ==
Notable people that were born or lived in Eru include the following:

- Jaan Kruusvall (1940–2012), writer, born in Eru
- Edgar Savisaar (1950–2022), prime minister of Estonia (1991–1992), lived at the Hundisilma farm in Eru
