= Aivar Mäe =

Estonian conductor and musician

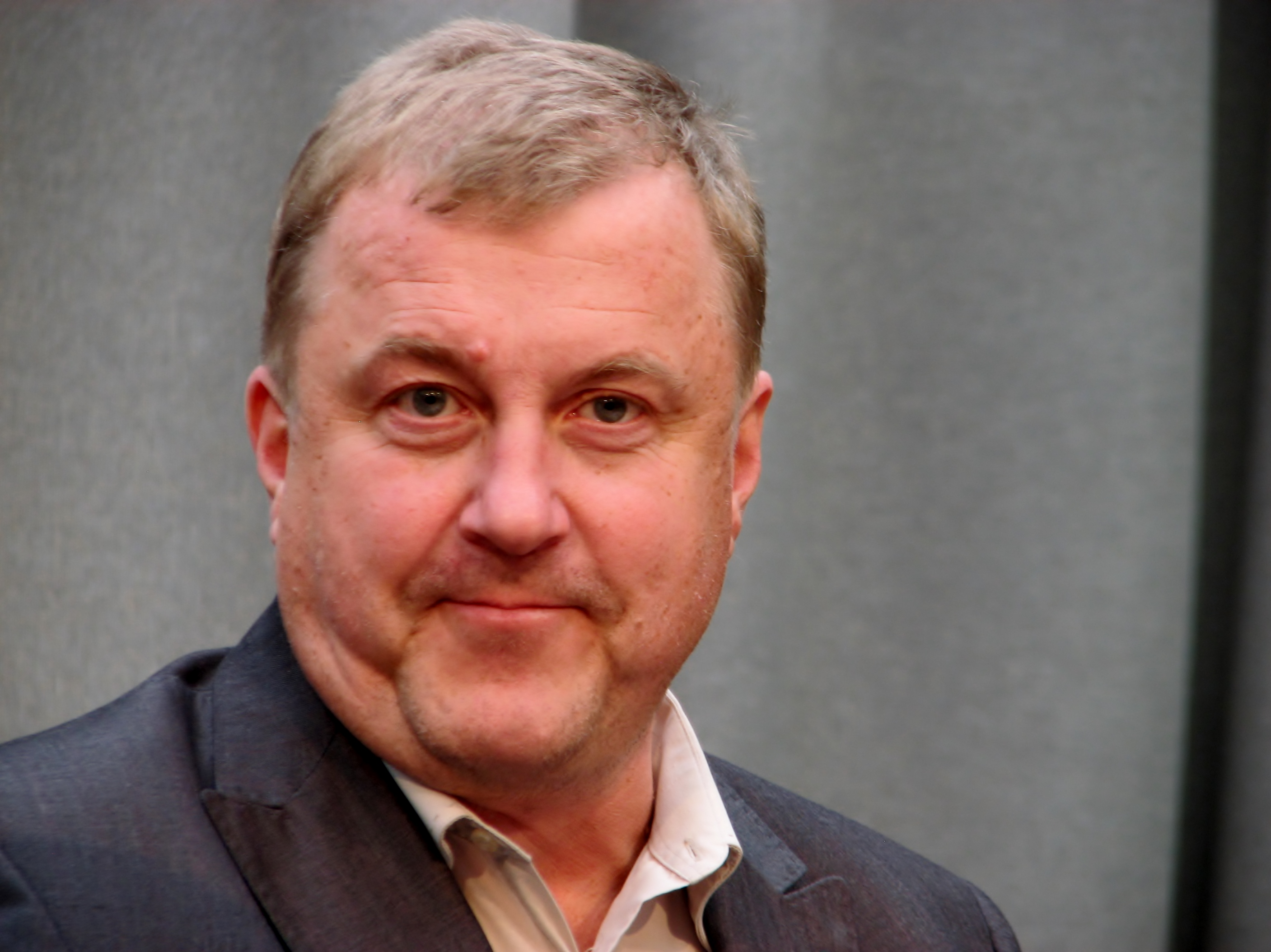
Aivar Mäe

Aivar Mäe (born 12 May 1960 in Pärnu) is an Estonian conductor and musician.

== Biography ==
In 1985 he graduated from Tallinn State Conservatory in music pedagogics.

From 1984 until 1987 he was a vocalist and acoustic guitarist for the pop group Vitamiin.

From 1999 until 2008, he was the executive director of Eesti Kontsert. From 2003 until 2006, he was the director of the Vanemuine theatre. In 2009, he became the executive director of Estonian National Opera, but resigned in August 2021 amidst claims of sexual harassment. Mäe denied the allegations, but later issued a public apology. After his resignation, he took a position at the Artium Cultural Centre in Viimsi.

He is one of the initiators for Saaremaa Opera Days (since 1999) and Jõhvi Ballet Festival (since 2006).

He founded the chamber choir Arsis (active in 1990-1997).

Awards:

- 2003: Order of the White Star, V class.
