= Hortus Musicus =

Estonian musical group

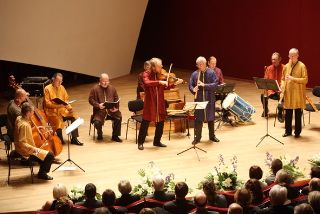
Hortus Musicus in Luxembourg, 2008

Hortus Musicus is an Estonian ensemble that was established in 1972 by Andres Mustonen, a violin student of the Tallinn State Conservatory. Hortus Musicus specialises in performing early music, including 8th–15th-century European forms such as Gregorian Chant, Organum, Medieval Liturgic Hymns and Motets, the Franco-Flemish School, and Renaissance Music (including French chansons, villanelles and Italian madrigals). The group also presents early, non-European styles including Indian Ragas, Israeli temple songs, Arabian mughams and Jewish music. The group's repertoire has also included pieces by 20th-century composers (often created specially for Hortus Musicus, e.g. by Arvo Pärt).

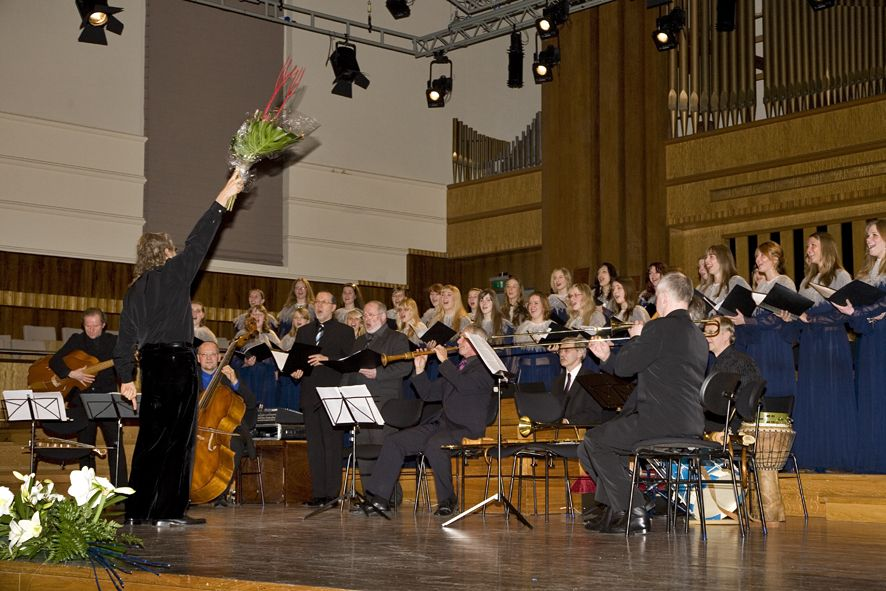
Joint concert of Hortus Musicus and Ellerhein choir in Brussels, 2008

Hortus Musicus has given concerts in the US, Turkey, Japan, and Israel, and has performed at several major early music festivals. They have recorded c 35 programmes, a portion of which is available from companies such as Erdenklang, Musica Svecia, Forte and Finlandia Records. The group's latest recording is "Ave..." (2005): 'music from the late Middle Ages in memoriam Helle Mustonen (1950–2005)'.

== Members ==
- Andres Mustonen – leader, violin, viola, recorder, cromorn
- Olev Ainomäe – shawm, oboe, recorder, schalmey, cromorn, rauschpfeiff
- Valter Jürgenson – sackbut
- Tõnis Kuurme – curtal, shawm, baroque bassoon, recorder, cromorn, rauschpfeiff
- Anto Õnnis – tenor, percussion
- Imre Eenma – violone, viola da gamba
- Ivo Sillamaa – harpsichord, organ, piano
- Tõnis Kaumann – baritone, percussion
- Riho Ridbeck – bass, percussion
- Taavo Remmel – double bass

== Essential discography ==
=== Vinyl Recordings released on "Melodiya" label (USSR) ===
- 1975 — Gregorian chant / Early polyphony (Thousand years of music, vol.1) (Melodiya, S10-06499-00)
- 1975 — "Ludus Danielis" (Thousand years of music, vol.2) (Melodiya, S10 07015-16)
- 1977 — Italian secular music of the 14th c. (Melodiya, S10 07933-34)
- 1977 — Francesco Landini: Ballate, madrigali, caccia (Melodiya, S10 07935-36)
- 1979 — French secular music of the 16th c. (Melodiya, S10 14027-28)
- 1979 — Secular music of the 12th - 14th cc. LP1: France (Melodiya, S10-15085-86)
- 1979 — Secular music of the 12th - 14th cc. LP2: Italy (Melodiya, S10-15087-88)
- 1982 — Italian music of the 16th and 17th cc. (Melodiya, S10 19277-78)
- 1983 — From Yugoslavian manuscripts of the 10th - 12th cc. (Melodiya, S10 19383-84)
- 1984 — French music of the 16th and 17th cc. (Melodiya, S10 20873-74) (LP)
- 1985 — Adriano Banchieri: "La Pazzia Senile", madrigal comedy of 1607. (Melodiya, S10 21697-98)
- 1986 — Suite from The Louvain Collection Of Dances (Melodiya, S10 24423-24)
- 1986 — Guillaume Dufay / Gilles Binchois (Melodiya, S10 24851-52)
- 1987 — Croatian music of the 11th - 14th cc. (Melodiya, S10 25089-90)
- 1988 — German Early Baroque Dance Music (Melodiya, S10 28029-30)
- 1988 — Italian dances of the 14th c. / Liturgical drama "Tractus stellae" (Melodiya, S10 28697-98)

=== Compact Discs ===
==== Compilations, reissues ====
- 1989 — 1200-1600 Medieval - Renaissance (CD1: instrumental music, CD2: vocal music) (Erdenklang 40692)
- 1994 — Gregorianische Choräle -Plainchants- (Erdenklang 40712)

==== Original early music recordings ====
- 1989 — Musik över Östersjön/Music across the Baltic (Musica Sveciae MSCD 302)
- 1991 — Vasakungarnas hov (The Royal Court of the Vasa Kings) (Musica Sveciae MSCD 202)
- 1994 — Johann Valentin Meder: Matthäus Passion 1700 (Hortus Musicus, vol. 1) (Forte Classical FD 0006/2)
- 1995 — Vuestros Amores, He Señora (Erdenklang 50792)
- 1996 — Ave... (Erdenklang 61142)
- 1997 — Maypole (Erdenklang 70982)
- 2005 — Ave... (Estonian Record Productions 805)
- 2018 — Jerusalem (Estonian Record Productions 10318)
- 2018 — canto:) (Estonian Record Productions 10518)
- 2020 — Messe de... Carmina Burana (Estonian Record Productions 11720)

==== Recordings of modern (Estonian) composers ====
- 1995 — Peeter Vähi: 2000 Years After the Birth of Christ (with Kaia Urb, The "Bad" Orchestra etc.) (Antes Edition Classics BM-CD 31.9059)
- 1995 — Peeter Vähi: 2000 Years After the Birth of Christ (with Kaia Urb, The "Bad" Orchestra etc.) (Forte FD 0016/2)
- 1997 — Peeter Vähi: To His Highness Salvador D. (with Ivo Sillamaa, Camerata Tallinn etc.) (Antes Edition Classics BM CD 31.9086)
- 1998 — René Eespere: Concerto Ritornello, Flute Concerto, Viola Concerto (with Ülo Kaadu, Maano Männi, Neeme Punder, Jouko Mansnerus) (Antes Edition Classics BM-CD 31.9129)
- 2003 — Eesti heliloojad/Estonian Composers (III): works by Galina Grigorjeva and Lepo Sumera (ER - Eesti Raadio ERCD 045)
- 2011 — Early Music of 3rd Millennium: Alexander Knaifel, Erkki-Sven Tüür, Peeter Vähi, Arvo Pärt, Valentin Silvestrov, Giya Kancheli. (Estonian Record Productions 4611)
- 2020 — Peeter Vähi / Ludwig van Beethoven: Hommage à brilliance de Lune (Estonian Record Productions 11920)
