= Viru Folk =

Music festival

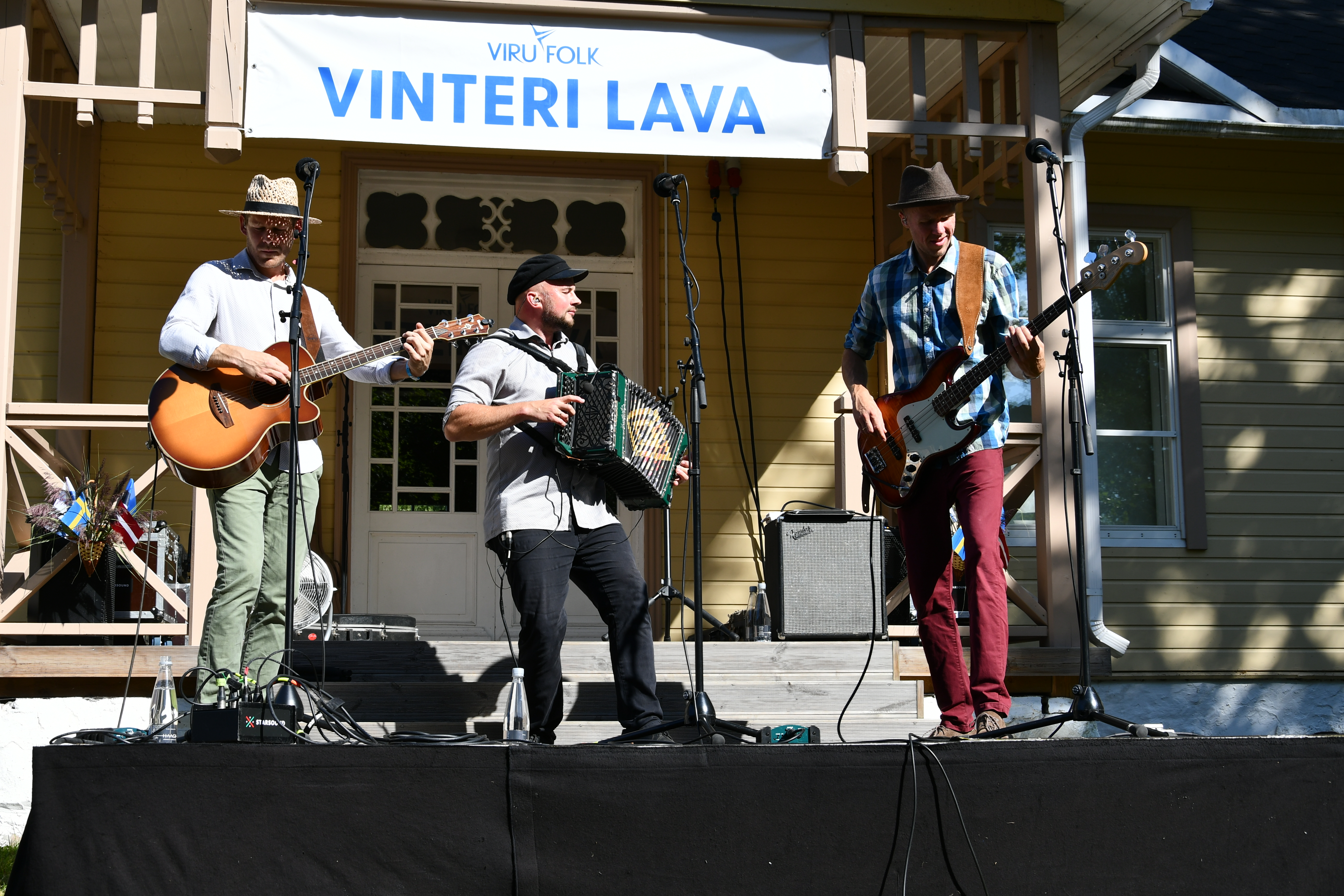
- Genre: Folk music
- Dates: August
- Locations: Käsmu, Estonia
- Years active: 2008-present
- Founders: Peep Veedla
- Website: www.virufolk.ee

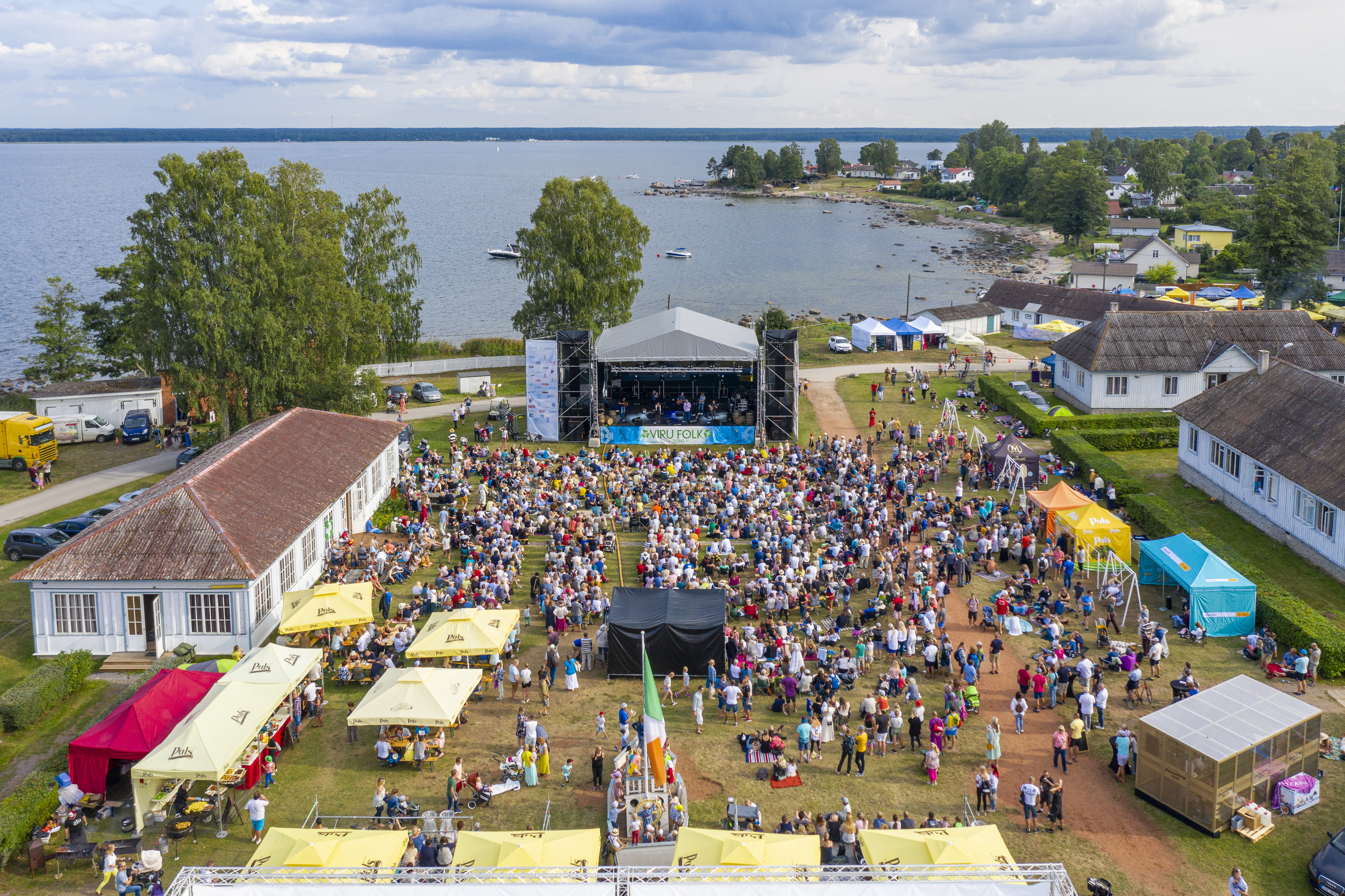
Festival Viru folk in Käsmu (2019)

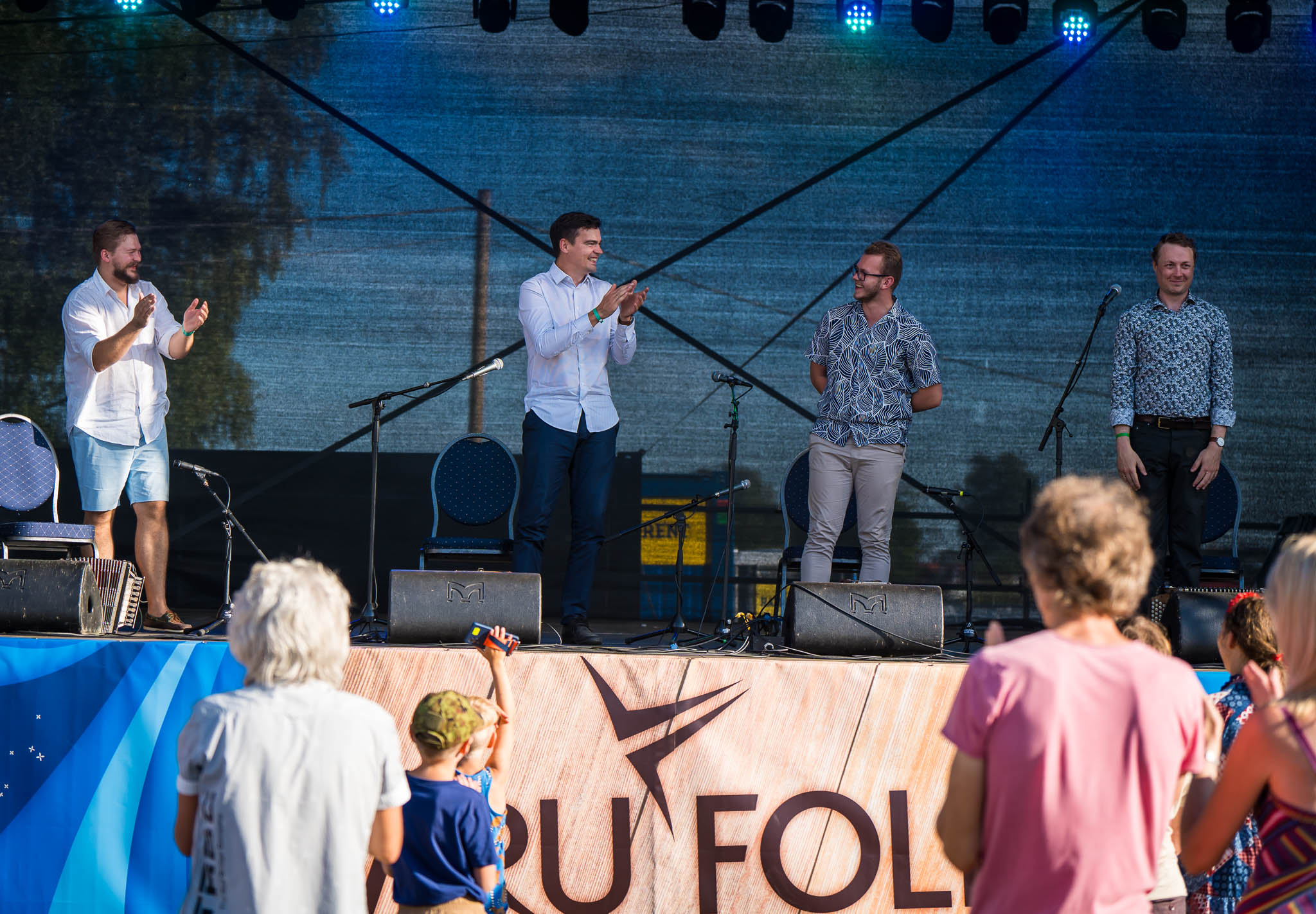
Viru Folk (2023)

Viru Folk is an Estonian music festival held in August in Käsmu since 2008.

It is organised by the nonprofit organization (MTÜ) Viru Folk, and Peep Veedla is the main organiser of the festival. Since 2013, Viru Folk has focused on the music and culture of one region per festival.

Between the years 2010–2020, the amount of festival visitors have varied from 4,000 (in 2020, due to Corona) to 12,000. According to the study, 63% of the visitors were aged between 21–50 and 66% of the visitors were women.

Viru Folk has been awarded the European Festivals Association's EFFE Label twice (2015 and 2017).

== Theme-years of Viru Folk ==
- 2013 Year of Sweden
- 2014 Year of Sami
- 2015 Year of Denmark
- 2016 Year of the Nordic Islands
- 2017 Year of Finland
- 2018 Year of Estonia
- 2019 Year of Ireland
- 2020 Year of Norway
- 2021 Slavic year
- 2022 Year of friendly neighbours
- 2023 Year of British Isles
- 2024 Year of the Alps
- 2025 Year of North America

== See also ==
- List of music festivals in Estonia
