= Lake Käsmu =

Lake in Estonia

- Käsmu järv (Estonian)
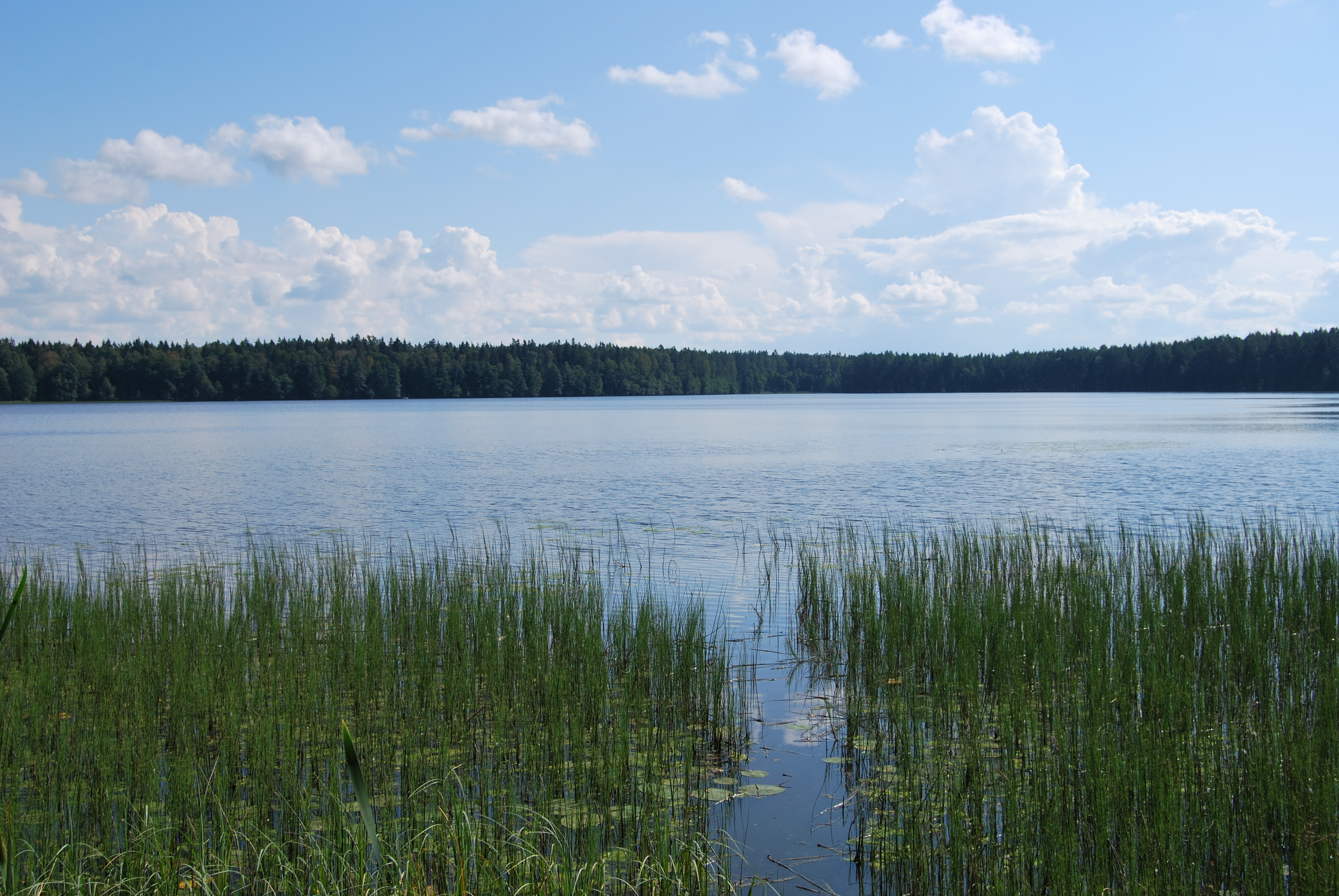

- Location within Estonia
- Location: Eru, Lääne-Viru County, Estonia
- Coordinates: 59°35′N 25°53′E
- Basin countries: Estonia
- Max. length: 1,120 meters (3,670 ft)
- Max. width: 560 meters (1,840 ft)
- Surface area: 48.5 hectares (120 acres)
- Average depth: 1.9 meters (6 ft 3 in)
- Max. depth: 3.0 meters (9.8 ft)
- Water volume: 769,000 cubic meters (27,200,000 cu ft)
- Surface elevation: 3.9 meters (13 ft)

Lake Käsmu (Estonian: Käsmu järv) is a lake in Estonia. It is located in the villages of Eru and Käsmu in Haljala Parish, Lääne-Viru County. Lake Käsmu is located on the southern edge of the Käsmu Peninsula in northern Estonia.

== Physical description ==
The lake has an area of 48.5 hectares (120 acres). The lake has an average depth of 1.9 meters (6 ft 3 in) and a maximum depth of 3.0 meters (9.8 ft). It is 1,120 meters (3,670 ft) long, and its shoreline measures 3,020 meters (9,910 ft). It has a volume of 769,000 cubic meters (27,200,000 cu ft). It has diverse vegetation in terms of the number of species: there are 22 types of macrophytes.

== See also ==
- List of lakes of Estonia
