= Peeter Vähi =

Estonian composer

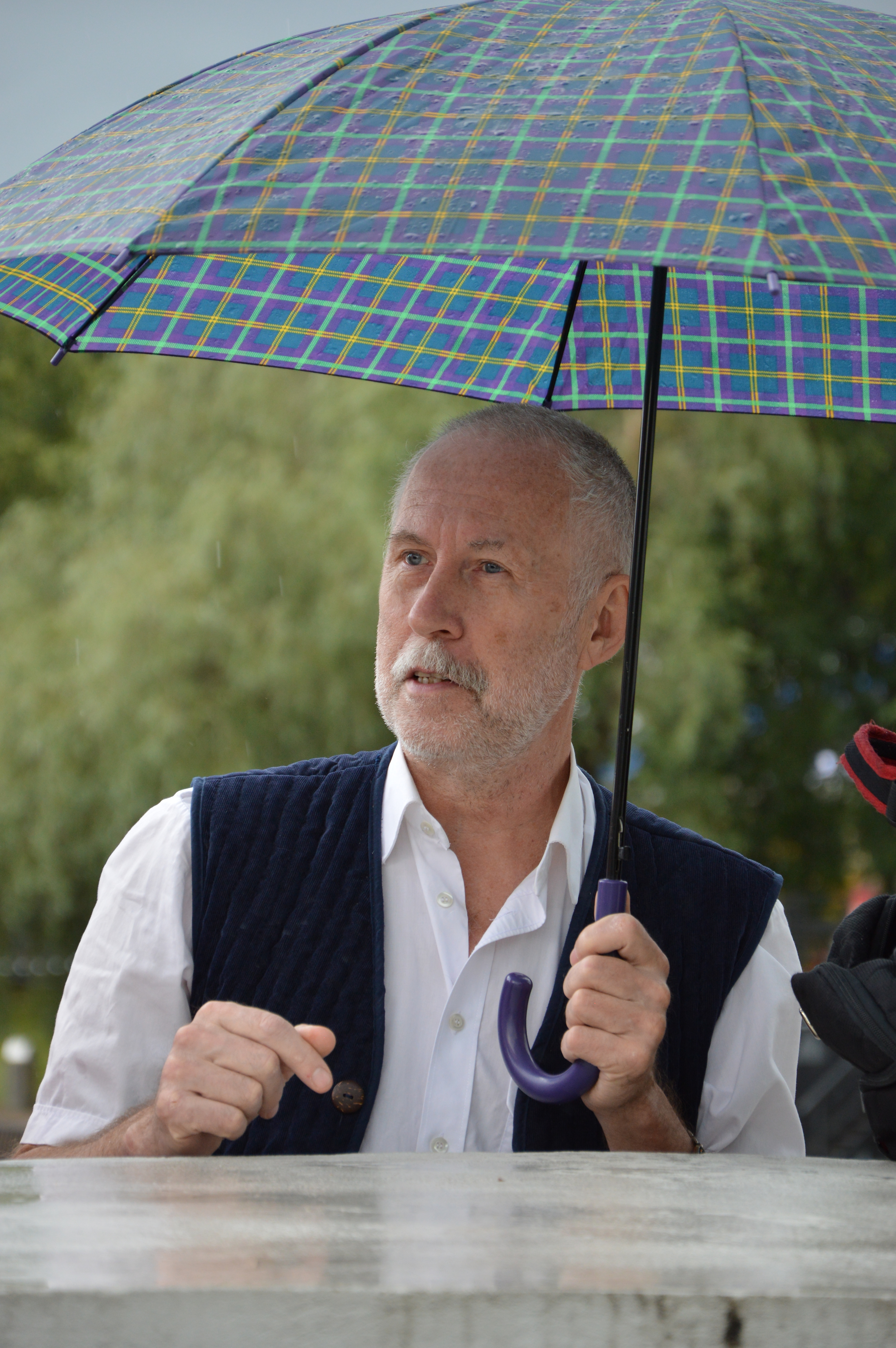
Peeter Vähi in 2019

Peeter Vähi (born 18 May 1955, Tartu) is a classical Estonian composer. Vähi's work Relaxatio, written in 1992 and inspired by Asian intonal elements of Tibetan canticles, is a noted electronic work of psychotherapeutic music.

== Discography ==
- Music for Synthesizers (1989) Melodiya (vinyl LP), Works: "Reverence", "Evening Music", "Concerto grosso", "Gates", performed by: Mati Kärmas, Ivo Sillamaa, Andrus Vaht, Peeter Vähi, C60 28297 004
- The Path to the Heart of Asia (1992) Erdenklang (CD), (based on oriental folk music), 20602
- 2000 Years After the Birth of Christ (1995) Forte (CD), performed by: Kaia Urb, Works: "Hortus Musicus", "The Bad Orchestra", FD 0016/2
- 2000 Years After the Birth of Christ (1995) Antes Edition Classics (CD), performed by: Kaia Urb, Works: "Hortus Musicus", "The Bad Orchestra", BM-CD 31.9059
- Sounds of the Silver Moon (1996) Forte (CD), Co-authorship: Abhay Phagre, Krishna Kumar Kapoor, FD 0038/2
- To His Highness Salvador D (1997) Antes Edition Classics (CD), Works: "To His Highness Salvador D", "Mystical Uniting", "Digital Love", "Concerto Piccolo", "Four Engravings of Reval", Performed by: Hortus Musicus, Camerata Tallinn, 1997 Antes Edition Classics BM CD 31.9086
- Supreme Silence (1998) CCn’C (CD), Work: "Supreme Silence", performed by: Irén Lovász, Estonian National Male Choir RAM, English Handbell Ensemble Arsis, Konchok Lundrup and Kristjan Järvi
- Handbell Symphony (1997) Antes Edition Classics (CD), Work: "Handbell Symphony", Performed by: English Handbell Ensemble Arsis and Estonian National Symphony Orchestra,
- A Chant of Bamboo (2006) (vinyl LP), Works: "A Chant Of Bamboo", "The White Concerto", "Forty-two", "Mystical Uniting", performed by: Tallinn Chamber Orchestra, Slava Grigoryan, Neeme Punder, Nils Rõõmussaar, Andres Uibo, Risto Joost. Live in Estonia Concert Hall, March 16, 2006, ERP 1006
- Chrysanthemum Garden (2007) CCn’C Records (Germany) (non-physical release), Works: "Chrysanthemum Garden Chant", "Green Tārā, performed by: Tokyo Philharmonic Chorus, Matsubara Chifuru (Japan), Fujisaki Shigeyasu (shinobue-flute, Japan), Girl's Choir Ellerhein, Tiia-Ester Loitme, Sevara Nazarkhan (vocal, Uzbekistan), musicians of Estonian National Opera,
- Maria Magdalena (2012) Estonian Records Productions (Super Audio CD), Work: "Mary Magdalene Gospel", performed by: Peeter Volkonski, Sevara Nazarkhan, Priit Volmer, Mixed Choir Latvija, Riga Dom Cathedral Boys Choir, Latvian National Symphony Orchestra, Risto Joost, ERP 5412
- In the Mystical Land of Kaydara (2017) Estonian Records Productions (DVD), Work: "In the Mystical Land of Kaydara", an African initiation rite, performed by: Tanel Padar, Mati Turi, Rauno Elp, Priit Volmer, Girls' Choir Ellerhein, Estonian National Male Choir, Estonian National Symphony Orchestra, Mihhail Gerts, video director Jüri Tallinn, 2017 / SSI ERP 8816
- Hommage a Brilliance De Lune (2020) Estonian Record Productions Works: "Hommage a Brilliance De Lune (single CD), Beethoven-Vähi, performed by: Hortus Musicus, ERP 11920
- Tamula Fire Collage (double CD), Works: "Saatus / Fate", "The Flutish Kingdom, Being and Nothingness in Kostabi's Atelier", "2000 Years After The Birth Of Christ", performed and/or co-composed by: Neeme Punder, Siiri Sisask, Kirile Loo, "Hortus Musicus"
