= Tractus stellae =

Medieval liturgical drama

Tractus Stellae
- Original language: Latin
- Subject: Journey of the three magi to Bethlehem
- Genre: Liturgical drama
- Setting: Epiphany matins

Premiere
- Date: 11th century (Zagreb manuscript MR 165)

Tractus Stellae (The Path of the Star) is a medieval liturgical drama written in Latin with musical notation, about the journey of the three Magi to Bethlehem.

It is one of two liturgical dramas included in an 11th-century manuscript from the library of Zagreb Cathedral (manuscript codex MR 165), the other being Visitatio Sepulchri. Collectively the two works are known as Agenda Pontificalis Hartwick Arduini episcopi Jauriensis, in reference to Bishop Hartvik, who is usually connected to the city of Győr, with the book transferring from there to Zagreb around 1094. The drama also appears in different forms in later medieval manuscripts, including a 13th-century manuscript from Rouen (MS Paris, BN lat. 904), known as Officium Stellae, and in another originally held in Malmédy. This lends to the theory that the Benedictine monks at Pannonhalma Archabbey in Hungary were the original writers of the play, in view of their close links to the church in those places.

The drama was intended to be performed at the matins service on Epiphany, the feast day that celebrates the visit of the Magi to the Christ Child.

The drama begins with a processional song, Procedentem sponsum, and continues with a dialogue between the Magi and King Herod, who sends them to search for the newborn king. In the second scene, the star guides the magi to Bethlehem where they greet baby Jesus and offer him gifts. The piece ends with an ornate Te Deum and an O Regem caelis as the antiphon. The play was designed to take place in three parts of the church: at the altar, in front of an icon of the Virgin Mary, and at Herod's throne, placed in the centre of the church. The play's stage directions are detailed.

== Contemporary recordings ==
Music recordings of the drama include a plainchant version by the Hungarian Schola Hungarica (Hungaroton, 1985) and a longer version with instrumentation by the Estonian ensemble Hortus Musicus (Melodiya, 1989).
