= Jaan Kruusvall =

Estonian writer and playwright

Jaan Kruusvall (full name Jaan-Vahur Kruusvall; 7 December 1940 Eru, Palmse Parish, Virumaa – 3 April 2012) was an Estonian writer and playwright.

From 1966 to 1971, he studied at Maxim Gorky Literature Institute in Moscow. From 1964 to 1966 and from 1974 to 1976, he worked as an administrator and documentary film editor at Tallinnfilm.

== Selected works ==
- 1979: play "Endine Wunderkind" ('Former Wunderkind')
- 1980: short story "Lõhn ('The Scent')
- 1992: short story "Rännakul" ('On a Journey')
- 1983: play "Pilvede värvid" ('Colours of the Clouds')
- 1987: longer prose "Sügisdivertisment" ('Autumn Divertissement')
