= Andres Mustonen =

Estonian conductor and violinist

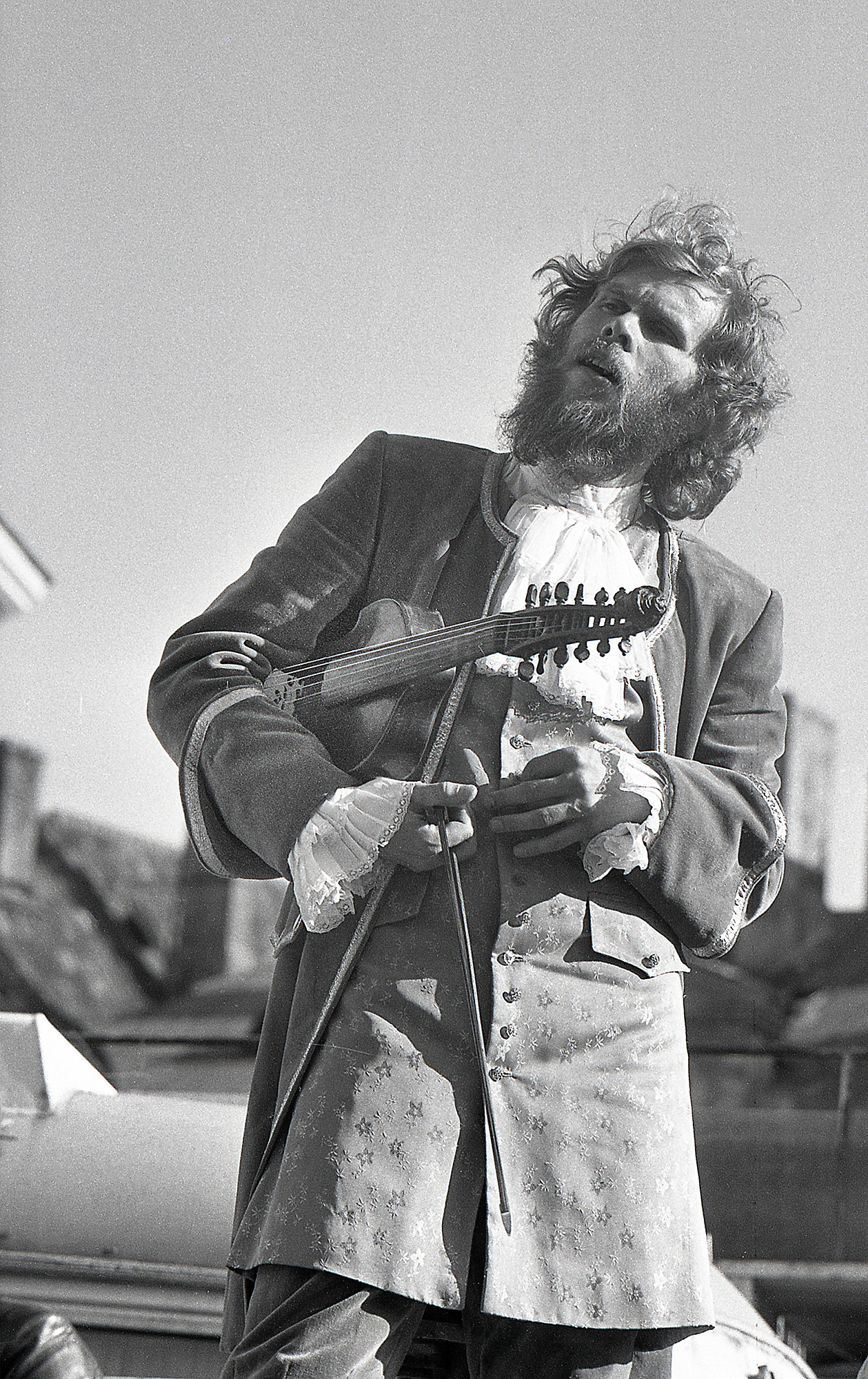
Andres Mustonen, 1984 (image by Jaan Künnap)

Andres Mustonen (born 1 September 1953) is an Estonian conductor and violinist.

== Biography ==
Mustonen was born in Tallinn on 1 September 1953. He graduated from the Tallinn Music High School in 1972 and five years later both he and Endel Lippus graduated from the Tallinn State Conservatory. Later on, he studied in Austria and the Netherlands and then became a music specialist in his native Estonia and overseas. When he became a conductor he played in such orchestras as Riga's chamber orchestra Sinfonietta Riga and Moscow-based Tchaikovsky Symphony Orchestra, Philharmonic Orchestra and Russian National Orchestra.

He also was a conductor for the Saint Petersburg Philharmonic Orchestra and was in cooperation with Lithuanian and Latvian Philharmonic Orchestras. In Estonia he conducted with the Estonian National Symphony Orchestra and Tallinn Chamber Orchestra along with Vanemuine Symphony Orchestra. Outside of the Soviet Union he participated in the Finnish Radio Symphony Orchestra and many choirs in Germany, Sweden and the Netherlands.

He is well known for performing works of such composers as Johann Sebastian Bach, Wolfgang Amadeus Mozart, Anton Bruckner, Manuel Cardoso, Dmitri Shostakovich, Georg Philipp Telemann and Heinrich Schütz. Besides playing classical music of foreign composers, he played such Soviet composers as Gia Kancheli, Sofia Gubaidulina and Valentyn Sylvestrov among others. He also worked in collaboration with such violinists as Sergei Stadler, Viktor Tretiakov and Oleg Kagan from Russia, Danish Michala Petri and French Patrick Gallois and Michel Lethiec among others.

In 1972 he became a founder of Hortus Musicus and worked with the ensemble as a director and conductor ever since. His ensemble performed in such festivals as the Bratislava Music Festival in Slovakia, Israeli Jaffa Festival and Tallinn-Tel Aviv Festival in Tel Aviv, and Lufthansa Baroque Festival in London among other well-known festivals. Besides being a founder of Hortus Musicus he is also a founder of Hortus Music Academic Orchestra which recorded many albums for Warner Classics, Melodiya and many other labels. Somewhere in 2003 he participated in the Viljandi Folk Music Festival and the same year was honoured by the Estonian Music Council with a prize. In 1998 he received the Order of the White Star. Currently he gives concerts with such musicians as Tanel Ruben, Taavo Remmel, Jaak Sooäär and many others.

In 2014 he established the "Mustonenfest Tallinn Tel Aviv Festival" - an annual event, in which classical collectives from Estonia perform in Israel. He is the artistic director of the festival.
