= Käsmu =

Village in Estonia

- Village
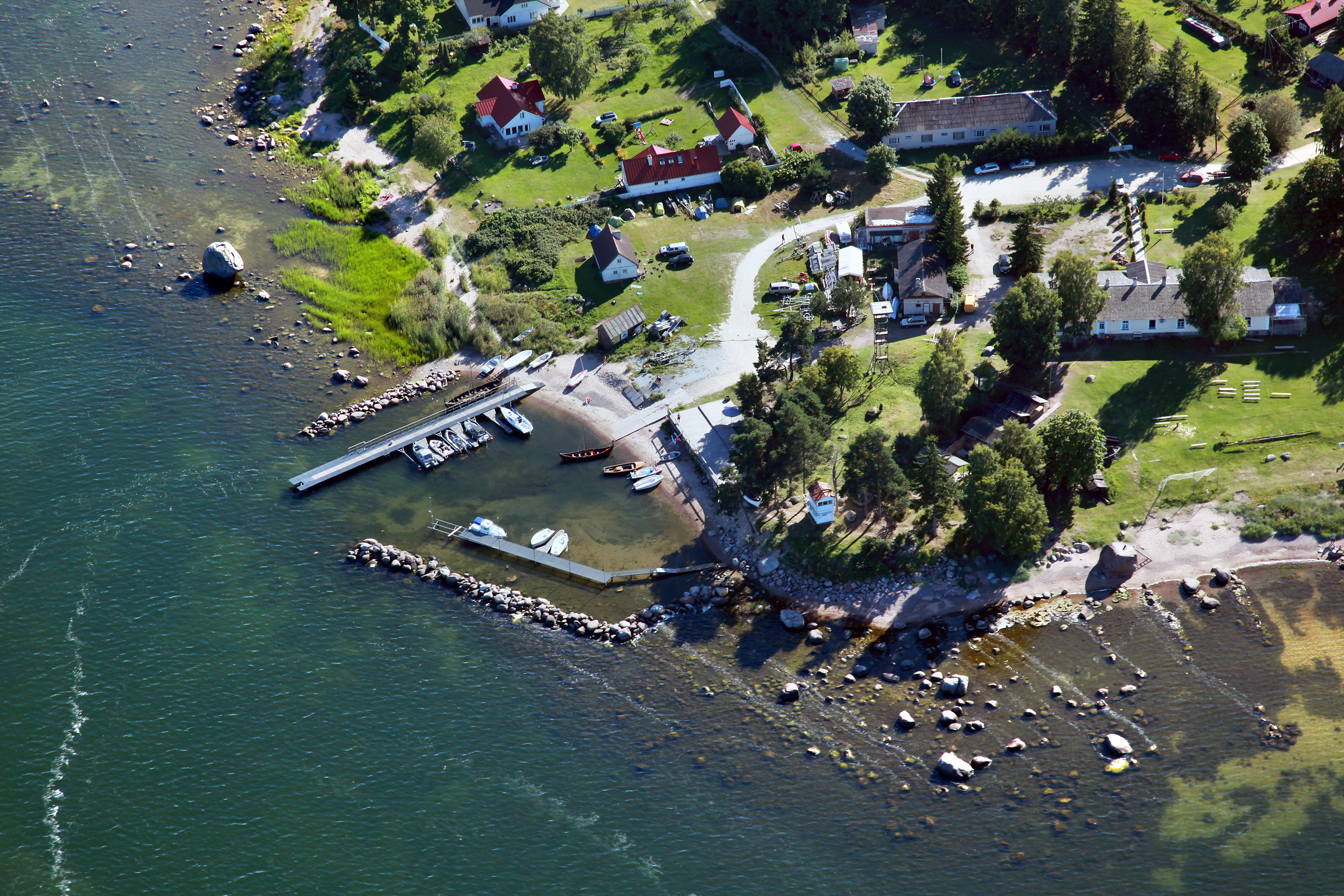
- Käsmu Harbour

- Location in Estonia
- Coordinates: 59°36′11″N 25°55′10″E
- Country: Estonia
- County: Lääne-Viru County
- Municipality: Haljala Parish
- First mentioned: 1453

Population
  - Total: 131

Käsmu (German: Kaspervik, Hasterwieck) is a village in Haljala Parish, Lääne-Viru County, in northern Estonia, on the territory of Lahemaa National Park. It is located northwest of Võsu, on the Käsmu Peninsula in the Gulf of Finland, bordered by Eru Bay to the west and Käsmu Bay to the east.

Käsmu was first mentioned in 1453 as Kesemo, a beach belonging to Aaspere Manor. Käsmu was recorded as a village in 1524. Due to its location, food was mostly acquired from the sea. The main fish included Baltic herring and flounder.

In 1697, the first ship in Käsmu was built for the baron of Palmse Manor. During the second half of the 19th century, large sailing ships started being built in Käsmu. In 1891 a lighthouse was built. Käsmu Harbour became one of the main sites for wintering in the region. Between 1884 and 1931, a maritime school operated in Käsmu.

Summering in Käsmu started in 1840, after the owner of Aaspere Manor, General Nikolai von Dellingshausen, built his family summer manor there. Since then, many intellectuals and artists have stayed in Käsmu. Notable persons include Edmund Russow, Anastasia Tsvetaeva, Peter Ustinov, Romulus Tiitus, Igor Vsevolovski (buried in Käsmu), Nikolai Rakov, Ülo Vinter (buried in Käsmu), Arvo Pärt, and Gustav Ernesaks.

The Käsmu Sea Museum was established in the former cordon building in 1993. The main sights in Käsmu also include the Dellingshausen Chapel (the General's Chapel) and a wooden church with a churchyard.

Since 2008, a folk music festival (Viru Folk) has been held annually in Käsmu.

== Gallery ==
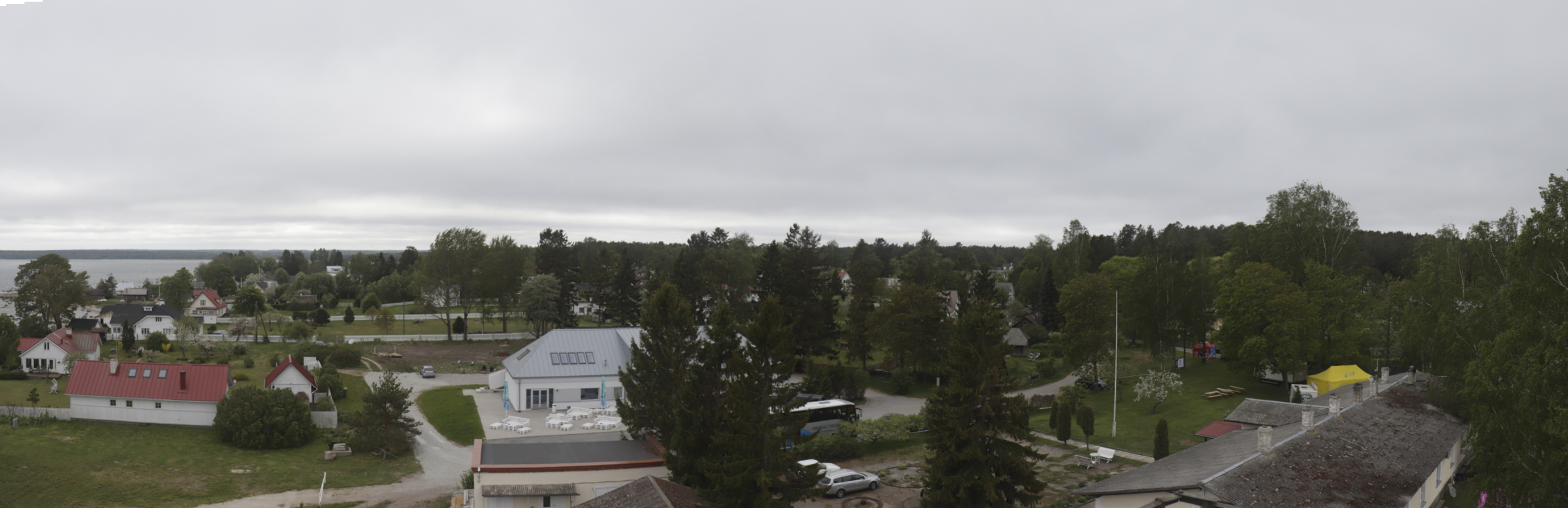
Village panorama

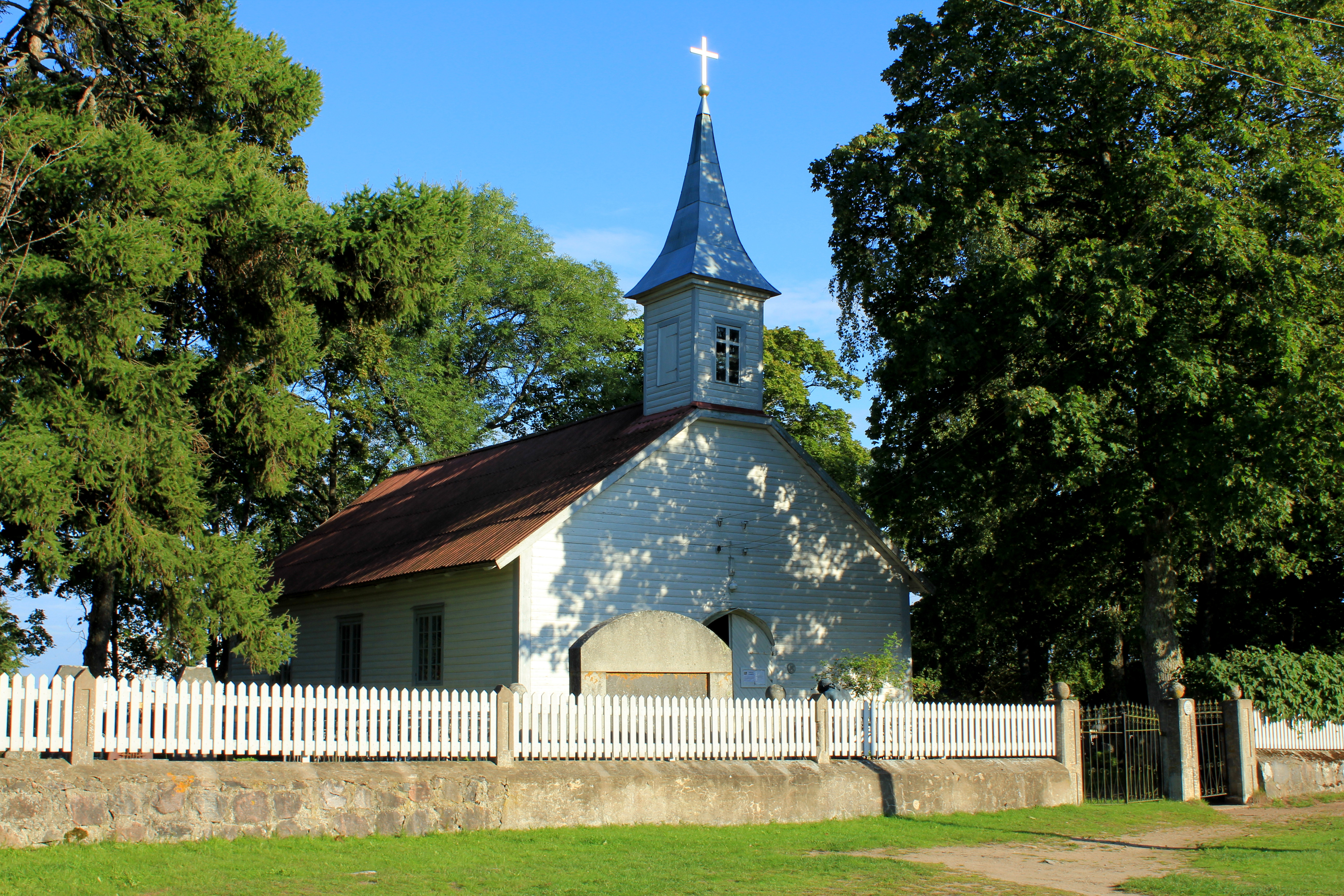
Käsmu Church

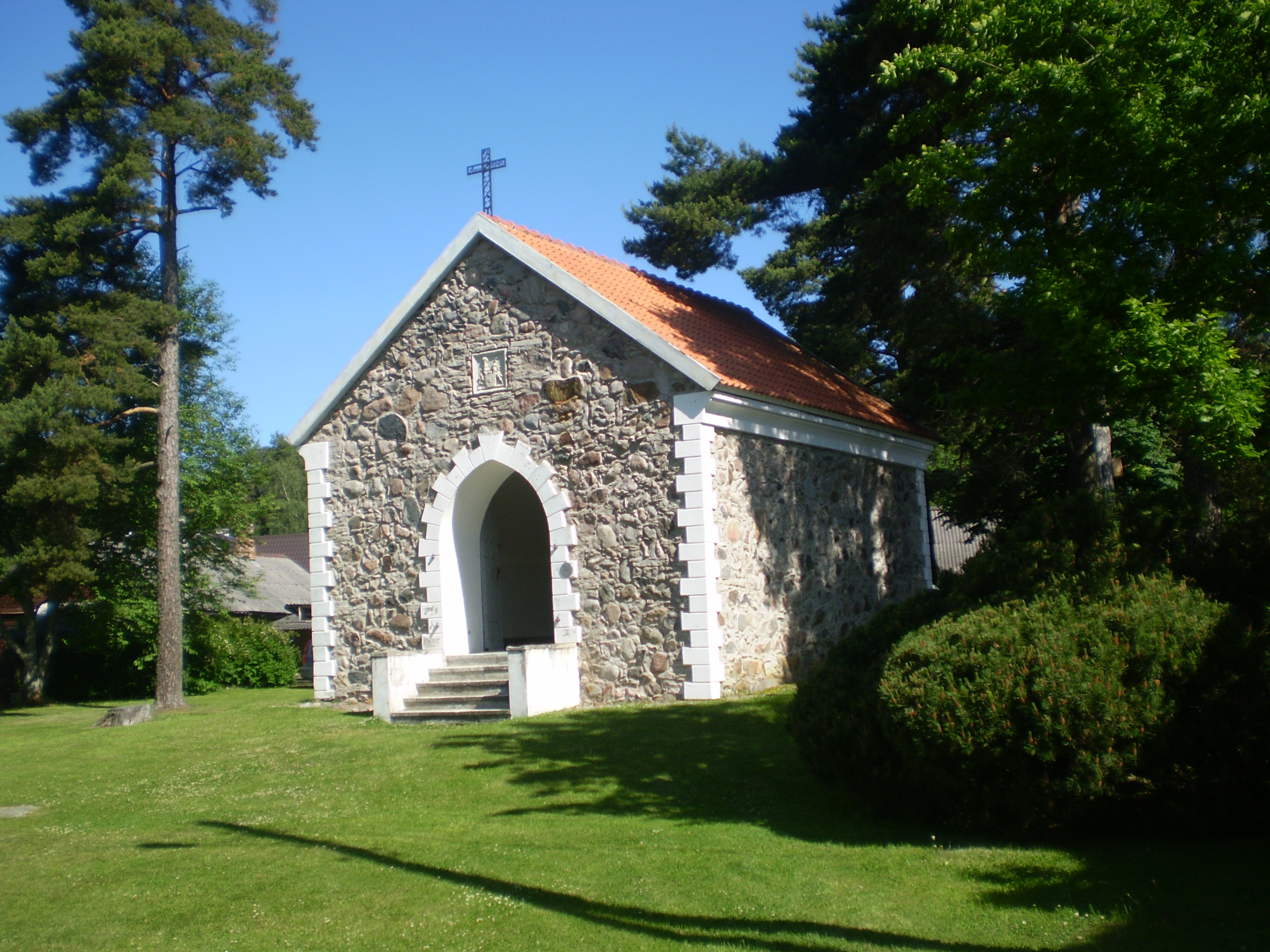
The Dellinghausen Chapel

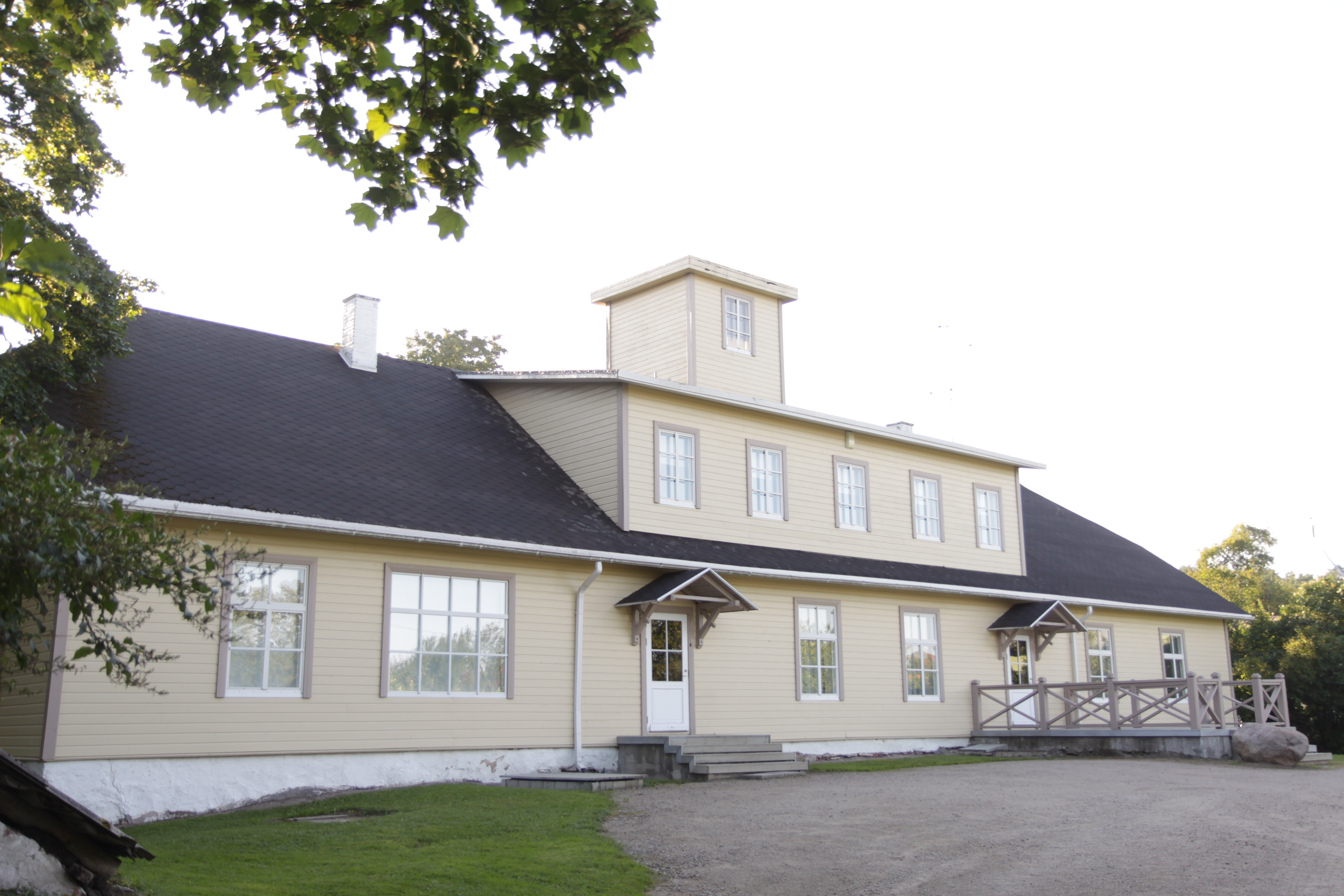
The former Käsmu Maritime School

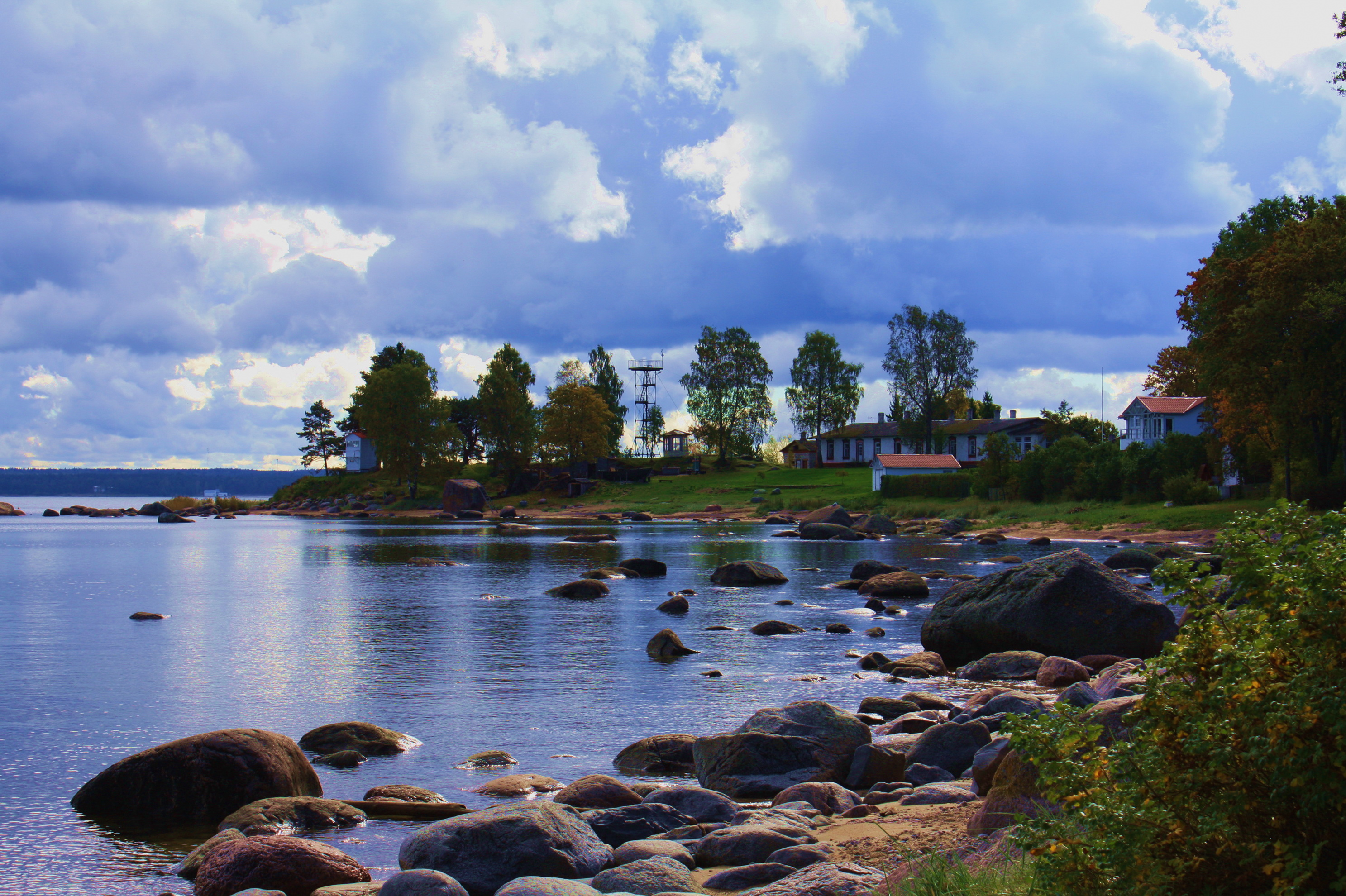
The Käsmu Maritime Museum on the coast of Käsmu Harbour

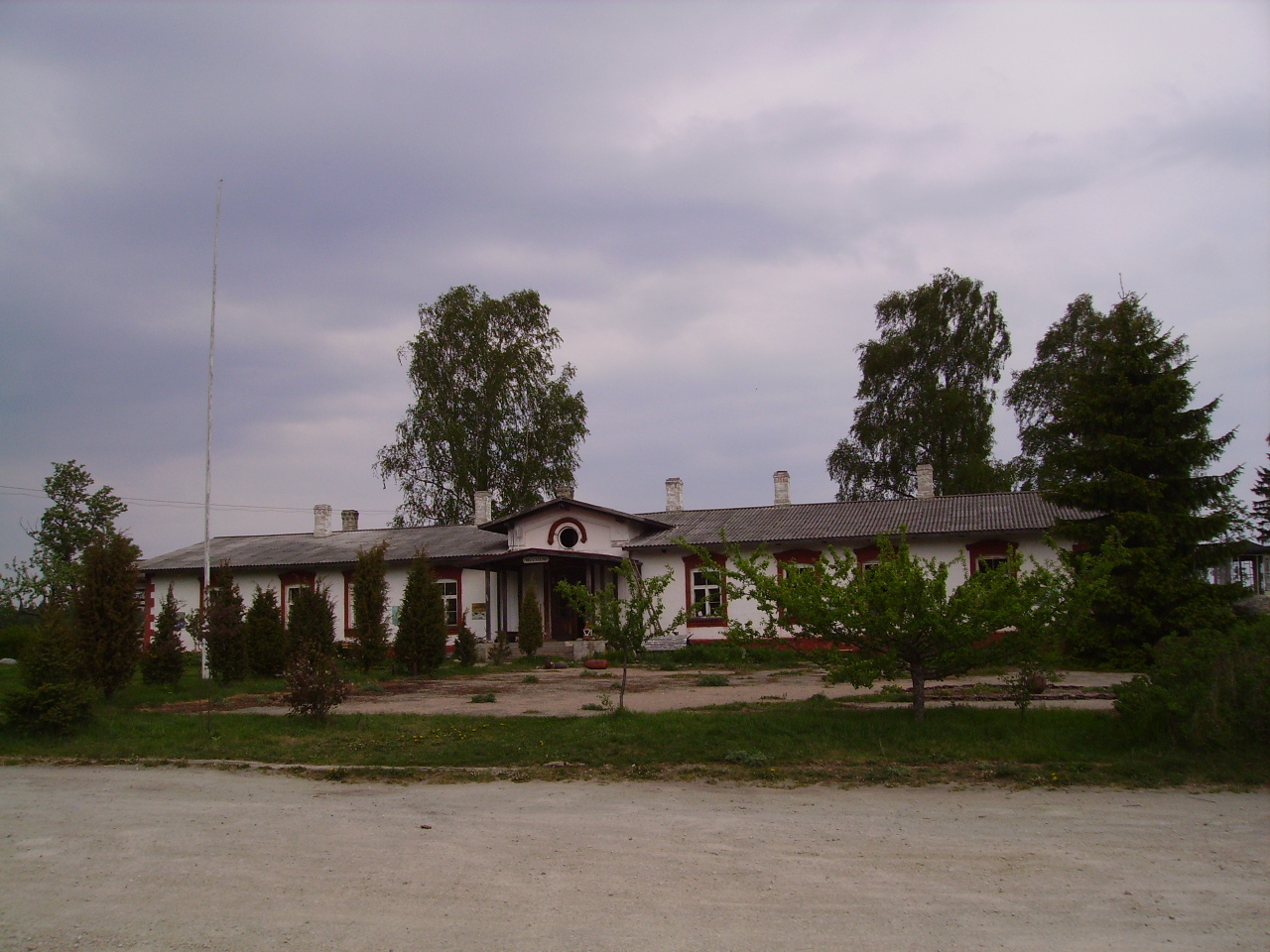
The Käsmu Maritime Museum

== See also ==
- Lake Käsmu
