= Saaremaa Opera Festival =

Music festival held in Estonia

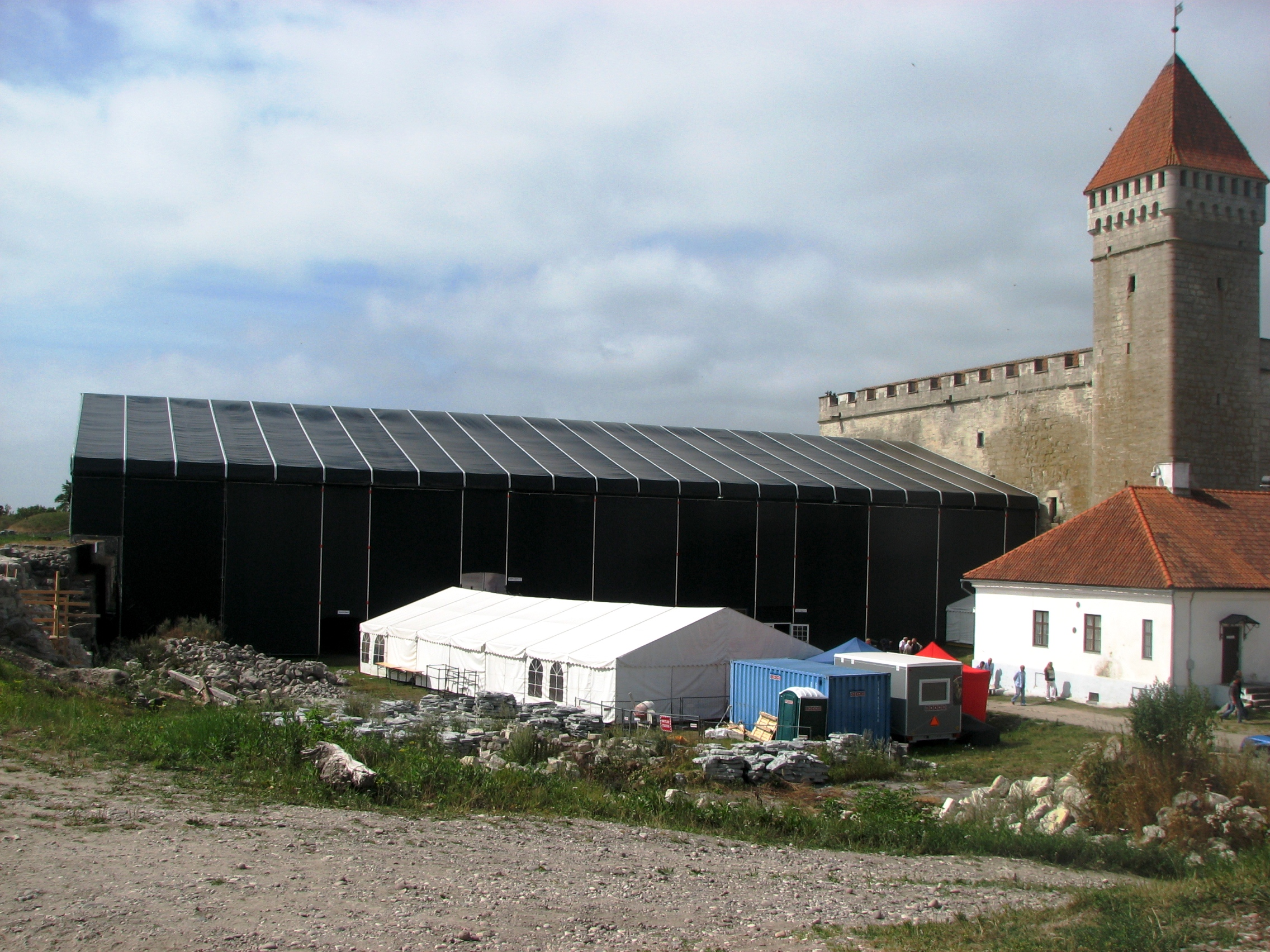
Opera house (black)

Saaremaa Opera Festival (Estonian: Saaremaa ooperipäevad) is an international music festival which focuses on opera music. The festival takes place in Kuressaare, Saaremaa, Estonia. This festival is the oldest music festival in Estonia focused on opera music. Since 2008, the festival has been organised by Eesti Kontsert.

First festival took place in 1999.

For the festival, a special opera house was built.
