= Glasperlenspiel Music Festival =

Music festival held in Estonia

The annual Glasperlenspiel Music Festival (Glass Bead Game Festival, in Estonian Klaaspärlimäng) is a joint project of Eesti Kontsert and Estonian Record Productions since 1995. It is a leading musical event in the Estonian summer.

Peeter Vähi, a composer and music producer, is the artistic director of the festival.

The Glasperlenspiel Festival is inspired by Hermann Hesse's novel The Glass Bead Game, and its content is intended to present music from unusual angles, occasionally tied to a literary, religious, philosophical, esthetical or some other theme. Recent offerings include Nietzsche contra Wagner, Mozart & Salieri, Jungle Book of Baroque, Carmina Burana Speciale, Da Vinci Code, End of the Era of Composers, Music for Glass Harmonica, and Freemasonic Music.

The European Union Baroque Orchestra, the Schleswig-Holstein Festival Orchestra, the Australian Chamber Orchestra, the Chamber Orchestra of the Royal Opera House Covent Garden, the Tokyo Philharmonic Chorus, Absolute Ensemble, Kremerata Baltica, Roy Goodman, Christoph Eschenbach, Yan Pascal Tortelier, Vadim Repin, Piotr Anderszewski, Gidon Kremer, Olli Mustonen, as well as most leading Estonian musicians (the Estonian National Symphony Orchestra, the Estonian National Opera, the Tallinn Chamber Orchestra, the Estonian National Male Choir RAM, the Estonian Philharmonic Chamber Choir, the Early Music Consort "Hortus Musicus", NYYD Ensemble, Eri Klas, Järvi "dynasty", Olari Elts, Tõnu Kaljuste) have performed at Glasperlenspiel.
