= Eesti Kontsert =

Estonian music organization

Eesti Kontsert is an Estonian institution, which main activity is to organize music concerts and music festivals in Estonia and abroad. Annually, over 1000 concerts/festivals are organized by Eesti Kontsert.

The institution was established in 1941. Until 1989 it used the name Estonian SSR State Philharmonic (Estonian: Eesti NSV Riiklik Filharmoonia).

== Concerts/Festivals ==
Notable concerts/festivals:

- Tallinn Piano Festival
- Saaremaa Opera Festival
- Tallinn International Organ Festival
- Pärnu Opera Days
- Music of Seven Cities
- MustonenFest.
