= Estonian Record Productions =

Music production company based in Estonia

- Company type: Music production house
- Founded: 1 March 2001
- Headquarters: Estonia
- Key people: Peeter Vähi, artistic director Tiina Jokinen, managing director
- Services: Record production, artists management, festivals, conferences, TV documentaries
- Website: ERP website

Estonian Record Productions ("ERP") is an Estonian music production company, founded on 1 March 2001. The main activity was initially record production, and the company has now branched out to produce music festivals and concerts, act as artist management, publish music, and offers notation and specialised travel services for musicians. Peeter Vähi is the artistic director and Tiina Jokinen is the managing director.

== Music festivals ==
ERP arranges two regular music festivals: an Eastern music festival, Orient and, in co-operation with the city of Tartu, the Glasperlenspiel festival. Though the home base for both festivals is Estonia, during recent years a number of concerts have taken place in Latvia, Finland, Sweden and St. Petersburg.

Orient is the first and so far only festival in the Baltic countries that is solely dedicated to Asian music, the main focus being on folk and sacred as well as traditional classical music. The festival has featured the most prominent Oriental musicians like the Indian flautist Hari Prasad Chaurasia, sitarists Ravi and Anoushka Shankar, the Japanese giant drums ensemble Kodô, the Tuvinian guttural singers "Huun-Huur-Tu", Tibetan Buddhists monks of the Gyuto and Gyudmed monasteries, the Turkish percussionist Burhan Öçal, the Armenian dudukist Jivan Gasparyan, the Azeri muqam singer Alim Qasimov.

The annual Glasperlenspiel Festival is inspired by Hermann Hesse's novel, and its intention is to look upon and present music from unusual angles, occasionally tied to a literary, religious, philosophical, esthetical or some other new angle. Recent themes have included Nietzsche contra Wagner, Mozart & Salieri, Da Vinci Code, Jungle Book of Baroque, Carmina Burana Speciale, End of the Era of Composers, Music for Glass Harmonica, and Freemasonic Music. The Australian Chamber Orchestra, the Covent Garden Chamber Orchestra, West-Deutsche Rundfunk Symphony Orchestra, Tokyo Philharmonic Choir, Gidon Kremer, Vadim Repin, Christopher Eschenbach and others, as well as Estonian musicians have performed at Glasperlenspiel.

== Artist management ==
ERP represents percussion ensemble Kodo, Kremerata Baltica, guitarist Rémi Boucher, mixed choir Latvija, Glasperlenspiel Sinfonietta, conductors Mikhail Leontyev and Andres Mustonen, Tuvan National Orchestra.

== Recordings ==
Since 2001 ERP releases records under its own label but the minority of production has been for foreign record companies or labels like Warner Classics/Finlandia Records, Erdenklang, CCn’C, DA Music, and others. Though the main activity is still CD and DVD production, 2006 vinyl records are also being produced. Recordings for non-physical release on the internet are offered as well.

== Partial discography ==
- Estonia – 100 – a jubilee collection consisting of 11 CDs, double CDs
- 100 Years of Estonian Symphony
- Arvo Pärt. Vater Unser
- Arvo Pärt. Pilgrim's Song
- Maria Magdalena, oratorio by Peeter Vähi
- In the Mystical Land of Kaydara, oratorio by Peeter Vähi
- Nordic Legends
- Cyrano de Bergerac, opera by Eino Tamberg
- Paavo Järvi conducts EUYO at Glasperlenspiel Festival
- Wallenberg. An Opera by Erkki-Sven Tüür
- A Chant of Bamboo, an LP by the Tallinn Chamber Orchestra
- Perfume: The Story of a Murderer movie sound track
- Great Maestros, CD series
