= Käsmu Bay =

Bay in Estonia

Coordinates: 59°36′N 25°57′E

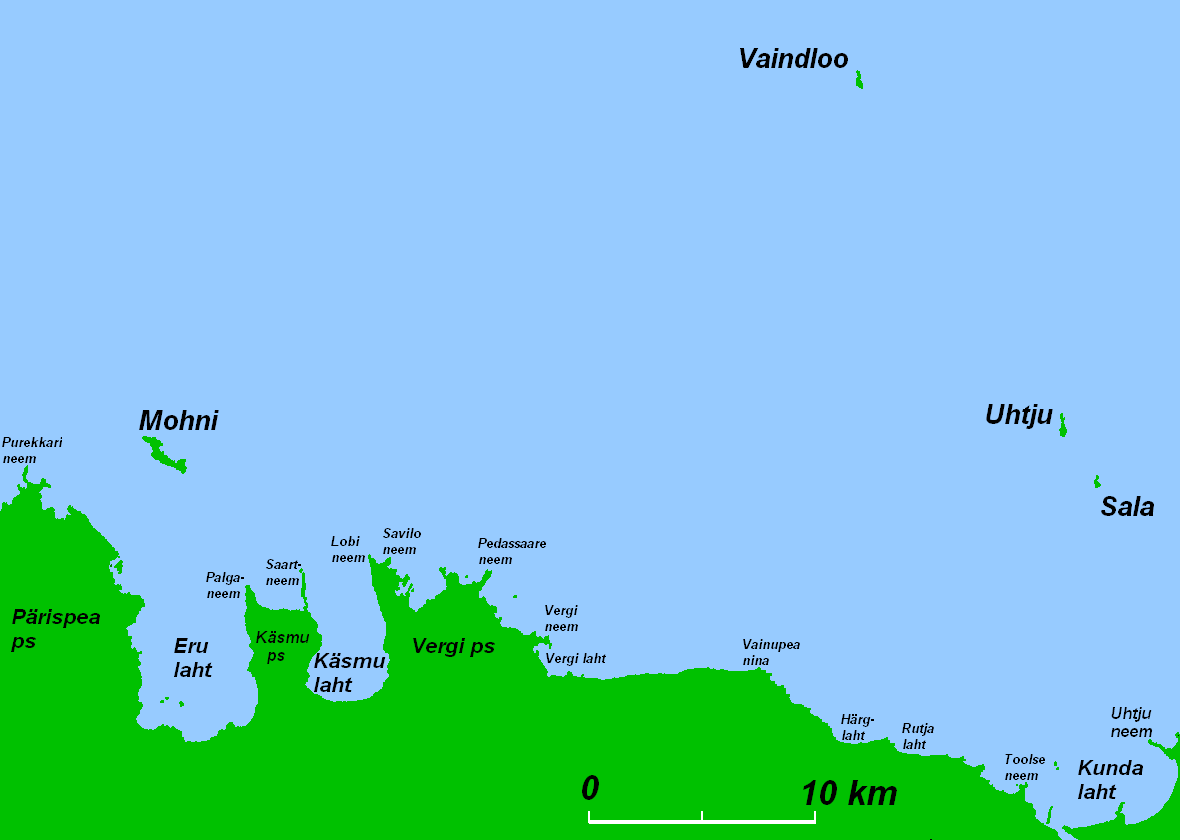
Location of Käsmu Bay

Käsmu Bay (Estonian: Käsmu laht) is a bay in Lääne-Viru County, Estonia.

The bay is located between Käsmu and the Vergi Peninsula. The bay's width is up to 4 km and it has a depth of 12 to 27 m. Käsmu Creek and the Võsu River flow into the bay. The borough of Võsu is located on the bay. The bay is under protection as part of Lahemaa National Park.
